= José Martínez Berasáin =

Spanish Carlist politician (1886–1960)

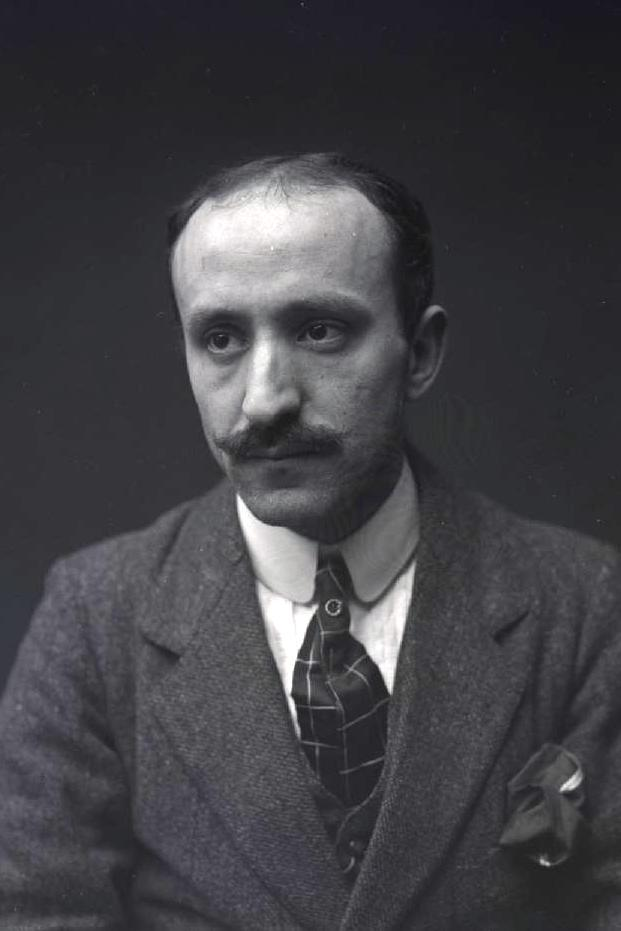
- Born: José Martínez Berasáin; 1886; Pamplona, Spain
- Died: 1960 (aged 73–74); Pamplona, Spain
- Occupation: entrepreneur
- Known for: politician
- Political party: Carlism

Victoriano José Martínez Berasáin (1886–1960) was a Spanish Carlist politician, noted particularly in his native Navarre. He is best known for his role during anti-Republican conspiracy of early 1936 and during the first months of the Civil War, when he headed the regional wartime Carlist executive. In 1937–1938 he was the provincial leader of Falange Española Tradicionalista; in 1939 he served as vice-president of Diputación Foral de Navarra. During two successive terms of 1955–1960 he was holding a seat in the Cortes. He is also acknowledged as an amateur photographer.

== Family and youth ==
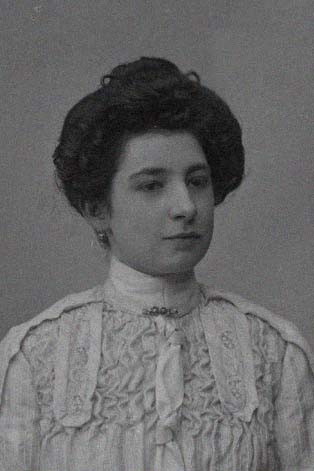
His wife

There is close to nothing known about Martínez’ distant ancestors, except that the family has been for centuries related to Navarre. His paternal grandfather Felipe Martínez volunteered to legitimist troops during the First Carlist War and following defeat he spent 4 years on exile in France. In Besançon he learnt the cooper's craft and having returned to Pamplona he opened his own workshop. He married a local girl, Francisca Larrondo Ollo. Their son Victoriano Martínez Larrondo (1846-1894) was also a carpenter, professionally active at least since the early 1880s; he became well known in the city and grew to "conocido industrial". In 1872 He married Micaela Celedonia Berasáin Marin (1849-1920), daughter to a local Pamplonese merchant of wine preservatives and foodstuffs. It is not clear how many children the couple had; it is known that José had at least two brothers and at least two sisters. Following the premature death of Victoriano the widow took over the business and managed it at least until the early 20th century.

It is not clear whether José received education beyond the obligatory primary level; in particular, none of the sources consulted notes his academic career. He tried his hand in trade; initially he ran a bookstore at Bajada de Javier, but later he turned it into a shop dealing in religious items, including imagery, sculptures, standards, Cassocks and other liturgical vestments. In the 1920s formally listed as casullero, until the 1930s he operated a family company Martínez Berasáin y Cia. Until the mid-1920s he held also an unspecified job at La Agrícola, the local insurance and then banking company. It went bust in 1925, but some time afterwards Martínez found employment in another financial institution, Banco de Bilbao, which opened its Pamplona office in 1926. Some authors claim that in the mid-1930s he was already the manager of the Pamplonese branch, though this role is confirmed in primary sources only for the post-war period.

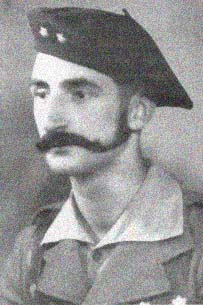
His son, Luis

In 1909 Martínez married a girl from Pamplona, Ramona Erro Cia (1886–1972); she was daughter to Manuel José Erro Ercila, employee of Diputación de Navarra who worked as administrator of self-governmental properties. The couple had 11 children, born between the early 1910s and the late 1920s. None of them became a public figure. Four sons: Luis, Juan Bautista, Alejandro and José Ramón Martínez Erro volunteered to Carlist requeté troops during the civil war. Luis was moderately active within Carlism during the Francoist era and in the 1970s he sided with the progressist faction of Prince Carlos Hugo; José Ramón tried his hand in historiography. Among the grandchildren Luis María Martínez Garate was also an active Huguista militant to become a locally known Basque-Navarrese historian and a Nabarralde ideologue, while Javier Ochoa Martínez is a celebrated bodeguero who developed his own wine brand. Martínez’ nephew was Benito Santesteban Martínez, notorious due to his instrumental role in rearguard repression in Navarre during the early phases of Nationalist rule in the region.

== Early public activity (until 1930) ==
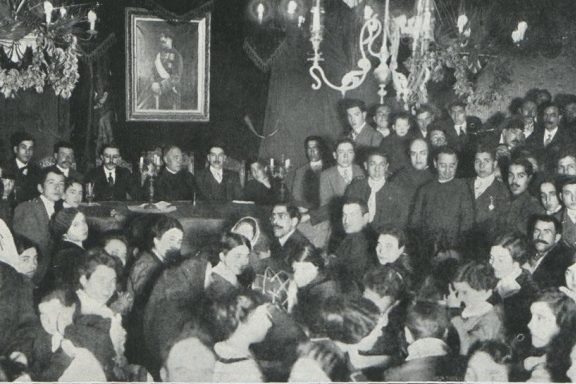
Juventud Jaimista, 1910s

Ascendants of both Martínez and his wife were for generations related to Traditionalism; in legitimist ranks they took part in civil wars and paid for it with exile and deportations, in some cases as far away as Cuba. Martínez Berasáin inherited the Carlist outlook; in his case it contained also a strong Basque and fuerista flavor. During his youth he engaged in Juventud Jaimista and in the mid-1910s he grew to president of the local Pamplona branch of the organization. When in 1919 Carlism faced a profound crisis related to secession of the so-called Mellistas, he did not join the rebels; according to his son total loyalty towards the claimant has been for generations the principal political guideline for all the family members. At the turn of the 1910s and the 1920s he already counted among respected Pamplonese party members. During initial works on vasco-navarrese autonomy he formed part of Comité carlista pro autonomía de Navarra; the body called for full restoration of regional foral rights, abolished in 1839.

The 1923 coup of Primo de Rivera brought political life in Spain to a standstill; parties ceased to operate. There is no information on Martínez’ Carlist activity during the dictatorship. It is known that at least initially he viewed the regime with sympathy and possibly engaged in its local structures; within the family the primoderiverista quasi-party Unión Patriótica was dubbed "Ultima Puñetería", considered the ultimate bulwark against the forthcoming revolution. He focused on cultural activity and tried to enhance Catholic, traditional values by co-operation with Biblioteca Católico-Propagandística. He developed a particular interest in photography; Though most of his high-quality pictures portrayed family members, some served propagandistic purposes and were shared with the local Catholic review La Avalancha. At unspecified time Martínez entered Consejo de Administración of the Carlist Navarrese press mouthpiece, El Pensamiento Navarro.

Carlist standard

In the late 1920s Martínez no longer belonged to the mid-low strata of petty bourgeoisie and formed part of "conservative middle-class, integrated with centers of local establishment". Due to his job in Banco de Bilbao he maintained links with "mundo de los negocios" and "clase media y alta", while thanks to the religious shop keeping fare he stayed in touch with "toda la clerecía navarra". He carefully cultivated the network of business, private and political contacts; it covered all Navarre and was registered in what would later become his famous "libreta", a notebook with names and addresses. Though at the time he was already a solid, very serious personality well above 40, when in 1930 dictatorship was replaced with dictablanda he again emerged as a member of Juventud Jaimista. During the last months of the monarchy in re-established Carlist structures Martínez took a seat in the Pamplona party executive.

== Republic (1931–1936) ==
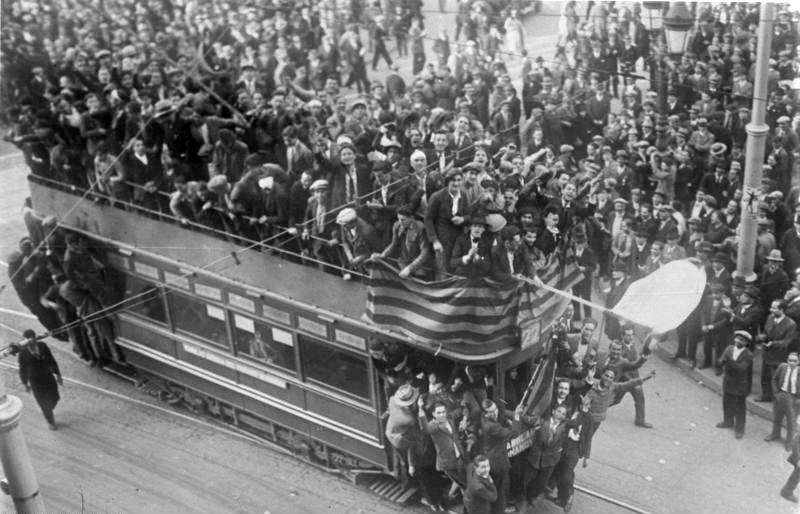
Republic declared, 1931

In the early 1930s Martínez was first noted as jefe of Carlist structures in Pamplona. In 1931 latest he became vice-president of the regional Carlist organization. He also assumed presidency of managing board of El Pensamiento Navarro. He became engaged in key party initiatives in the region. In May 1931, prior to the first Republican electoral campaign, Martínez due to his contacts and links to Basque nationalists was instrumental when forging the PNV-Carlist alliance; it emerged as "candidatura católico-fuerista" and proved largely successful. In 1932 with Víctor Morte, Ignacio Baleztena and Gabriel Aldáz he was delegated to represent Navarre in a Carlist committee set up to agree a common stand on autonomous project, drafted for the vasco-navarrese provinces. As the Pamplonese party leader he chaired local meetings and signed various open letters, e.g. the one protesting alleged anti-religious measures. He was also in presidency of numerous Catholic organizations which confronted the secular governmental course: Asociación Católica de Padres de Familia, Asociación para la Defensa de los Religiosos Vasco Navarros and in Consejo Superior Diocesano de la Adoración Nocturna.

In the mid-1930s Martínez was not particularly active as a party propagandist. Though at times he presided or co-presided over regional Carlist rallies, e.g. during the 1934 gathering in Pamplona or during the 1935 homage to Zumalacárregui in Estella, he seldom appeared as key speaker and in public he remained withdrawn into the second row. However, scholars maintain that at the time Martínez was in fact controlling the Navarrese Carlism; some claim he shared this role with Joaquín Baleztena, others prefer to note an informal managing triumvirate of Martínez-Baleztena-Rodezno. Though he did not rise to Spanish party executive, Martínez is by some historians considered a person who co-ordinated financing of Comunión Tradicionalista nationwide. His key position is attributed to his organization skills and to the wide network of personal contacts, be it among middle-class, establishment or religious structures. In terms of political strategy Martínez represented a traditional and old-fashioned Carlist style; he opposed socially radical current represented by the youth organization AET and its Pamplonese leader, Jaime del Burgo.

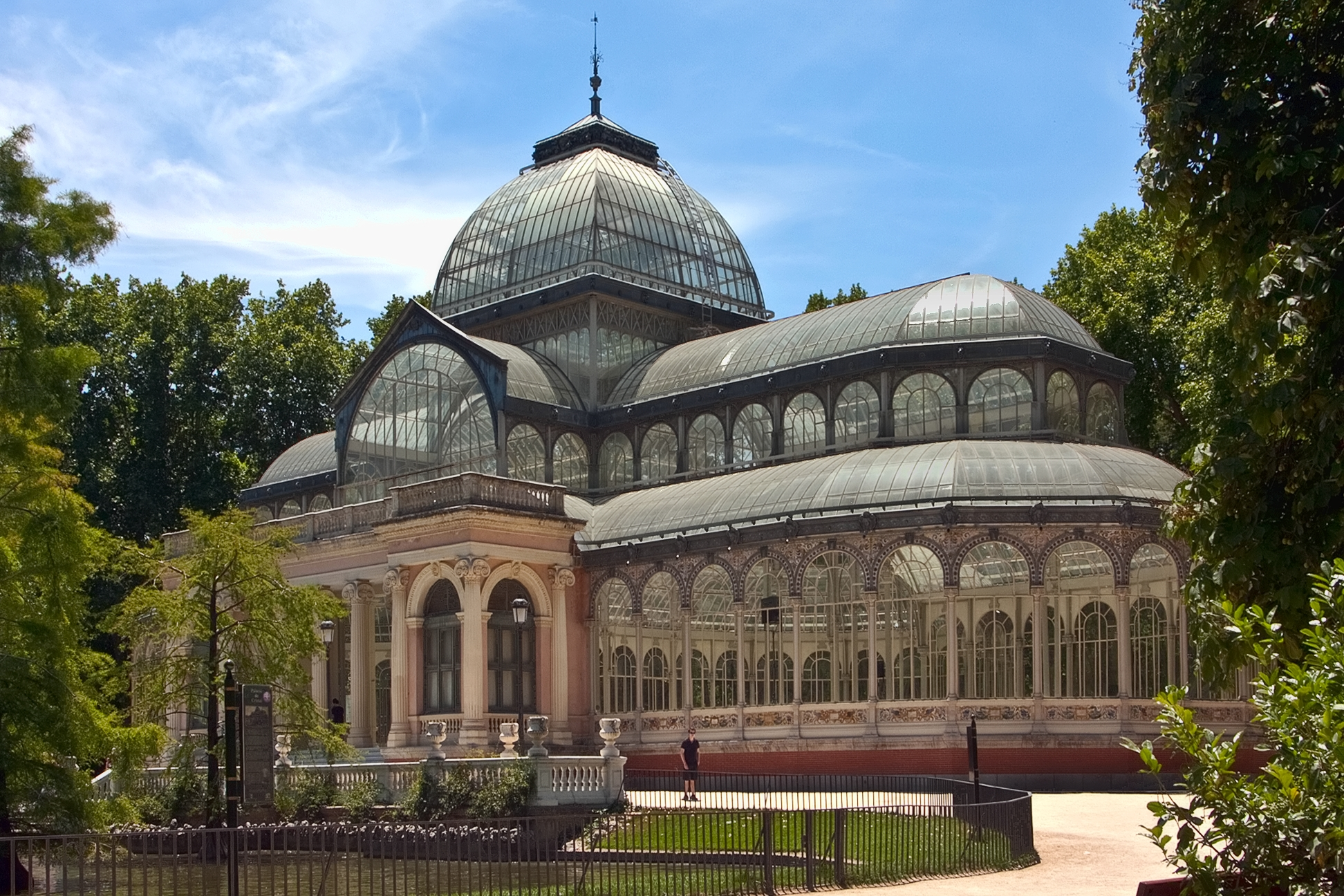
Palacio del Retiro

As a back-row éminence-grise Martínez managed the Navarrese Carlist electoral machinery during the campaigns of 1933 and 1936. However, he did not field his own candidature until April 1936, when following the deposition of president Alcalá-Zamora the elections of compromisarios, supposed to elect a new president, were to be held across the country. The Navarrese Carlists formed a right-wing coalition alliance named Bloque de Derechas; Martínez was its president, but also one of 6 candidates contesting seats allocated to Navarre. This turned out to be the only election he took part in throughout his entire life. The Bloque defeated the counter-candidate list fielded by Frente Popular; with some 66,000 votes Martínez was comfortably elected. In Madrid he was one of only 3 CT compromisarios present during the election session, held in Palacio del Retiro; he probably cast a blank ballot paper.

== Conspiracy and coup d’état (1936) ==
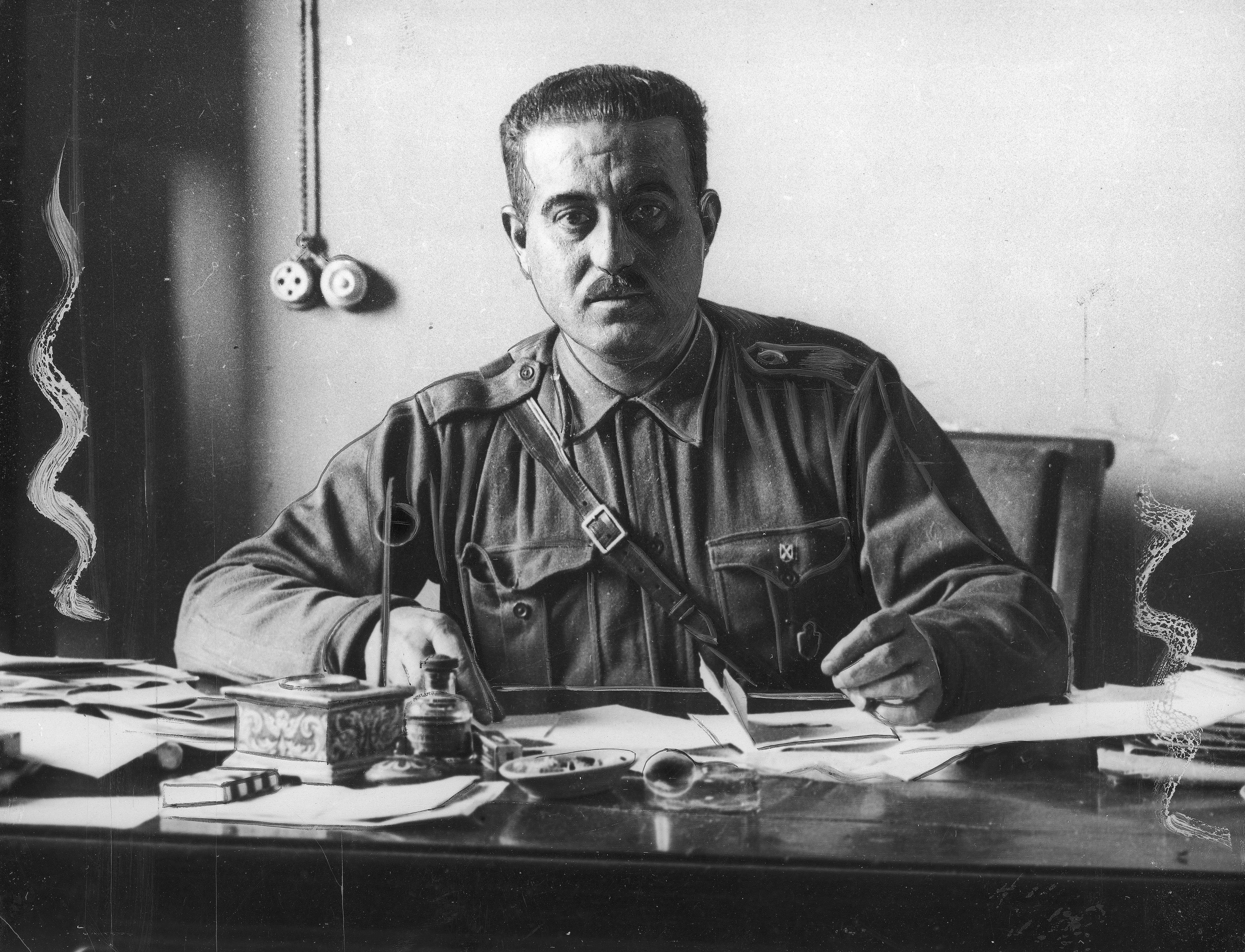
Manuel Fal Conde

Martínez was involved in Carlist plot against the Republic; in Navarre he acted as the focal point of political conspiracy. The Carlist national leader Manuel Fal initially counted Martínez among his supporters, the faction which opted for Carlist-only rising against these who preferred an alliance with the military. However, scholars claim exactly the opposite. They maintain that Martínez was within a group of Navarrese leaders who adopted an autonomous position, and that in fact Martínez sabotaged Fal's strategy. Before committing Carlism to the coup, Fal presented the leader of military conspiracy general Mola with a number of political demands; their negotiations soon reached a deadlock. At this point Martínez and Rodezno opened an alternative negotiation channel and offered almost unconditional access of Carlist paramilitary to the coup planned. Martínez spoke to Mola in person; then he travelled to France to seek approval of prince Javier, the representative of the Carlist king. The mission was successful and though highly skeptical about committing "100 years of Carlist history" for "a handful of Navarrese alcaldias", Don Javier has eventually approved of the scheme.

Having returned to Spain Martínez had one more meeting with Mola and confirmed access to the coup. He then travelled to Vitoria to brief the Alavese party leader José Luis Oriol and to seal details of the insurgency in the province. He remained in touch with provincial Navarrese leaders of the Basque nationalist organization PNV and greatly contributed to the stand they ultimately adopted; eventually Napar Buru Batzar pronounced in favor of the rebels. His premises in Banco de Bilbao at calle Chapitela and in the religious imagery shop at bajada de Javier were used as meeting points, archives and command centers. Documents with Mola's order which triggered the rising and which were posted to regional military commanders across all Spain were typed by Martínez’ son in the rear of their store. Famous Martínez’ “libreta” was heavily taken advantage of when final touches were being added to plans of the rising in the province. His data on structures, organization, reliable people and resources was the statistics vital for the operational scheme and it finally contributed to swift takeover of power in Navarre.

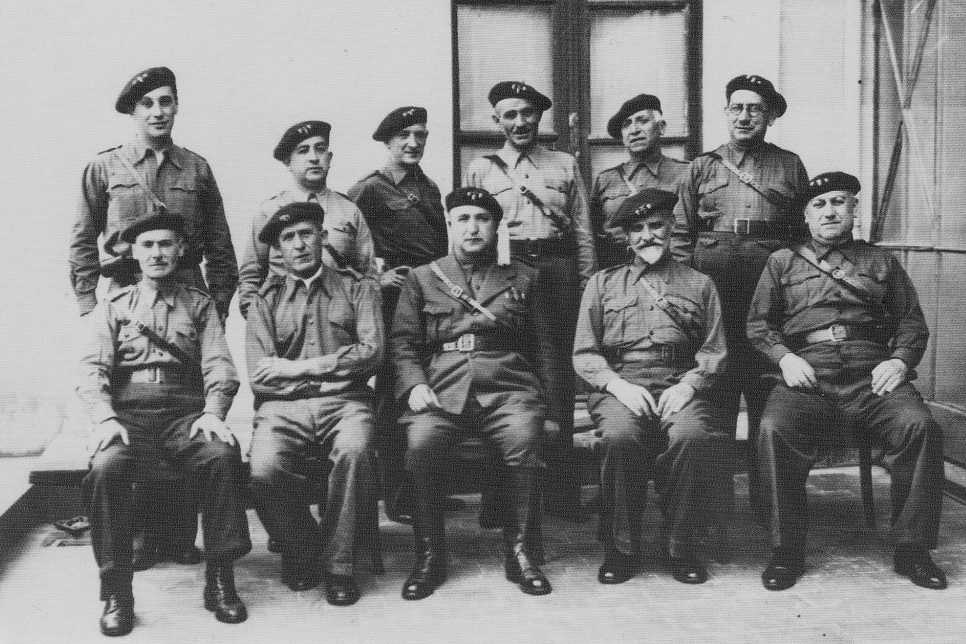
Martínez in Junta Central

Following rebel seizure of Navarre on 20 July the regional Carlist executive re-formatted itself as Junta Central Carlista de Guerra de Navarra with Joaquín Baleztena as president and Martínez Berasáin as his deputy. However, scholars claim that Martínez was hombre fuerte of the organization and that he remained its actual leader. It is not clear whether he superseded Baleztena or whether the latter acknowledged Martínez’ contacts, energy and skills and voluntarily ceded the leading role. Either in late July or in August his status was confirmed formally; in early September 1936 JCCGN publicly declared Martínez its jefe, with Baleztena named the honorary president. Fal remained skeptical about autonomous position adopted by the Junta, yet he decided to acknowledge it and named Martínez "comisario carlista de guerra de Navarra".

== Towards unification (1936–1937) ==
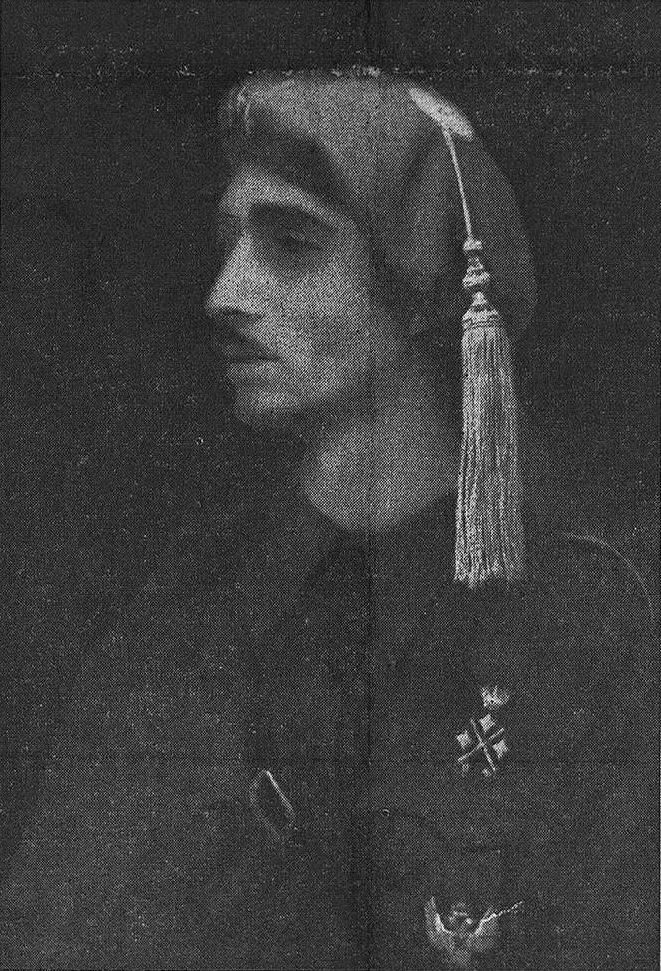
Don Javier, 1930s

Throughout late 1936 Martínez remained the man who both formally and actually controlled Carlist structures in the region. In October he travelled to Vienna to attend the funeral of deceased king Alfonso Carlos; as president of JCCGN he presided over local rallies and represented Navarre away, e.g. during a gathering in Córdoba. Under his guidance the Navarrese Carlists tried to build a complex institutional structure, which by some scholars is dubbed a "quasi-state"; Martínez himself was triple hating. Other authors underline his role in rearguard repression, name him "major criminal" and held him responsible for "exterminio de navarros republicanos". Martínez’ relations with the Carlist regent-claimant remained thorny. Though in December 1936 Don Javier in an effusive letter thanked him for his effort, at the same time he demanded explanations about JCCGN role in blocking his plan to agree prisoner exchange with the autonomous Basque government.

At least since January 1937 Martínez held talks with local Falangist politicians about sharing of power in Navarre, yet his motives and strategy are not clear. In February he travelled to the Portuguese Insua. Don Javier and the party executive discussed the looming threat of forced amalgamation into a state party; Martínez was also confirmed as member of the national Carlist executive. At the time it was already clear that Martínez with Rodezno co-led the faction which advocated compliance with Franco's pressure and in open opposition to Fal pushed for some sort of political unification. They formed another body, named Consejo de la Tradición, which added to confusion and was a measure to outmaneuver Don Javier and the national executive; Martínez was nominated the vice-president. During a sitting of the Carlist executive in Burgos in March 1937 he engineered what amounted to an internal coup within the organization. A detachment of armed Navarrese requetés led by his nephew Benito Santestebán arrived officially to ensure safety, but its presence created a threatening atmosphere; Martínez claimed he had nothing to do with it. Eventually the council recommended to continue unification talks.

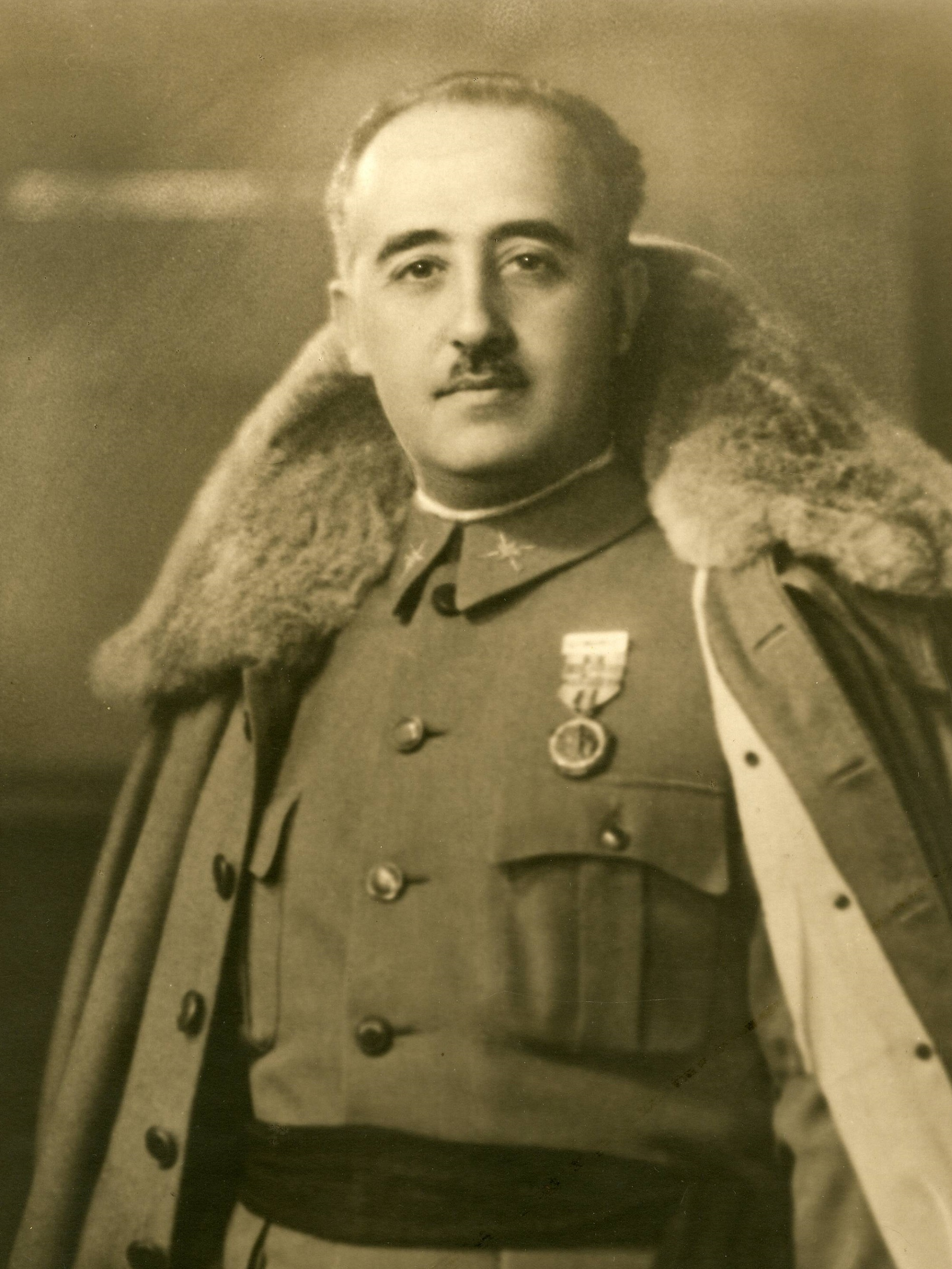
Francisco Franco

When Martínez travelled to Portugal to brief the exiled Fal Conde on latest developments, the latter was furious. Fal considered Martínez and Rodezno rebels and intended to depose them. However, away and isolated, he was increasingly powerless. During another session of Carlist executive in early April in Burgos the tension was running high; Martínez was already openly speaking in unification terms. It was agreed to form a delegation which would include him and talk to Don Javier. In Franco's headquarters he was viewed as tractable and reasonable. On 12 April Martínez, Rodezno, Ulibarri and Florida were invited to Salamanca; caudillo informed them that unification was a matter of days, that their concerns were acknowledged and that there was nothing to worry about. Few days later an "Asamblea Extraordinaria de la CT de Navarra" – again with heavy presence of Santestebán-led requetés – pronounced firmly in favor of political unification. On 20 April the Franco headquarters issued the unification decree.

== Early Francoism (1937–1945) ==
Falangist standard

Franco's decree of 22 April nominated 4 Carlists to Junta Política, the executive of the newly created state party Falange Española Tradicionalista; however, Martínez was not among them. Later this month he and other Navarrese Traditionalists travelled to Salamanca to voice their disappointment about terms of the unification and minoritarian position of the Carlists, yet all this perfectly within limits of loyalty to the caudillo. In line with the decree, which abolished all other political organizations, JCCGN no longer met and effectively it ceased to operate. On 30 April Martínez was nominated delegado provincial of FET in Navarre; he accepted the nomination and published his effusive thanks. Unlike his son, who viewed the unification as Franco's "stab in the back", Martínez genuinely believed that in the new organization the Carlists could have the upper hand. In late spring of 1937 he tried to format the merger as Comunión Tradicionalista absorbing Falange. He complained to the FET central command that the Navarrese party secretary Daniel Arraiza Goñi, himself a Falangist old shirt, did not demonstrate enough enthusiasm about the unification; in effect, Arraiza was removed from his post. However, Martínez’ triumph was short-lived; ultimately the attempt to create a Carlist Navarrese fiefdom failed and some sort of Carlist-Falangist balance of power has been established. One scholar claims he resigned as the FET provincial jefe in November 1937; however, he was noted as "camarada delegado provincial" in February 1938.

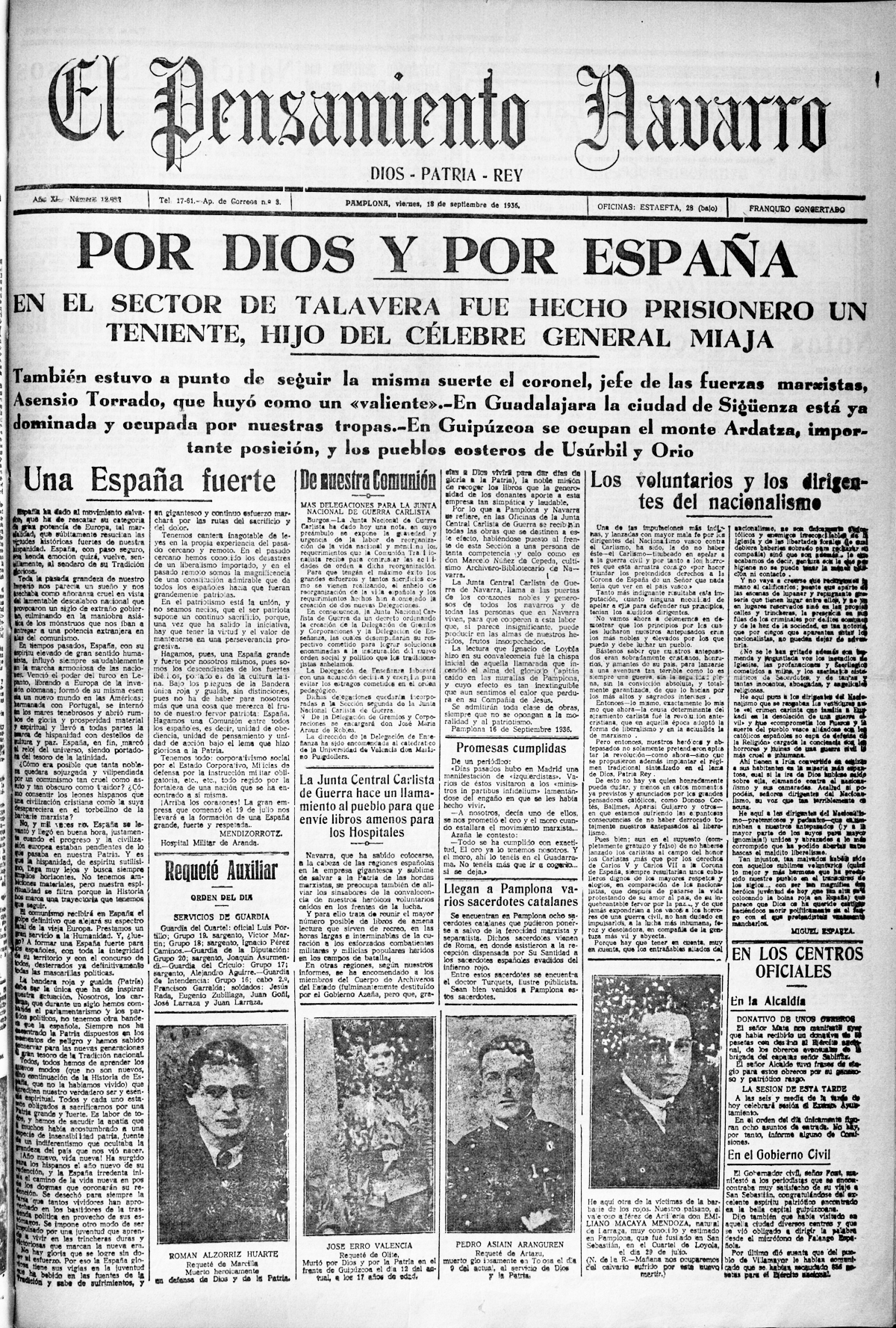
El Pensamiento Navarro

Some time in late 1938 or early 1939 Martínez was nominated vice-president of Diputación Foral de Navarra, the provincial self-government which at the time was appointed by the military administration. Since presidency of the body was by default held by the civil governor, Martínez was effectively heading the diputación. There is no information available on his activity at this role, and his tenure was brief. In unspecified circumstances he left the job; in the spring of 1940 the vice-presidency was already held by Rodezno. None of the sources consulted provides any information on official Martínez’ assignments during the early 1940s and it is not clear whether he fell from grace, withdrew or was otherwise outmaneuvered. He remained active within informal Carlist command layer in Navarre and tried to preserve party assets in the region. He retained seat in executive board of El Pensamiento Navarro, to spare amalgamation into the FET media machinery formally owned by a commercial company. Within this body he sided with Rodezno and in the early 1940s he worked to contain influence of Fal Conde, who struggled to retain control over the newspaper. He hailed Joaquín Baleztena as "nuestro presidente", the authentic authority and Jefe Regional of the movement. In 1943 Martínez was among co-signatories of so-called Reclamación del Poder; the document, issued in name of Carlist pundits, was intended for Franco and in polite but firm terms demanded instauration of the Traditionalist monarchy. It was left unanswered, though there were also no measures adopted against the signatories.

== Last years (after 1945) ==
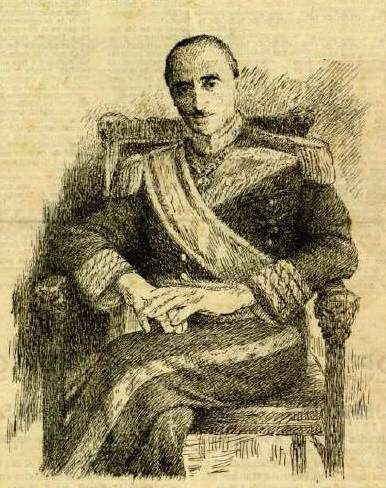
Don Javier, 1950s

Martínez resumed his job in Banco de Bilbao and was manager of its Pamplona branch office; as such he enjoyed decision-making capacity beyond financial services. Politically he retained notional loyalty to Don Javier, yet in the late 1940s he was firmly among the rodeznistas, who pressed the candidature of Don Juan as the legitimate Carlist heir. In 1946 he co-signed a letter to the regent; the document in polite but firm terms suggested that the regency be terminated. When Ferrer in name of the falcondistas confronted projuanista trend with aggressive pamphlet, Martínez replied with a protest letter. In 1947, in wake of the Law of Succession campaign, with a group of Carlist Navarrese personalities he sent a letter to Franco; it advocated immediate monarchical restoration in line with the Traditionalist principles. At the turn of the decades Martínez was moderately engaged in Carlist competition with Falangism, both trying to achieve political domination in the province. In 1951 Joaquín Baleztena, politically in-between Fal and Rodezno, nominated him to the new Junta Regional. In 1952 the new Carlist regional secretary Francisco Javier Astraín tried to engineer a move towards collaboration with the regime and bank on Martínez forming part of "oligarquía próxima al franquismo", but the plan was eventually abandoned.

Following some 10 years away from the public eye Martínez resumed political activity when he was already in the retirement age. In 1954 his return to nationwide politics was marked by being awarded Gran Cruz de la Orden del Merito Civil, an honor granted to people that the regime intended to distinguish. In 1955 he entered the Francoist parliament, Cortes Españolas, hand-picked by caudillo in the pool reserved for his personal nominees. None of the sources consulted provides information on mechanism of his return to officialdom and whether it was related to some re-dressing of the regime; Franco intended to shake off remaining para-fascist vestiges and introduced to the Cortes a large number of new appointees, including the Traditionalists.

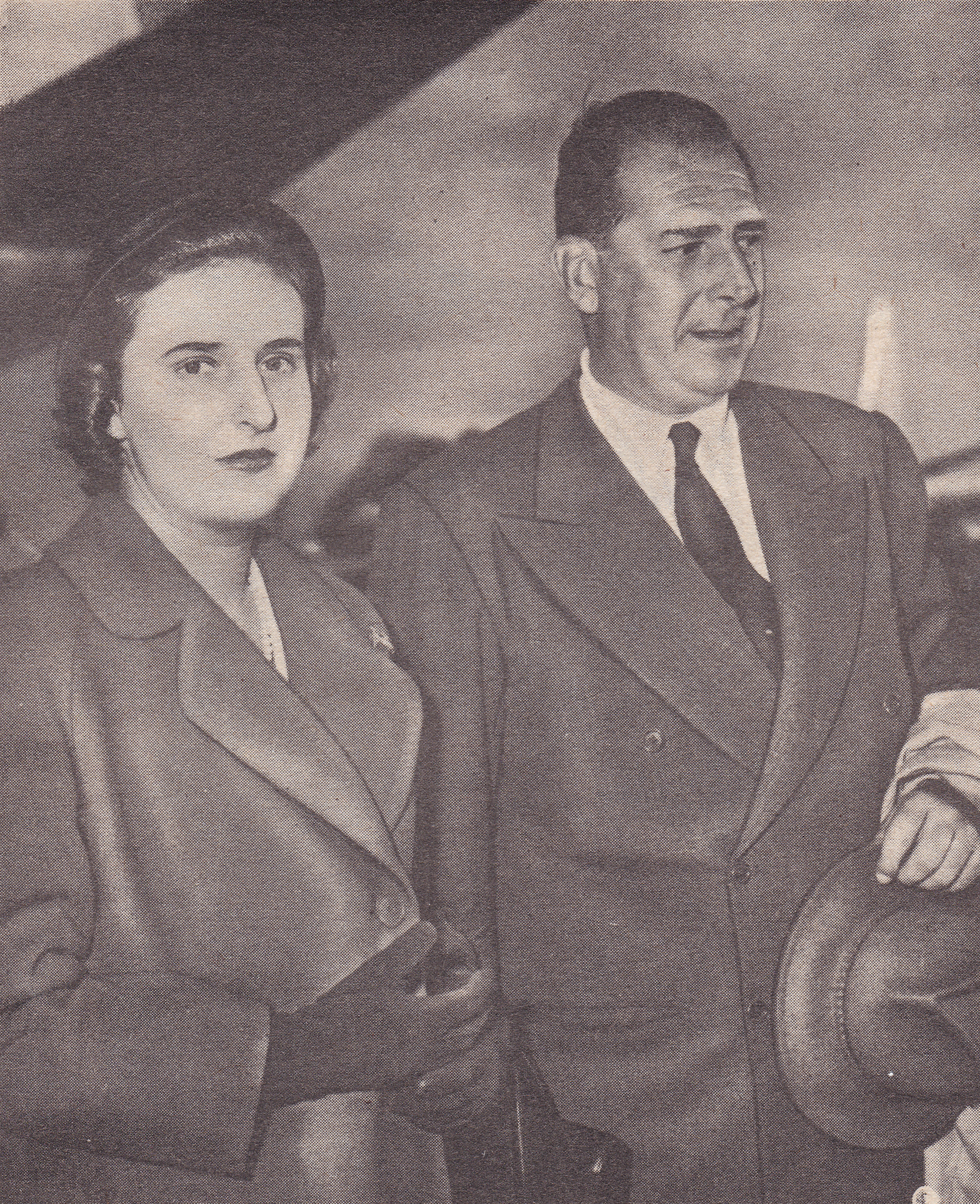
Don Juan, 1957

In 1957 Martínez definitely broke with Don Javier and the Javierista branch of Carlism. Within a large contingent of Traditionalists he visited the Alfonsist claimant Don Juan in his Estoril residence and declared him the legitimate Carlist heir; because of Martínez’ record and former position in the party, he was among the most eminent "estorilos". He remained somewhat uneasy about publication of Acto de Estoril in El Pensamiento Navarro, yet his reservations were related to economic matters; he was apprehensive about potential negative impact on readership of the newspaper. His term in Consejo de Administración was anyway about to be over; he stepped down to be succeeded by his own son. The pro-Juanista demonstration did not impair his position within the regime. When his Cortes term expired in 1958 Franco re-appointed Martínez for another one, again from the pool of his personal nominees. Little is known of his labors in the chamber, except that in the late 1950s he served in the parliamentary commission entrusted with analysis of the draft of new Leyes Fundamentales.

== See also ==
- Traditionalism (Spain)
- Carlo-francoism
- Carlism
