= Jesús Cora y Lira =

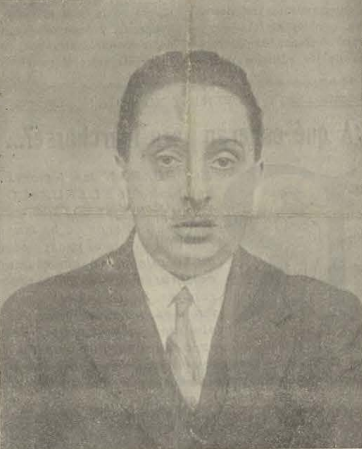
- Born: Jesús Cora y Lira; 1890; Lugo, Spain
- Died: 1969 (aged 78–79); Viveiro, Spain
- Occupation: military
- Known for: politician
- Political party: Comunión Jaimista, Unión Patriótica, Comunión Tradicionalista, Comunión Católico-Monárquica

Jesús de Cora y Lira, 1st Count of Cora y Lira (1890–1969) was a Spanish soldier and a Carlist politician. In the navy juridical arm he rose to general auditor, a rank equivalent to counter-admiral. He is known mostly as political leader of Carloctavismo, a branch of Carlism which during early Francoism advocated a claim to the Spanish throne raised by Carlos Pio Habsburgo-Lorena y Borbón.

== Family and youth ==
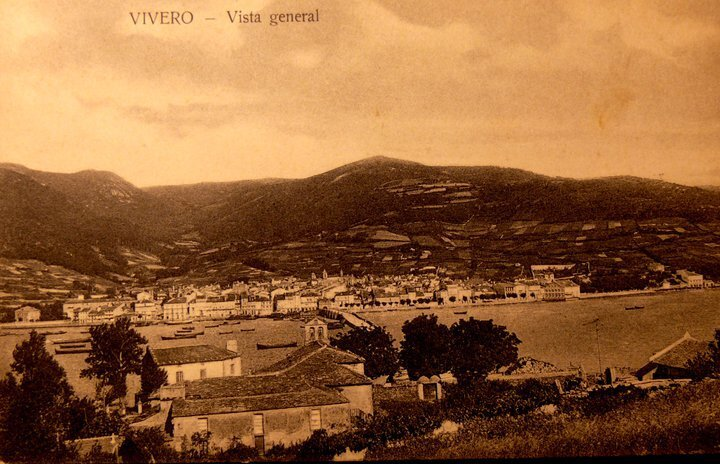
Viveiro, early 20th c.

Along his paternal line Jesús Cora y Lira was descendant to an established, noble Galician family. The Coras have been for centuries related to the province of Lugo and the comarca of Viveiro. Their first representative was noted in the 15th century and some grew to local regidores; also during late Restauración a distant Jesús' relative, Purificación de Cora y Más Villafuerte, apart from setting up a local daily El Progreso served also as a civil governor. Jesús' great-grandfather, José María de Cora Aguiar y Maseda, was a military and participated in wars of the Napoleonic era. His son and Jesús' grandfather, Dario de Cora y Cadórniga, joined the Carlists during the First Carlist War. His son and Jesús' father, Jesús Cora y Cora (died 1928), served in the navy, though not in combat units but as an official in its juridical branch. Specializing in crew contracting issues he grew to teniente coronel auditor and as head of Cuerpo Jurídico de la Armada became a distinguished figure in the entire Galicia, not infrequently reported in societé columns of the local press. At unspecified time he married Elisa de Lira y Montenegro; they settled in Viveiro.

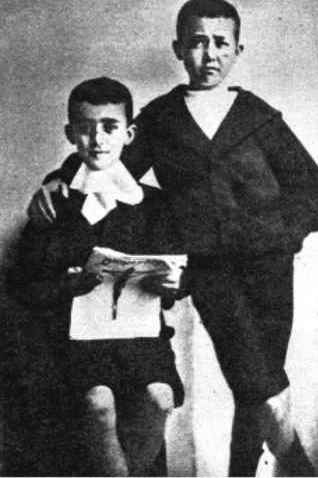
Franco in Colegio

The couple had 7 children, Jesús born as the second and the last son. All were brought up in fervently Catholic ambience; the eldest of the siblings José was also a Carlist and the two youngest sisters became nuns. The young Jesús was first educated in the neighboring Ferrol, where he frequented Colegio del Sagrado Corazón de Jesús, a local middle-class school. It is in the college that he met Francisco Franco, two years his junior, the acquaintance which was to last for decades to come. It is not known when the adolescent Cora completed his Ferrol education; he then moved to Madrid and enrolled at Universidad Central, pursuing law studies at Facultad de Derecho. He graduated at unspecified year though no later than in 1910; he then followed closely in the footsteps of his father, applying to Cuerpo Jurídico of the navy and having been nominated aspirante. Also at unspecified time prior to the mid-1920s Jesús Cora y Lira married María do Cármen López Prieto; nothing is known about his wife except that she outlived her husband. It is not clear whether the couple had any children. None of the sources consulted explicitly claims they had no issue, though no descendants are listed on genealogical sites, when discussing whereabouts of the Cora family on the societé columns the local press has never acknowledged any children and none are mentioned among many relatives listed in Cora's obituary.

== Military career ==
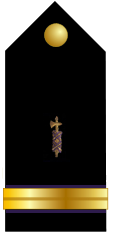
teniente auditor strap

In 1911 Cora was listed as asesor in the naval Cuerpo de Aspirantes, assigned to Viveiro. Having passed in 1918 to Cuerpo Jurídico de la Armada he assumed duties in Cartagena. In 1920 he was promoted to teniente auditor de cuarta clase, two years later reaching the third class. He left Cartagena and was assigned to Asesoría General in Madrid. His career continued with the 1923 advancement to teniente auditor de segunda clase; at unspecified date but prior to the spring of 1925 he was already comandante auditor, a rank equivalent to capitán de corbeta or major in most European armies. He is not listed as engaged in any naval combat operations, especially during the Riff War; it seems that until the fall of the monarchy he served performing office jobs in Madrid.

The Republican government embarked on reform of the army; the naval Cuerpo Jurídico was to be turned into a civil service. In September 1931 Cora was promoted to teniente coronel only to be released from the staff job and assigned to Ferrol. In December 1931 he was already listed as retired, which permitted his return – already as a civilian – to Madrid; it is not clear whether he resigned voluntarily or was pushed into retirement. Until the July 1936 coup he was not a single time noted in the press as holding a military assignment.

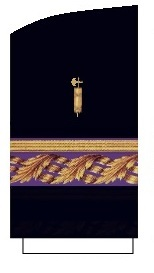
general auditor sleeve strap

On July 12, 1936 Cora with his wife left Madrid for his native Viveiro; none of the sources consulted identifies him as involved in military conspiracy and the press acknowledged that he was to commence summer holidays. Details of his activity during the first months of the Civil War are not known; in October 1936 Cora was again in the navy. He formed part of the Ferrol jury which court-martialled officers from the light cruiser Almirante Cervera, charged by the rebels with mutiny; he co-signed the death sentence of teniente Luis Sánchez Pinzón, jefe de servicios radiotelegráficos of the cruiser, who was executed shortly afterwards. Cora spent the rest of the civil war as Fiscal de la Auditoria de la Base Naval Principal de El Ferrol; following the Nationalist victory in the summer of 1939 he was promoted to colonel.

Late 1939 Cora was assigned to an unspecified navy job in Madrid; three years later he was nominated consejero of Consejo Supremo de Justicia Militar. Also in 1942 Cora was promoted to general auditor, a rank equivalent to contralmirante, in 1945 awarded Gran Cruz del Mérito Naval and in 1947 Gran Cruz del Mérito Militar. When serving as General Auditor de la Armada he was at least 3 times, in 1945, 1948 and 1956 officially received by Franco. Having reached the regular retirement age, in early 1956 Cora was moved to reserve, enabling his return as a retiree to Viveiro. Retaining his General Auditor rank he was officially assigned "a las órdenes del señor Ministro", and continued with honorary duties as consejero togado of Consejo Supremo de Justicia Militar into the early 1960s.

== Early politics: carlista, regionalista, upetista and carlista (before 1933) ==
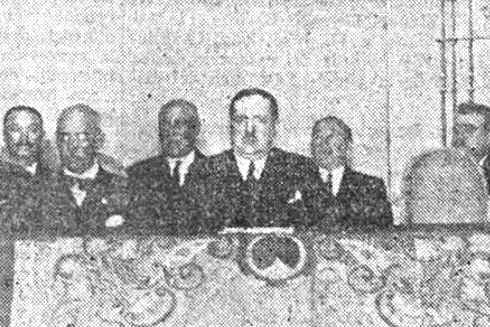
Cora y Lira (centre), 1920s

Having Carlist antecedents among his ancestors, he adhered to the Carlist cause from an early age. While he was studying in Madrid he was the secretary of the local Carlist Youth and pronounced speeches at Carlist feasts. Back in Galicia, the newspaper he contributed to is by one scholar noted as leaning towards Jaimismo. In the 1910s he was vaguely associated with the right wing; in 1918 Cora presented his bid for the Cortes from his native Mondoñedo district, by some sources referred to as a Maurista and by some as a regionalista. Both denominations might have been correct, though the question proved pointless as he lost to a Liberal candidate. None of the sources consulted records his renewed bid until the fall of Restauración liberal democracy.

Following the advent of dictatorship Cora engaged in the emerging primoderiverista institutions and remained active also during declining phases of the regime. It is not clear when he engaged in Unión Patriótica, but in the late 1920s he grew to mid-range positions of the Madrid organization; in 1928 active in its Sección de Propaganda, in 1930 he entered the UP executive of the Congreso district. During political thaw of the dictablanda Cora engaged back in the re-established Carlist party of the mainstream Jaimista branch. In the first months of the Republic he was already Jefe of the Madrid provincial organization of the Jaimist Partido Católico Monárquico, in early 1932 re-united with offshoot branches in Comunión Tradicionalista.

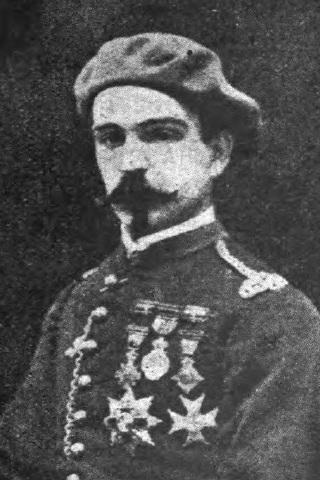
Juan Pérez Nájera (photo from the 1870s)

Within Carlist structures Cora emerged as a restless politician; his voice was heard in the party ranks nationwide mostly thanks to El Cruzado Español, a weekly mouthpiece of the Madrid branch of the party where he defended a far right policy and used the pseudonyms Goiriz,J. de Arco, Incógnito Leal and others. In 1932 he replaced Guillermo Arsenio de Izaga as the director of the paper. Following assumption of the Carlist claim by an 82-year-old pretender Don Alfonso Carlos, it became evident that the Carlist dynasty would soon extinguish. Cora joined the group led by Juan Pérez Nájera, which vehemently opposed sorting the dynastical crisis by an agreement with the Alfonsinos and instead advocated appointing an heir during Alfonso Carlos' lifetime. Initially Cora was not among the group's most active members and did not sign a February 1932 letter to the claimant, openly presenting the cause. However, in late 1932 he emerged as their key theorist, publishing a legal analysis of the Carlist succession law titled El futuro Caudillo de la Tradición Española – Estudio Jurídico, Histórico y Político.

The theory presented by Cora referred to an earlier 1914 interpretation, which read that in case of all male branches extinguished or excluded, heritage rights might be transmitted to her son by an oldest daughter of the last legitimate king. The group - already known as the Cruzadistas - focused on Doña Blanca, setting their sights on her youngest son, Barcelona-resident Carlos Pio Habsburgo-Lorena; they started to call for a grand Carlist assembly, which would settle the succession issue. Don Alfonso Carlos acknowledged this as a breach of loyalty and in 1933 expulsed the Cruzadistas, including Cora, from the Comunión.

== Cruzadista (1933-1943) ==
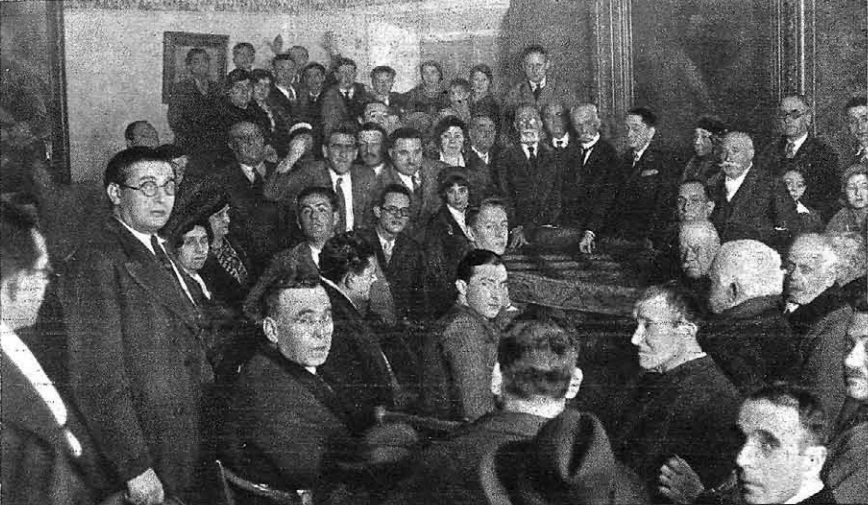
Najera leading Madrid Cruzadistas, 1930s

Cora continued his political career beyond the official party structures, though its direction was initially not clear. In the 1933 electoral campaign to the Cortes he was to enter a joint Right-wing local Galician alliance known as Unión Orensana de Derechas, standing as representative of an Agrarian-Traditionalist grouping. However, the mainstream Carlist faction, locally known as "oficialistas", objected to his candidature; as a result, Cora withdrew from the list and he let the steam off by writing bitter letters to the press.

He continued as a Cruzadista. The group, now reduced to a minor secessionist Carlist branch though enjoying some support also in other regions, refused to budge; moreover, they assumed a challenging if not provocative name of Núcleo de la Lealtad. In July 1934 Cora took part in a meeting of Zumárraga, where dynastical theory laid earlier was confirmed and openly specified with regard to Doña Blanca. As the expulsed were trying to institutionalize their movement and build an own organization, Cora was provisionally appointed jefe of its Madrid branch. In 1935 Cora participated in a gathering in Zaragoza, styled as a Magna Asamblea advocated earlier, and formed part of its presidential board. It did not challenge the Carlist reign of Don Alfonso Carlos, but in utter violation of his instructions it adopted the theory laid by Cora and declared that after death of the king, Doña Blanca would be in position to transmit hereditary rights to Don Carlos, who at that time was living abroad. The Carlist leader Manuel Fal promptly disauthorised the gathering.

Following the 1936 outbreak of the Spanish Civil War Cora and the other Cruzadistas were re-admitted to the mainstream Carlist structures, though none of the sources consulted mentions his Carlist political activity in the late 1930s. Nothing is known about his position on regency of Don Javier, assumed after the death of Don Alfonso Carlos in 1936, or on forced amalgamation of Carlist organizations into Falange Española Tradicionalista in 1937 and afterwards. When speaking in public he limited himself to praising general patriotic values, like in a 1938 address to the Lugo branch of Juventud Antoniana.

Carlist standard

Cora is not listed among those who in the early 1940s reverted to the Cruzadista claim and raised the cause of Don Carlos. At that time following the death of Pérez Nájera the group had no clear leader, though it was Antonio Lizarza who led many specific initiatives. They climaxed in 1943: in March that year Don Carlos returned to Spain and re-settled in Barcelona. In May Cora took advantage of his personal Galician links and visited the Franco's residence of El Pardo. Though he did not speak to caudillo himself, he agreed with his Jefe de la Casa Civil, Julio Muñoz Aguilar, that public promotional campaign of the royal claim of Don Carlos might commence across Spain. In June the latter issued a manifesto, announcing his personal claim to throne. The former Cruzadistas greeted him as Carlos VIII, now turning into Carloctavistas.

== Carloctavista: serving Don Carlos (1943-1953) ==
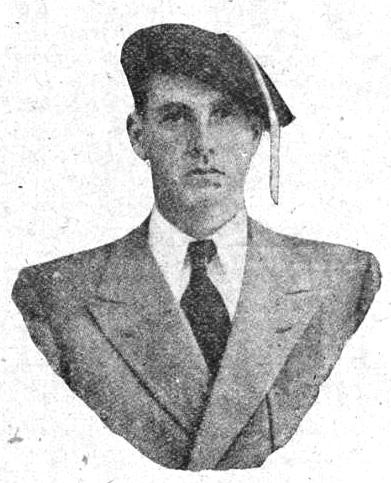
Carlos VIII

By voicing their support to the Carlist claim of Carlos VIII, Cora and other Carloctavistas openly breached loyalty to the regency of Don Javier; hence, they were again expulsed from mainstream Carlism by its political leader, Manuel Fal. Don Carlos started to organize own structures: Comunión Católico-Monárquica and Juventudes Carlistas, carefully styled not to challenge the Francoist ban on political parties except FET; in late 1943 he appointed Cora his secretario general. At this point Cora emerged as political leader of the group.

Though some high-positioned collaborative Carlists like the Cortes speaker Esteban Bilbao were leaning towards cautious support for Carlos VIII, it was Cora y Lira who emerged as the most distinguished partisan of the cause. It is not clear, however, who has contributed most to engineering and daily execution of the Carloctavista strategy of total commitment to the regime. None of the sources clearly refers to Cora as to the brain behind the party game plan, though at least at some points he played a vital role in the planning process. Some scholars refer to him as merely a transmission belt from the Falange headquarters, where all the strings were pulled. Around 1950 Cora's leadership went under criticism with emergence of Juntas de Ofensivas de Agitación Carloctavista, Movimiento de Agitación Social Católico Monárquista and Frente Nacional Carlista, new Carloctavista structures challenging the collaborative strategy. Though it was Cora who laid out initial reading of the Carloctavista claim, in the 1940s as legal expert he withdrew to the back seat; his 1932 booklet was replaced as key theoretical work first by an anonymous pamphlet issued in 1948 and then by a lecture published by Antonio Lizarza in 1950.

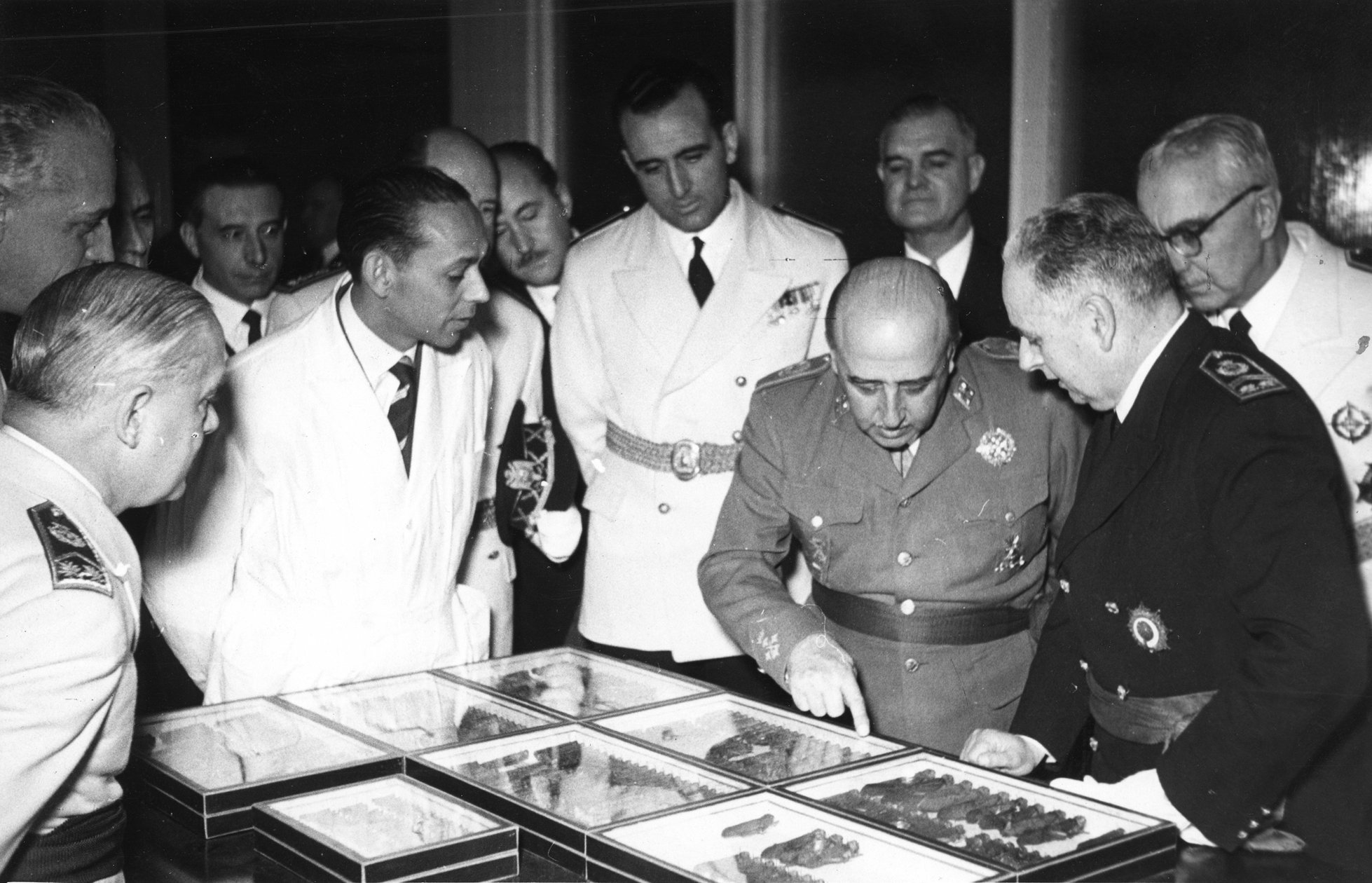
Franco (mid-1950s)

In daily business Cora's role was about propaganda activities and manning the interface to official authorities. Featuring "Viva Franco y Carlos VIII" as the slogan, he accompanied the claimant in his numerous tours across the country, apart from close meetings punctuated by public gatherings styled as "concentraciones patrióticas". On the official front, he worked to ensure at least amicable permission if not approval on part of the regime, exploiting his links in El Pardo and among the top Falangists. He played down setbacks like the 1948 Franco's agreement with Don Juan and at some points believed that official nomination of Carlos VIII as the future jefe de estado was near. However, his repeated attempts to arrange Don Carlos' meeting with Franco bore no fruit until 1952. The encounter left many Carloctavistas ecstatic, especially that soon afterwards Cora ensured Franco's acceptance of the Carlos-VIII-created Orden de San Carlos Borromeo. However, any official, semi-official or unofficial endorsement of Don Carlos's claim on part of the regime failed to materialize before in late 1953 he unexpectedly died of cerebral hemorrhage. During the funeral ceremonies of late 1953 and early 1954 Cora enjoyed probably most media attention in his life, featured in the press, radio broadcasts and newsreels.

== Carloctavista: between Don Antonio and Don Francisco (1954-1969) ==
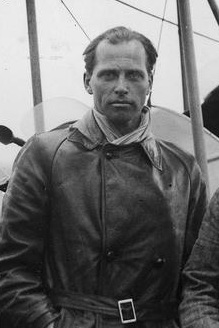
Don Antonio (earlier photo)

Though many Carloctavistas considered their cause hopeless and withdrew into privacy or joined other Carlist branches, Cora was determined to go on; he advanced the cause of an older brother of the late Don Carlos, Don Antonio, who seemed leaning towards some sort of political activity. Early 1954 Cora convinced most members of the Comunión Católico-Monárquica executive to welcome Don Antonio as Carlos IX, the move which caught him by surprise. Following a brief vacillation period, later that year Don Antonio declared that he would not assume any political activity. Though there were alternative options considered, Cora y Lira then set sights on Don Antonio's 17-year-old son Don Domingo. He launched a fund-raising campaign to facilitate his settling in Spain, until in 1955 furious might-have-been Carlos IX expulsed Cora – which was his third expulsion already – for "arbitrario ejercicio del mando".

In 1956 another brother of the late Don Carlos, Don Francisco José, challenged his older sibling and claimed monarchical rights himself; it is not clear if and to what extent this move was inspired by or agreed with Cora, who rushed to promote the claim and became the chief advocate of the new claimant. During the following years he represented Don Francisco José in Spain, the task made easier by the 1961 withdrawal of Don Antonio into privacy. In more practical terms, Cora represented his king as a lawyer, fighting nobility-related legal battles before Spanish courts; in the early 1960s they were mostly about the duque de Madrid title, traditionally claimed by Carlist pretenders and at that time coveted also by another hopeful from the Javierista branch, Don Carlos Hugo. Though he was personally admitted by Franco in 1956, 1957, 1960 1964 and 1966, it is not known whether these meetings were anything more than routine courteous receptions.

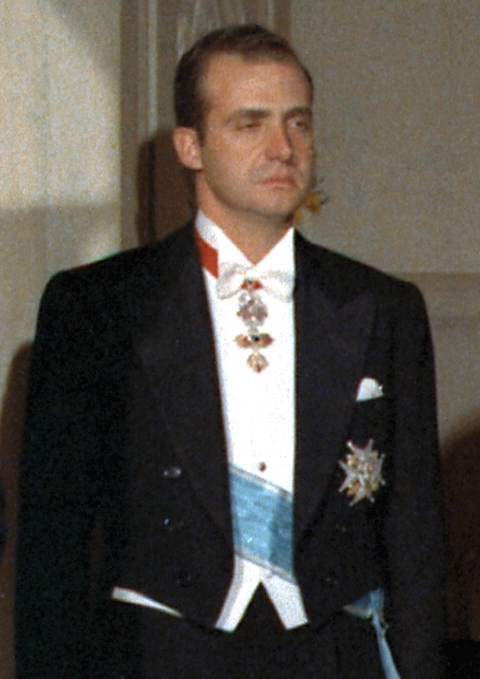
Prince of Spain

In the early 1960s Cora was leaning towards some sort of reconciliation between all Carlist offshoot branches which parted during the previous 20 years: Rodeznistas, Carloctavistas, Sivattistas and the recently separated politicians like Francisco Elías de Tejada or José Luis Zamanillo. Its objective was gaining critical mass to confront what was left of mainstream Carlism, at that time increasingly under the influence of socialist-minded Huguistas. Mocked by them as "Don Jesús", in 1964 he took part in Primer Congreso de Estudios Tradicionalistas, organized by a freshly created Traditionalist think-tank Centro de Estudios Históricos y Políticos General Zumalacárregui. At that time Carloctavismo was reduced to grouplets organized around few periodicals; their activity was boiling down to few isolated episodes. One of Cora's last public appearances was the 1966 Carloctavista gathering in Poblet. He died 3 months before his lifetime efforts crashed definitely with the July 1969 nomination of Don Juan Carlos as Principe de España and the future king of Spain. With his death Carloctavismo lost its moving spirit, not that much in terms of theory and ideology, but rather in terms of dedication and enthusiasm.

== Civil servant, publisher, regionalist, syndicalist ==
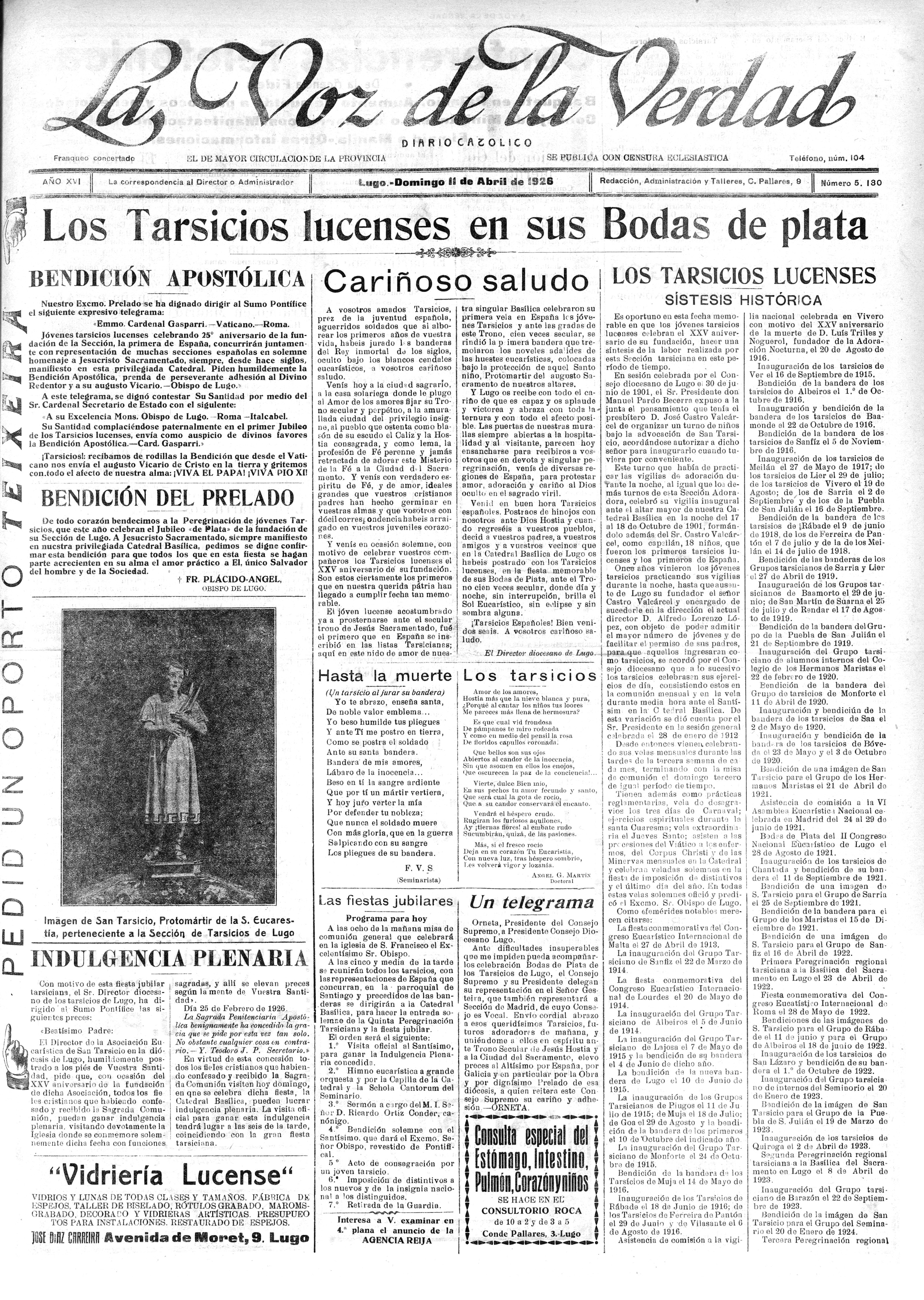
La Voz de la Verdad

It is not clear whether beyond the military realm Cora pursued his law career systematically or rather periodically, most likely when not tied up by his navy duties. The press reported him engaged in three different periods. In the 1910s he was briefly noted as the Lugo municipal attorney. In 1928-1930 he practiced as municipal judge of the Madrid Hospicio district court, but during the Republic years instead of a juez he was noted as a lawyer, member of the Madrid Colegio de Abogados. In the mid-1950s he was again noted as judge performing routine admin duties in Madrid.

Upon the 1917 launch of La Coruña-based Catholic daily El Ideal Gallego Cora was its Lugo correspondent; he contributed also to La Voz de la Verdad, the Lugo newspaper launched in 1910, issued in 2,000 copies and closely related to local diocesan organization. Already in the mid-1910s his brother José was editor-in-chief of the paper; by the end of the decade Cora assumed these duties himself, though it is not clear for how long. He might have been related to the daily also in the 1920s, as during the dictatorship it was officially issued by Sindicatos Agrarios of Lugo, organization to some extent animated by Cora. His obituaries claimed that Cora collaborated also with Madrid periodicals, though except El Cruzado Español no other title can be identified.

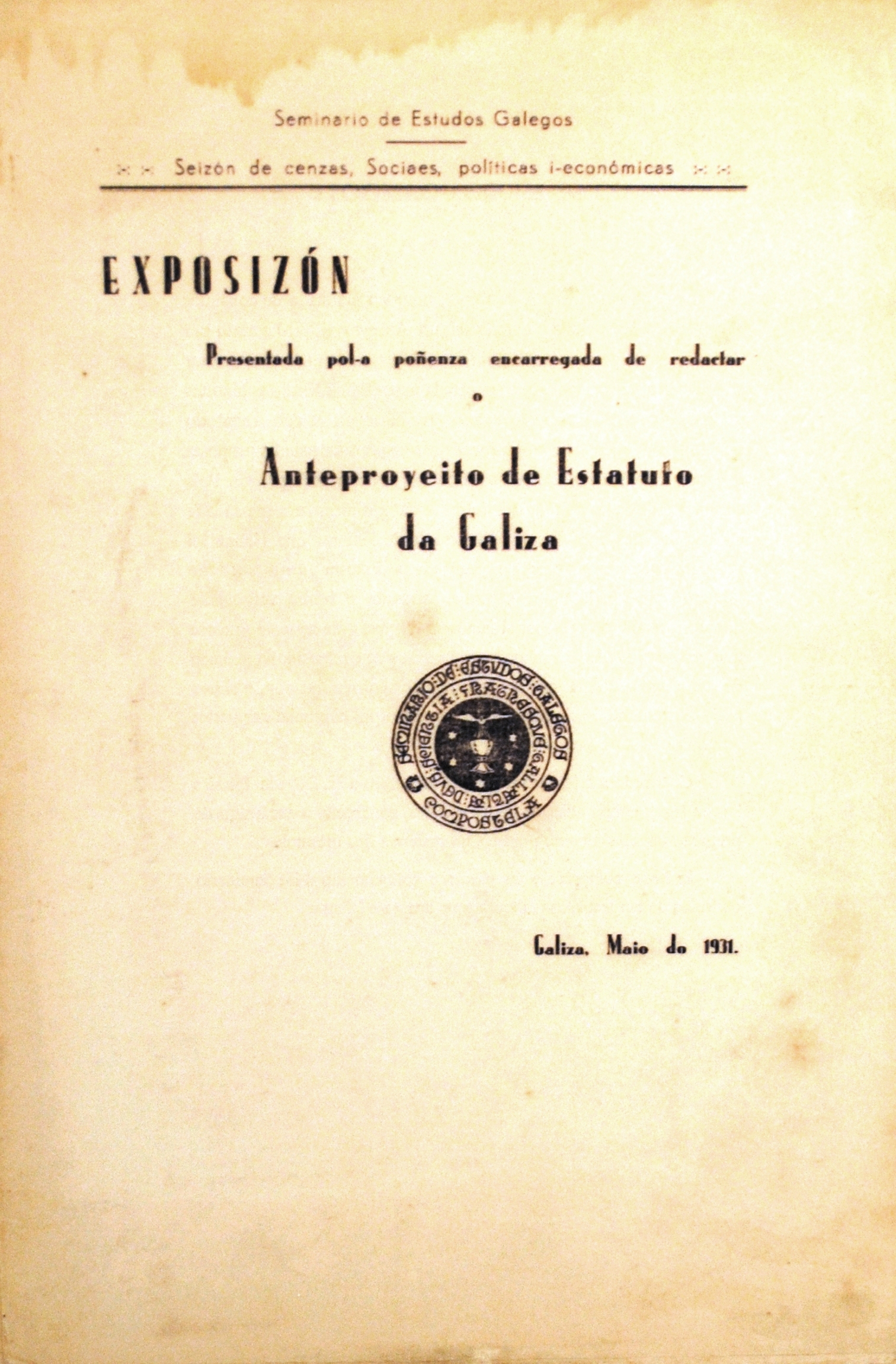
Estatuto da Galiza (draft)

Cora cherished his Galician self and demonstrated interest in regional issues as correspondent of the local press and a once-off regionalist candidate to the Cortes. During late Restauración La Voz de la Verdad opposed autonomy plans and pursued a traditional, regionalism based cultural identity, but in 1930 Cora co-drafted a document titled Aportación al futuro Estatuto de Galicia and during the Republic he was noted for supporting the autonomous statute. In Madrid he engaged in Galician organizations active in the capital, growing to vice-president of Ler Gallego in 1929. In 1931 he entered junta directiva of Secretariado de Galicia in Madrid, nominated head of its Estadistica, Sociologia y Derecho committee. Finally, during early Francoism he resumed these duties as member of Junta Directiva of Centro Gallego in Madrid.

Cora's interest in social issues is marked by his Traditionalist approach, entrenched in enmity towards laissez-faire liberalism – let alone Marxist and revolutionary ideas - and based on Catholic and gremialist solutions. First information on his activity comes from 1924, when he was noted as engaged in the local Lugo Sociedad de Pasivos. During the dictatorship he gradually focused on agrarian cooperatives; he became their public advocate and co-founded Sindicato Católico Obrero de Lugo. Following the advent of the Republic he sporadically kept addressing – in writing or during public meetings – social issues in general and agrarian ones in particular, also when related to Carlism. During Francoism Cora resumed his social interest, e.g. when active in Congreso de Orientación Social. On practical side, he engaged in charity work as hermano mayor honorario of Cofradía del Santísimo Cristo de la Piedad de Vivero.

== See also ==
- Carlism
- Carloctavismo
- Carlo-francoism
- Don Carlos
- Don Antonio
- Don Francisco Jose
