= Insúa =

Insúa is a surname. Notable people with the surname include:

- Emanuel Insúa (born 1991), Argentine footballer
- Emiliano Insúa (born 1989), Argentine footballer
- Federico Insúa (born 1980), Argentine footballer
- Pablo Insúa (born 1993), Spanish footballer
- Rubén Insúa (born 1961), Argentine football manager
