= Francisco López Sanz =

Spanish publisher and writer

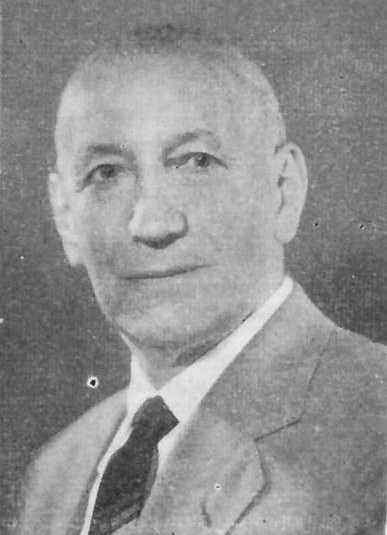
- Born: Francisco López Sanz; 1896; Pamplona, Spain
- Died: 1977 (aged 80–81); Pamplona, Spain
- Occupation: publisher
- Known for: publisher
- Political party: Carlism

Francisco López Sanz (1896-1977) was a Spanish publisher and writer, known mostly by his pen-names of Lopezarra, SAB and other. He achieved recognition as long-time manager of a local Navarrese daily El Pensamiento Navarro (1933-1966), though he was also briefly related - either as editor-in-chief, owner or author - to some 20 other periodicals. His press contributions span some 60 years, between the early 1910s and the early 1970s. Politically throughout all his life he was a firm and militant adherent of Carlism; in 1941-1944 he formed part of the regional Navarrese executive of Comunión Tradicionalista. In 1961-1967 he served two terms in the Francoist Cortes; during 3 separate stints of 1922-1923, 1930-1931 and 1940-1942 he was member of the Pamplona ayuntamiento. Today he is considered a paradigmatic exponent of heroic, Traditionalist Navarrese narrative, firmly anchored in Catholic values and a Manichean ideological perspective.

== Family and youth ==
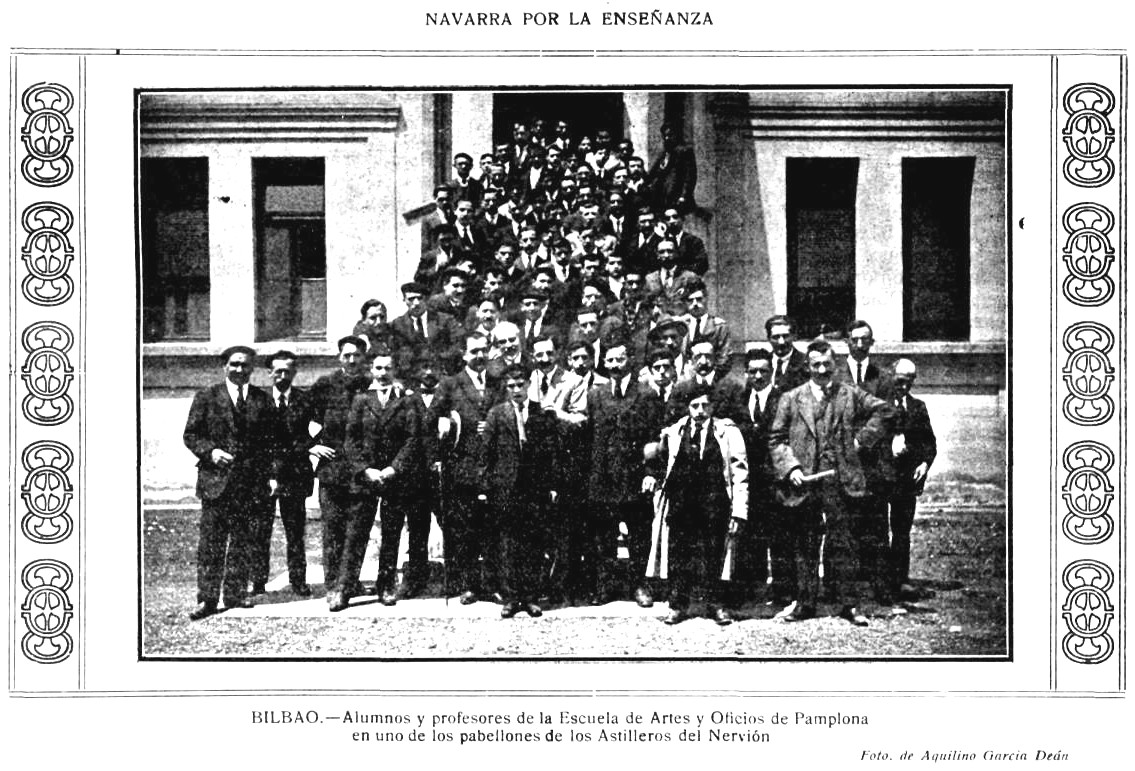
alumni of Escuela de Artes, 1910s

The earliest representative of the family identified is Manuel López Echeverria (born 1790) from the village of Torralba del Río in south-western Navarre. His son and the paternal grandfather of Francisco was Francisco López Muru (born 1826), also the native of Torralba; in 1854 he married Felipa Latasa Astiz, a girl from Mendigorria in central Navarre. None of the sources consulted provides clear information on their social status, though some suggest they were of "humble origins", most likely local farmers. In the mid-19th century Francisco and Felipa settled in Pamplona, and this is where their son and Francisco's father, Agapito López Latasa (1861-1917) was born. He joined the ranks of the urban proletariat and worked as a moulder in the local foundry workshop. In 1895 he married Baldomera Sanz Berramendi (1869-1951); though the bride was from Santesteban, a town at the Pyrenean foothills, her ancestors were also from Torralba and it seems that the families knew each other. The couple lived in the suburban Pamplonese district of Rochapea and Agapito ascended to some local recognition. It is not clear how many children they had, though Francisco had at least 4 siblings.

When aged 6–9 Francisco lived with maternal grandparents near Molina de Aragón, where his grandfather was teaching in a rural school. Himself he received the early schooling with the Marists of Pamplona; he did not pursue an academic career and received vocational training in Escuela de Artes y Oficios, also in the Navarrese capital; the year when he obtained bachillerato is unclear, probably falling on the early 1910s. In the mid-1910s (sources provide dates of 1916 and 1917) he commenced work for the Pamplonese daily El Pensamiento Navarro, either as colaborador or as member of the editorial board, in 1919 growing to full-time redactor. This would become his lifetime employment until the mid-1960s, though initially López Sanz collaborated or even animated other local and short-lived periodicals.

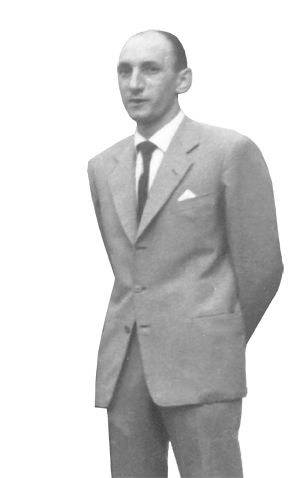
Jesús María López-Sanz Fernández

Following obligatory military service of 1921-1922, which he performed according to the scaled-down format of soldado de cuota in Regimiento de América in Morocco, in 1924 López Sanz got married. The bride was Agustina Fernández Otamendi (1893–1968), a girl from Guirguillano in central Navarre. There is close to nothing known about her parents, though they must have enjoyed some recognition as their passing away was acknowledged in the local press. Francisco and Agustina settled and lived in Pamplona. They had 3 children, two boys and a girl. The best known one was Jesús María Lopez-Sanz Fernández (1928–1980). He became a locally recognized personality, and this was on two accounts. One was his activity as first a handball player and then the promoter of handball, who contributed to development of this sport in Spain. Another was his professional career of a pediatrician, which gained him prestige, respect, and a "Doctor López-Sanz" street in Pamplona. His son and the grandson of López Sanz, Jesus López Sanz Echarren (born 1965), is a moderately known filmmaker and remains active in the Navarrese cultural ambience.

== Late Restoration and Dictatorship ==
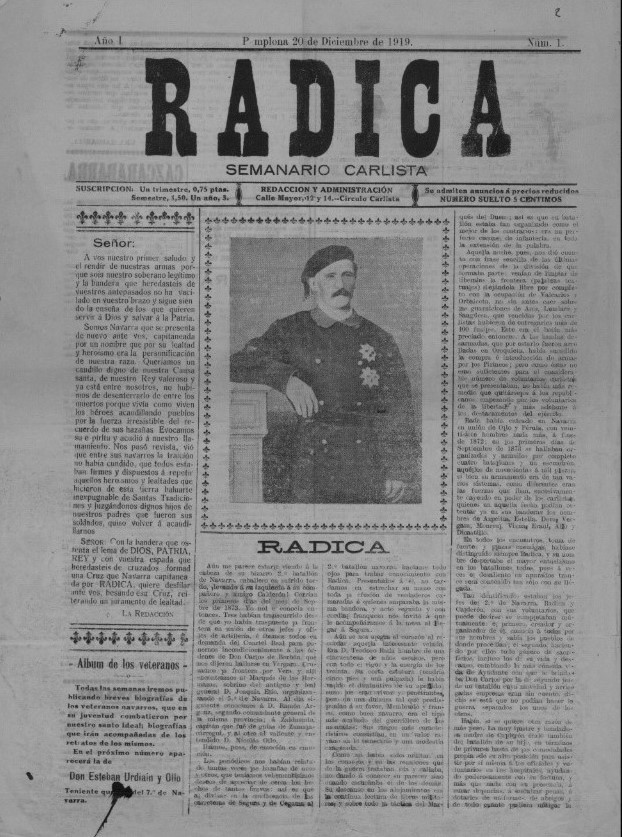
Radica, 1919

Francisco's ancestors were die-hard Carlists; his father at the age of 12 escaped from home to join legitimist troops. Francisco inherited the outlook in its most belligerent format. His first press excursions are related to a Traditionalist bulletin La Trinchera; in 1914 Francisco used to contribute combative articles, aimed against the faction known as Napartarras; López Sanz lambasted their alleged separatism and dubbed them "these swine". In 1915 he co-animated Sindicatos Libres, Catholic trade unions. Already as colaborador or redactor of El Pensamiento Navarro and together with Ignacio Baleztena in December 1919 he launched an own periodical, Radica. Its emergence was triggered by the Mellista breakup within Carlism. The first issue declared total loyalty to the claimant and the subsequent ones kept mocking Vázquez de Mella, "Juan el Vanidoso" and "camaleón". Another omnipresent thread was cherishing local Navarrese identity; at one point the editors declared "odio eterno al centralismo y un asco mortal al patrioterismo". López Sanz published under his surname, as "Lopezarra", "F.L.S.", and perhaps also using other, unidentified pen-names. The periodical - intended as a weekly but in fact an irregular - briefly claimed to be the paper of Juventudes Jaimistas de Navarra. Some articles were at least acknowledged in El Correo Español, a Madrid daily which aspired to the role of official Traditionalist mouthpiece. However, Radica struggled financially and following desperate appeals for subscription, the last issue appeared in August 1921.

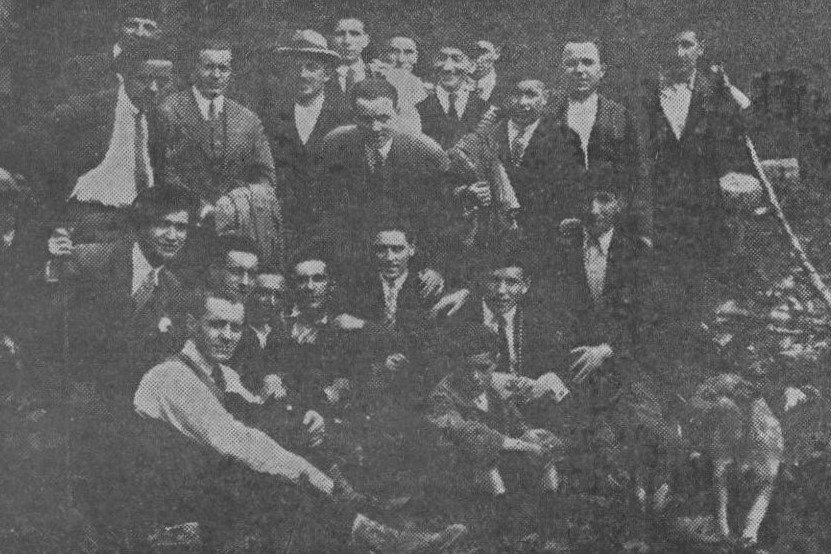
pilgrimage to Irantzu, 1927 (centre)

In April 1922 the 26-year-old López Sanz, a barely known redactor or "cronista deportivo", stood in elections to the Pamplona town hall. He was running in the Casas Consistoriales district and with 414 votes gathered he emerged victorious. The term proved to be rather brief, as following the Primo de Rivera coup in October 1923 the Pamplona ayuntamiento was dissolved and replaced with comisión gestora. In the mid-1920s López Sanz acted as president of Juventud Jaimista de Pamplona, though under the dictatorship the organisation was reduced to para-political activities like excursions to the Iranzu sanctuary. Another motion in the like was contributing to homage album for Francisco Oller, where he published poetry and graphics. In the early 1920s López Sanz political articles started to appear in El Pensamiento; he kept waging the war against de Mella. He was gradually gaining recognition: he represented the region during conferences in Valencia and Barcelona, and in 1927 he entered the board of the Navarrese press association. Some of his articles were published beyond Navarre, be it in local right-wing Cantabrian or Catalan newspapers. López Sanz continued hailing the region; in 1925 he was awarded a prize for his work on history of Navarre; in a "literatos nuevos" rubric of a literary review voiced against "literatura cocotesco-sentimental" and idolized "glorias regionales", to create "las regiones fuertes que formen una Patria grande". In 1929 he first gained a reference of a "Gran Lopezarra". In February 1930 as an appointee he again entered the ayuntamiento and served until the April 1931 elections, unclear whether he lost or did not stand.

== Republic ==
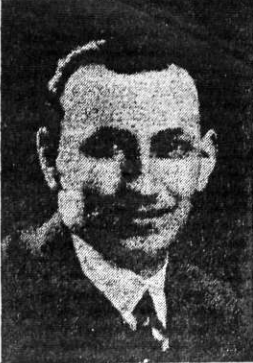
López Sanz, 1930s

Though unenthusiastic about the newly established Republic, López Sanz cheered the fall of Alfonso XIII; in El Pensamiento Navarro he declared that "monarquía constitucional no engendró virtudes de lealtad; procuró corromperías". Under the strict republican censorship he could have afforded only veiled homage references to traditionalist monarchy, camouflaged as a religious reflection. Religious motives were also vital when in 1931-1932 he supported the Estella statute against so-called Estatuto de las Gestoras; with the Estella version in force, he claimed that “podremos respirar tranquilos como católicos”. However, he also voiced against emerging Christian-Democratic groupings, blaming them - along the liberal monarchy - for ongoing secularisation of the Spanish society, and within the limits permitted by censorship ridiculed newly introduced institutions like secular marriages.

The position of López Sanz in El Pensamiento changed already in 1930, when the editor-in-chief Miguel Esparza Aguinaga was forced to resign, accused of siding with Basque nationalists; his position was assumed by Francisco Marquínez y López de Alda, barely 3 years older than López Sanz. From this moment the latter emerged among leading figures of the staff. While before he was largely engaged in anonymous editorial work, published on trivia and if penned major articles they were limited mostly to history, in the early 1930s he was increasingly frequently populating the Dialogos de hoy rubric and gained his own Rafagas column, where he discussed a variety of issues ranging from the impact of rain on daily life to unemployment. It soon turned out that Marquínez developed serious health problems and in mid-1933 was often out of work. It is not clear whether the Carlist regional executive, which controlled the ownership of El Pensamiento, considered any alternative candidates for the chief editor job; the Traditionalist credentials of López Sanz were not in doubt, as he often used to speak at local Navarrese rallies. In October 1933 he was nominated the new redactor-jefe.

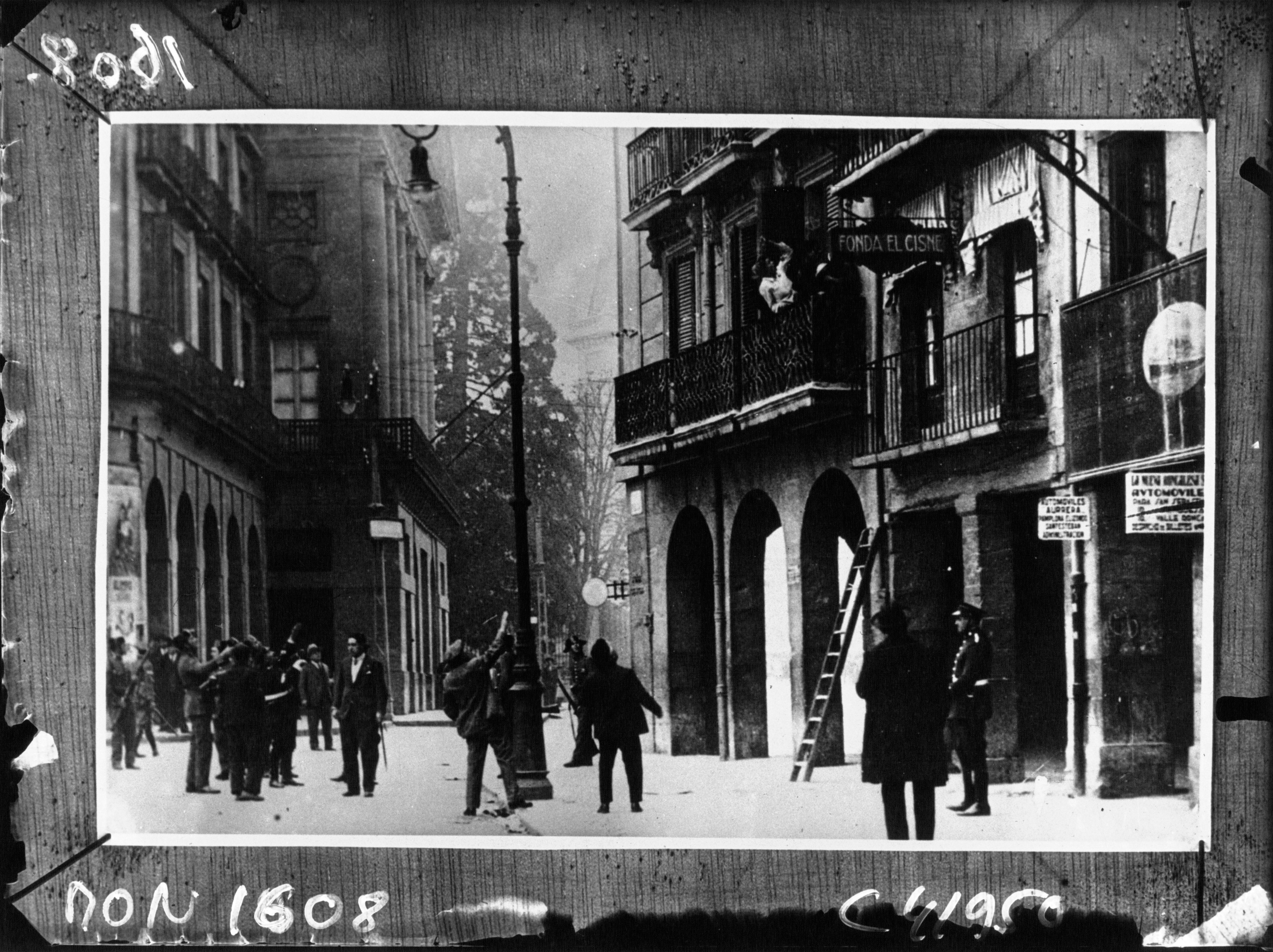
Pamplona 1932; attempt to burn down the Carlist Baleztena house

As the new chief editor López Sanz tested the limits of republican censorship, lambasting liberalism or socialism and hailing "instituciones tradicionales". He declared parliamentarian democracy over and to be replaced by "regimes fuertes" (with examples of Greece and Portugal), yet he ridiculed Primo de Rivera, "el actual caudillo del fascio español" whose ideas resembled rather "comunismo o al socialismo". However, most of his pieces - now published almost every day on the front page - were not dedicated to politics, focused rather on history or culture. In 1935 he accepted amalgamation of El Pensamiento - printed on 6 pages and with circulation of some 2,000-3,900 copies - into the centrally-coordinated Carlist press machinery and in early 1936 steered the daily during the parliamentary electoral campaign. Anticipating triumph of the right, he called for future "legislación totalmente antirrevolucionaria" implemented in alliance with CEDA and Renovación to eradicate radical left-wing political militancy. Following the victory of Popular Front, from his press column he kept warning against the advancing revolution, though he also did take part in Carlist rallies, mobilising support among the rank-and-file.

== Civil war: towards unification ==
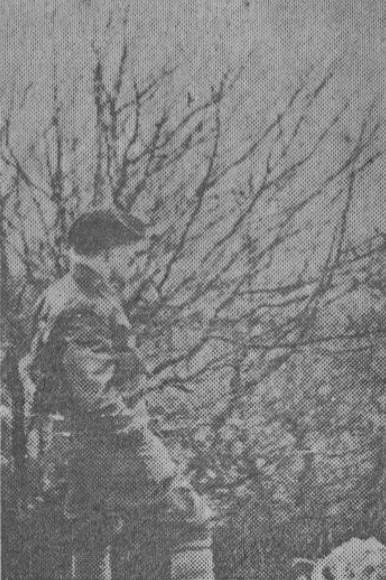
on Biscay front

None of the sources consulted mentions López Sanz as involved in anti-republican conspiracy of the spring of 1936. However, almost immediately following the rebel takeover of Navarre he was incorporated into the Carlist wartime structures. In July he got nominated as Delegado de Prensa del Requeté de Navarra and member of Delegacion de Prensa y Propaganda, a body subordinated to the Traditionalist Navarrese executive, Junta Central Carlista de Guerra de Navarra (JCCGN). In late July he played central role when orchestrating the field mass, celebrated in Plaza del Castillo. Also in late July 1936 JCCGN appointed him to its newly created dependent structure, Comisión de Expertos sobre la Reintegración Foral; its task was to work out a proposal for separate Navarrese arrangements, based on historical fueros and to be incorporated into the legal framework of the new Spain; nothing is known of any result of its labours. In September he appeared in Radio Burgos, refraining from specific Carlist overtones and hailing the Nationalist war effort. Throughout late 1936 and early 1937 López Sanz kept advancing the Carlist propaganda when managing El Pensamiento Navarro; in grandiose terms he saluted the sacrifice of new Traditionalist martyrs and called for more effort. He toured Navarre himself, speaking at various locations, though in early spring of 1937 he appeared also far away in Andalusia; in March as official representative of JCCGN's Delegacion de Prensa y Propaganda he spoke in freshly taken Málaga.

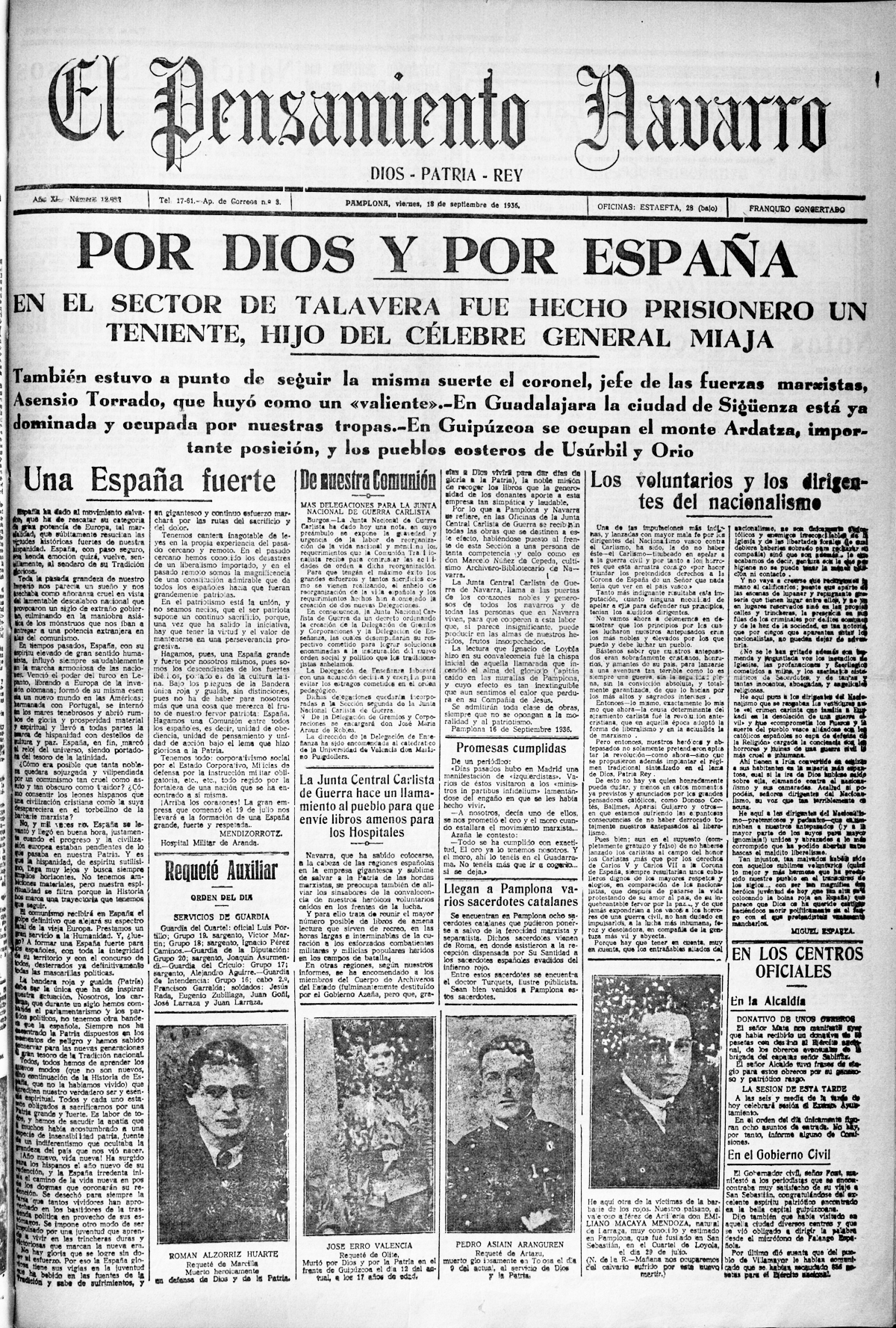
Pensamiento, Sep 1936

Having been member neither of the local Navarrese nor the national Carlist executive López Sanz did not play an active role in debates related to the threat of enforced unification; he took part in the JCCGN sitting in mid-April, yet it is not known whether - like most of the Navarrese - he tended to accept Franco's dictate. When the Unification Decree was issued he was touring the Biscay frontline, every few days sending to El Pensamiento Navarro his fresh and usually exalted correspondence. Under his guidance - though also subject to heavy-handed military censorship - the daily duly published all related legislation but also some editorials, which in moderate and somewhat Aesopian language acknowledged the amalgamation. López Sanz did not publish any enthusiastic article, yet he signed messages "reiterando su adhesión" to Franco and congratulating "invicto Caudillo". However, when the unificated Falange Española Tradicionalista was about to take over assets of both Falange and Comunión Tradicionalista, ownership of El Pensamiento Navarro was transferred to a formally commercial company, Editorial Navarra, set up especially for this purpose; the move saved the daily from incorporation into the FET press machinery and probably also saved López Sanz's job. In August he took part in another sitting of JCCGN, organized to handle amalgamation into the state party. In September and in line with unification regulations, Oficina de Prensa y Propaganda was dissolved.

== Civil war: after unification ==
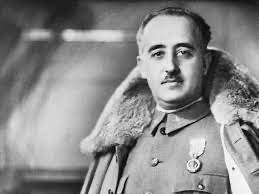
Franco, late 1930s

Unlike some Carlism-related Navarrese publicistas, in the emerging Francoist structures López Sanz did not assume any position. He is mentioned neither in historiographic works on post-unification wartime Carlism, nor on Navarrese officialdom of the late 1930s nor on the process of forging the new Falange Española Tradicionalista. The only information available is related to his work as editor-in-chief of El Pensamiento Navarro, which grew from 6 pages in 1937 to 8 pages in 1938 and its special issues might have boasted of as many as 40 pages. Editorial Navarra, the company which owned the newspaper, was in turn formally owned by leaders of Navarrese Carlism: mostly conde Rodezno, Luis Arrellano Dihinx and the Baleztena brothers. They were all good acquaintances of López Sanz, yet it is not clear whether and if yes how much he had to bend his own preferences to comply with the line required by the owners.

In general terms El Pensamiento Navarro remained perfectly within the limits of official propaganda. Franco was invariably hailed in grandiose terms as great leader while Nationalist effort was presented as patriotic sacrifice. The Republicans were referred as bestial bunch at the service of Moscow, e.g. after Guernica López Sanz blamed "ruso-separatistas" for burning the city and concluded with "¡canallas, y mil veces canallas!". He populated the front-page Relente column, which appeared in almost every issue; in this case he was signing as "SAB", while his correspondence was usually signed as "Lopezarra" and in case of important editorials he published under own surname. On the anniversary of José Antonio's death a huge necrological note was published, though not clear whether enforced by censorship. However, while always careful to pay appropriate homage to officialdom, El Pensamiento firmly held to the Carlist identity; every issue listed fallen requetés in the "martyrs" rubric, every some time Carlist kings, historical commanders and thinkers were referred as role models, and Rodezno's appointment to minister of justice was acknowledged "como compensación a aquellas luchas".

Carlist standard

At times López Sanz used Aesopian language to embark on veiled defence of separate Traditionalist identity against unification designs. Explaining while he had not applied for a FET membership card yet he declared that he did not fancy visiting a photographer's office. Referring the case of a censor having crossed out "R" on the Carlist "D.P.R."-embroided stationery he lambasted the man as a coward. Discussing unspecified friction he quoted Aparisi, who called for "unión de todos los que oían misa", but also - probably in veiled reference to closing Carlist círculos - he exclaimed "¡si en todos los pueblos españoles hubiera habido un modesto círculo carlista!" El Pensamiento was cautious when acclaiming the regent, Don Javier, who did not feature frequently on its pages. When reporting his meeting with Franco in December 1937 the prince was dedicated a large front-page photograph (a privilege usually reserved exclusively for Franco) and the two were presented as "dos ilustres personalidades"; Don Javier appeared not as a regent, but as "depositario de las esencias" of Traditionalism.

== 1940s and the Francoist question ==
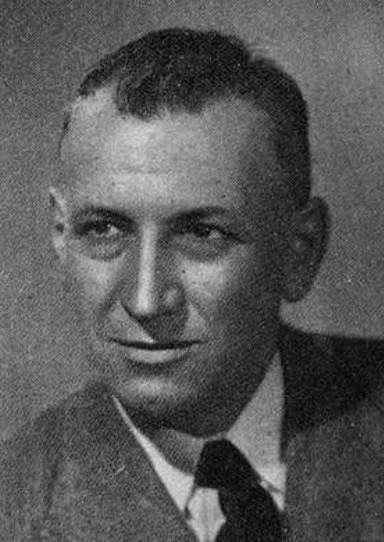
López Sanz, 1940s

The 1940s was the period of extreme fragmentation within the Navarrese Traditionalism. There were 2 lines of division; one related to Carlist position versus the regime, and another related to the dynastical question. Both lines crossed, forming a complex matrix of allegiances, and López Sanz, as manager of perhaps the most important Traditionalist daily in the country, did matter within this puzzle. As to the question of Francoism, by some scholars López Sanz is counted among the Rodezno-led Navarrese Carlist "oligarquía próxima al franquismo", perhaps not as close to the regime as e.g. Amadeo Marco or Antonio Lizarza, but much closer than e.g. the Baleztena brothers or Javier Astraín.

López Sanz was a genuine admirer of Franco and supporter of the regime, though he remained lukewarm about Falangism. At times he clashed with the Falangists, e.g. confronting Gimenez Caballero regarding the claim that Navarre should contribute to Spanish unity by forgetting its fueros; his article was blocked by censorship, and so was a planned series of booklets on requetés, the first one to be written by López Sanz himself. However, he accepted the 1940 appointment to the Pamplona town hall, which commenced his third string in the ayuntamiento. The acceptance put the Carlist leader Manuel Fal Conde in difficult position, as the latter opted for non-collaboration; eventually he concluded he could have not afforded not to consent. The term was again shorter than planned; following the so-called Begoña Incident of 1942, when Falangists threw grenades into a Carlist gathering, all Carlist concejales resigned from the ayuntamiento.

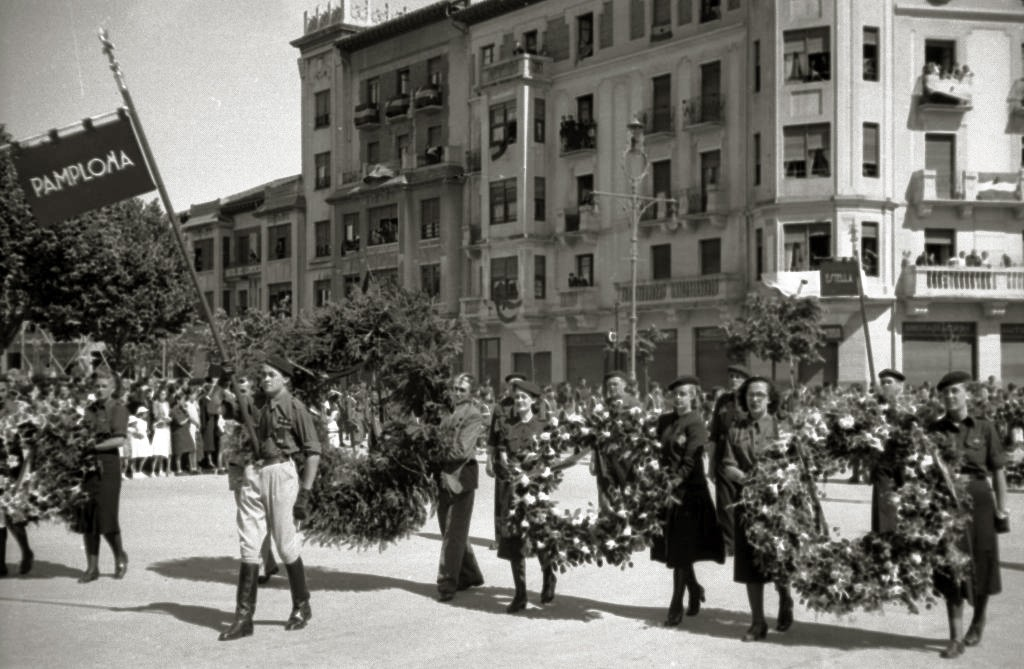
Pamplona, early Francoism

López Sanz later claimed that "El Pensamiento Navarro was the only Spanish daily allowed to stand against the Axis" and that he was forced to publish Vázquez de Mella's pro-German addresses from the First World War. However, since the late 1930s the daily remained perfectly attuned with the overall line promoted by the press office. It consistently published pieces which sounded sympathetic towards Fascist Italy and Nazi Germany, be it in 1940, when ridiculing French anti-Petain exiles in Britain or in 1945, when re-printing literally Nazi news about "muerte heroica" of Hitler or "indescribable resistance" of German troops in Berlin.

In 1947, when the regime introduced Ley de Sucesión, López Sanz remained cautiously approbative. He admonished Carlist critics that Franco must not be approached "como si fuese un adversario". He also underlined that "Franco significa la esperanza de la monarquía, pero no de una monarquía ligera, sino de la monarquía tradicional" which embodies the spirit of the Cruzada; he presented fidelity to "espíritu del 18 de Julio" as one of theoretical Carlist dynastical cornerstones. Again, support for Franco did not translate to support for the administration. During the first local elections, staged by the regime in 1948, López Sanz favoured candidates running against these promoted by the civil governor Juan Junquera. In 1950, following a long of conflict of gobernador versus ayuntamiento and Diputación Provincial, he congratulated the town hall on their stance when defending Carlist círculos against administrative designs to close them.

== 1940s and the dynastical question ==
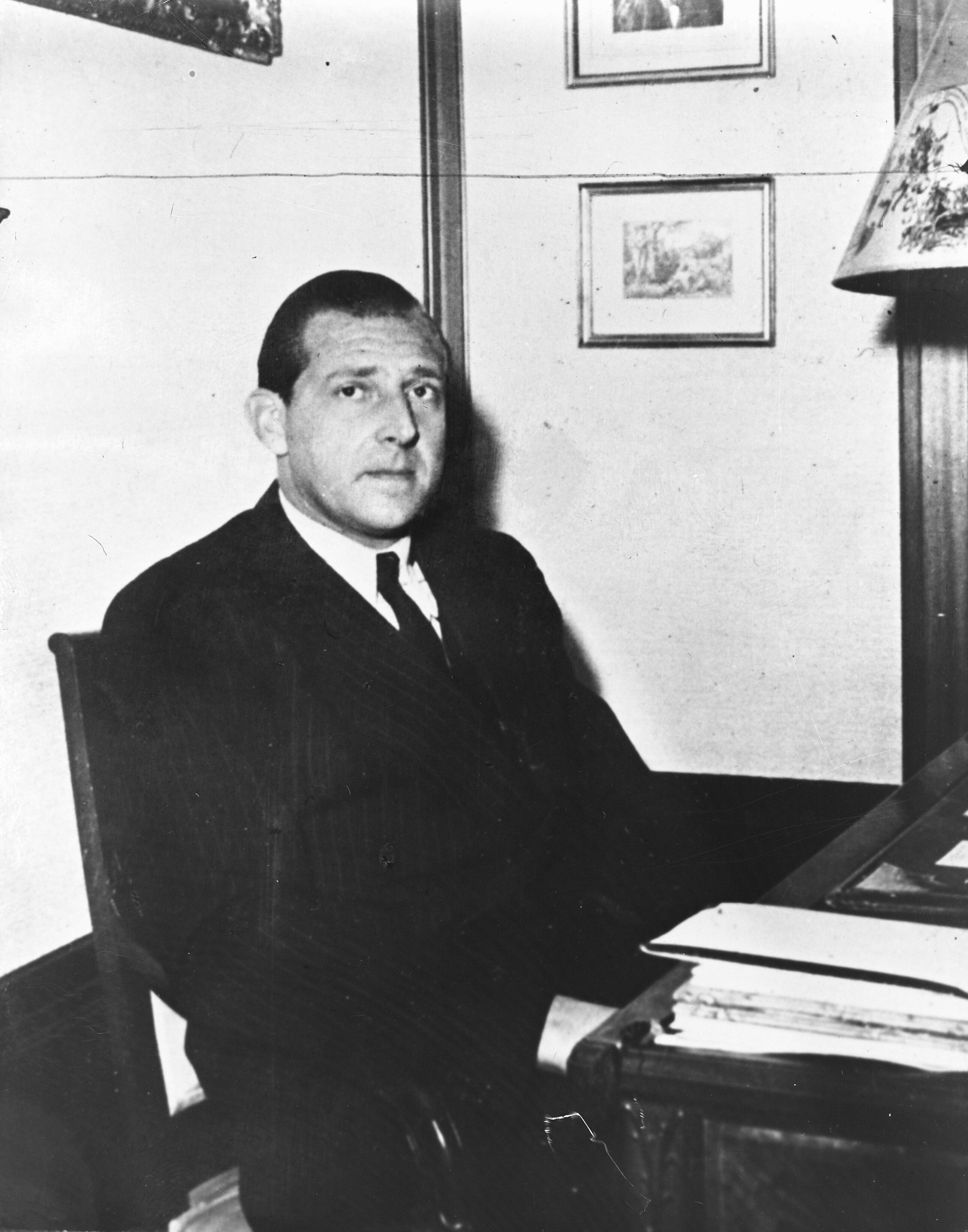
Don Juan, 1940s

In the very early 1940s López Sanz remained perfectly within the limits of Carlist dynastical orthodoxy: he stayed loyal to the regent Don Javier and did not advance any own candidate to the crown. Though not member of regional executive, he was kept on the loop and in 1941 on suggestion of Zamanillo was included "en representación de la comisión de propaganda" in the newly appointed Junta Regional. However, as years were passing by he was increasingly uneasy about what many perceived as an overdue regency. In 1943 Jesús Elizalde became fairly vocal when asking that a grand Carlist assembly to decide upon a new king be convened. When Fal responded with an angry letter, in 1944 the Navarrese Junta Regional resigned in corpore, though its members would informally keep meeting, also in the house of López Sanz. Rather adverse towards Don Carlos Pio and the Carlist faction known as Carloctavismo but also lukewarm towards Don Javier, López Sanz was very cautiously leaning towards exploring the perspectives of reaching an understanding with Don Juan. In 1946 and together with numerous Navarrese heavyweights - including Rodezno, Joaquín Baleztena, Ignacio Baleztena, Martínez Berasain, José Angel Zubiaur, Jesús Larrainzar, Jesús Elizalde, Morentin de Morentín, Esteban Ezcurra, Luis Arellano - he signed a letter to Don Javier, in polite yet bold terms asking him to sort out the royal issue. However, when the same year Rodezno asked López Sanz to accompany him on a visit to Don Juan in Portugal, Lopezarra refused.

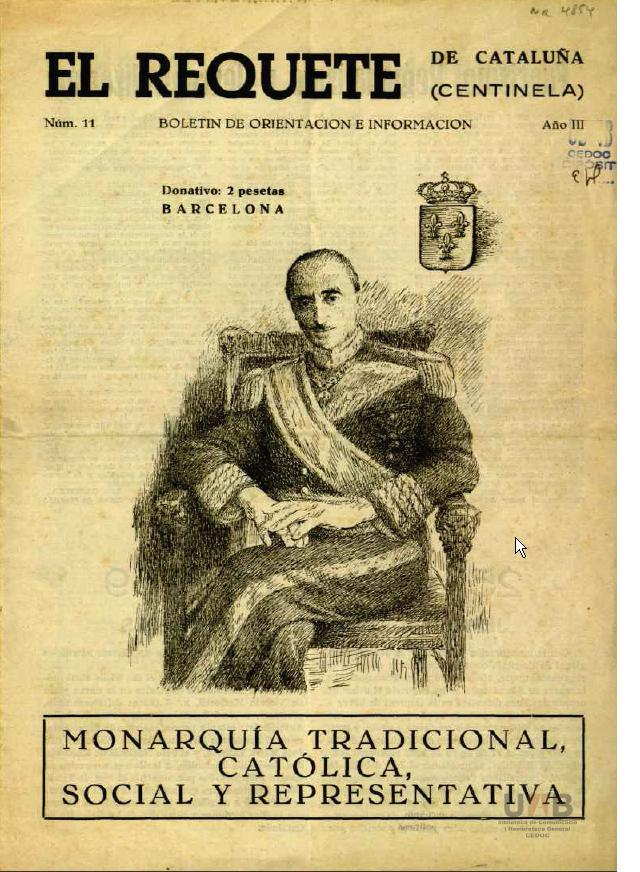
Don Javier, 1950s

In 1947 it was 50 years since El Pensamiento Navarro appeared on the market; the large commemorative issue celebrated Carlist history, yet what struck many readers was total lack of any references either to Don Javier or Fal. Many sent their angry letters, and some suggested to Fal that the daily be disauthorised as Carlist periodical. To some it smacked of sinister neutrality as "numerous divisions within the Navarrese branch of the party inspired the director to believe that the only way to keep the daily afloat is to keep it distant from all factions", to others it implicitly favoured the Don Juan and demonstrated "proclividad juanista". In private López Sanz was indeed endorsing Don Juan and considered Don Javier a Frenchman who "no podía representar dignamente la Jefatura máxima del carlismo español". He also defended Rodezno sounding Don Juan as perfectly within limits allowed by the regency. His personal engagement sort of climaxed in 1948, during angry exchange of open letters with Melchor Ferrer. The latter charged him with breaching the Carlist discipline and loyalty, though he pointed also - perhaps rightly - that López Sanz was leaning towards Don Juan merely "out of resignation". The El Pensamiento usual column, titled Glosa and filled by López Sanz, where he commented all sort of issues, at the turn of the 1940s and the 1950s was reportedly getting mocked in Pamplona because of its veiled pro-Juanista stand. Increasingly irritated, López Sanz observed that some "preferred communism rather than Don Juan.

== Mid-Francoism ==
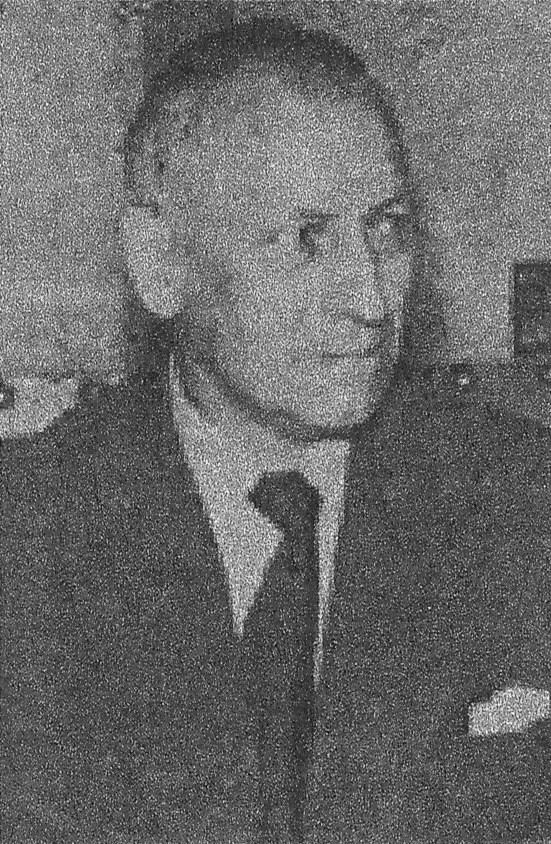
López Sanz, 1950s

In the early 1950s many Carlists, especially these from the generation of 20-year-olds, viewed El Pensamiento Navarro as basically a propaganda platform of the Estorilos, which indirectly yet clearly endorsed Don Juan and maintained blackout on Don Javier. One author claims that "with the 1952 death of Rodezno López Sanz abandoned Don Juan and moved to the camp of Don Javier of Borbón-Parma", though in the mid-1950s the only change visible was that he began to be somewhat celebrated by the officialdom, in 1954 having received Orden de Isabel la Catolica and becoming president of the Navarrese press association, while in 1956 he entered the jury of Premio Nacional de Periodismo. The dynastical turnaround came somewhat later, during the Montejurra ascent of 1957, the romería that López Sanz co-initiated to honour the Carlist fallen in 1939. In 1957 a group of young activists carefully staged an unexpected appearance of prince Hugues, the son of Don Javier; his address might have sounded like an offer to Franco. Unlike during earlier ascents, acknowledged only by small notes, this time López Sanz and El Pensamiento reported the event in "tono heroico, pomposo" in a 2-page editorial.

Those adverse towards Don Javier and the Borbón-Parmas staged a counter-action. Some 50-odd Carlists, including numerous politicians of prestigious standing, visited Don Juan in Estoril; during a solemn ceremony he declared allegiance to Traditionalist principles and was acknowledged as the Carlist dynastical leader. López Sanz did not take part, but could not have avoided taking a stand. The question whether this declaration should be published in El Pensamiento divided not only the editorial board, but also owners of Editorial Navarra; Arellano pushed for it, Joaquín Baleztena (who since 1951 again presided the regional junta) and his brother Ignacio opposed it, while Martínez Berasaín remained ambiguous. López Sanz spoke out against publication; when outvoted, he offered his resignation. Eventually the issue became pointless, as censorship banned the publication anyway.

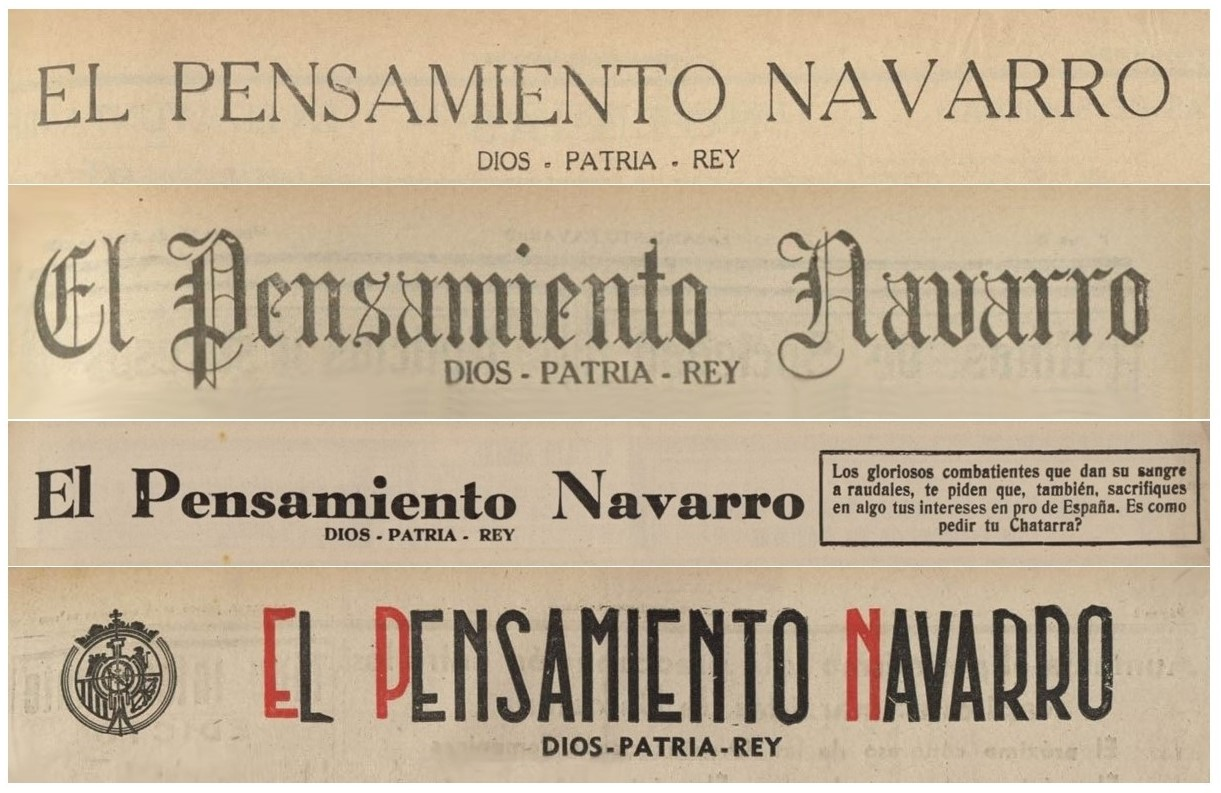
mastheads of El Pensamiento Navarro

Carlism of the late 1950s was marked by a decisive turn of policy towards the regime; Fal Conde left, political leadership was assumed by José María Valiente, and the movement adopted an increasingly collaborative attitude. In Navarre in 1958 Joaquín Baleztena resigned and was replaced by Francisco Javier Astráin Baquedano; López Sanz continued to lead El Pensamiento Navarro and apparently did welcome the new policy; also in 1958 he celebrated his "bodas de plata" of 25 years behind the steering wheel of the newspaper and started to give lectures in periodismo. The rapprochement between Carlism and the regime produced new honours for Lopezarra, as in 1960 he received Orden de Cisneros. During formation of the new Cortes in 1961 the regime followed all personal suggestions of Valiente; technically López Sanz was formally elected to Consejo Nacional of the Movimiento from the pool reserved for provincial delegates; this in turn automatically secured his seat in the quasi-parliament. Further honours followed: in 1962 he received Premio Nacional de Periodismo Francisco Franco, which triggered subsequent homages.

== Last years at El Pensamiento Navarro ==
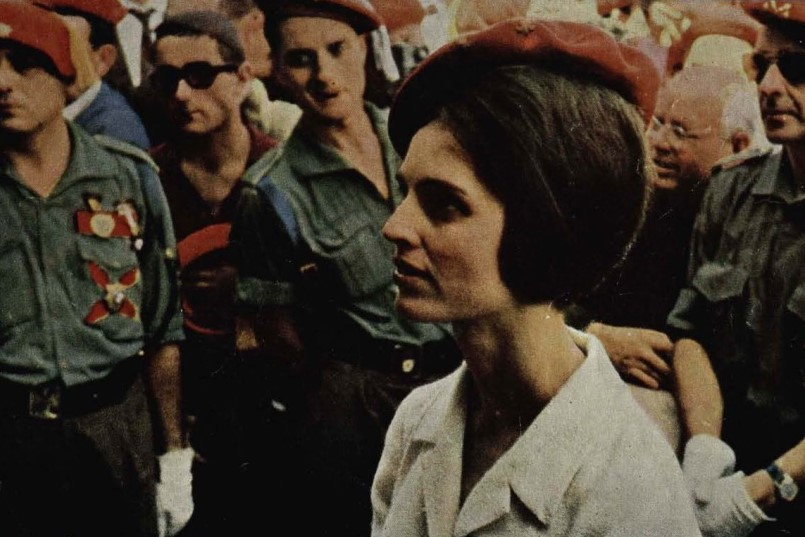
princess Maria Teresa, mid-1960s

In the early 1960s López Sanz seemed to have abandoned his Juanista leaning; instead, he demonstrated more and more sympathy for the Borbón-Parmas. A Huguista insider described it later as "un curioso fenómeno" and noted that since 1963, when Lopezarra met and entertained princess Maria Teresa de Borbón-Parma in Pamplona, he became her passionate follower, e.g. launching vehement press tirades against these who denied her the title of "infanta". Unlike many older-generation Carlists, lukewarm about prince Hugues now styled as Carlos Hugo, Lopezarra cheered his 1964 marriage with princess Irene of the Netherlands. His full U-turn was later marked by an article, in which he compared Montejurra, the symbol of loyalty, with Estoril - the symbol of treason.

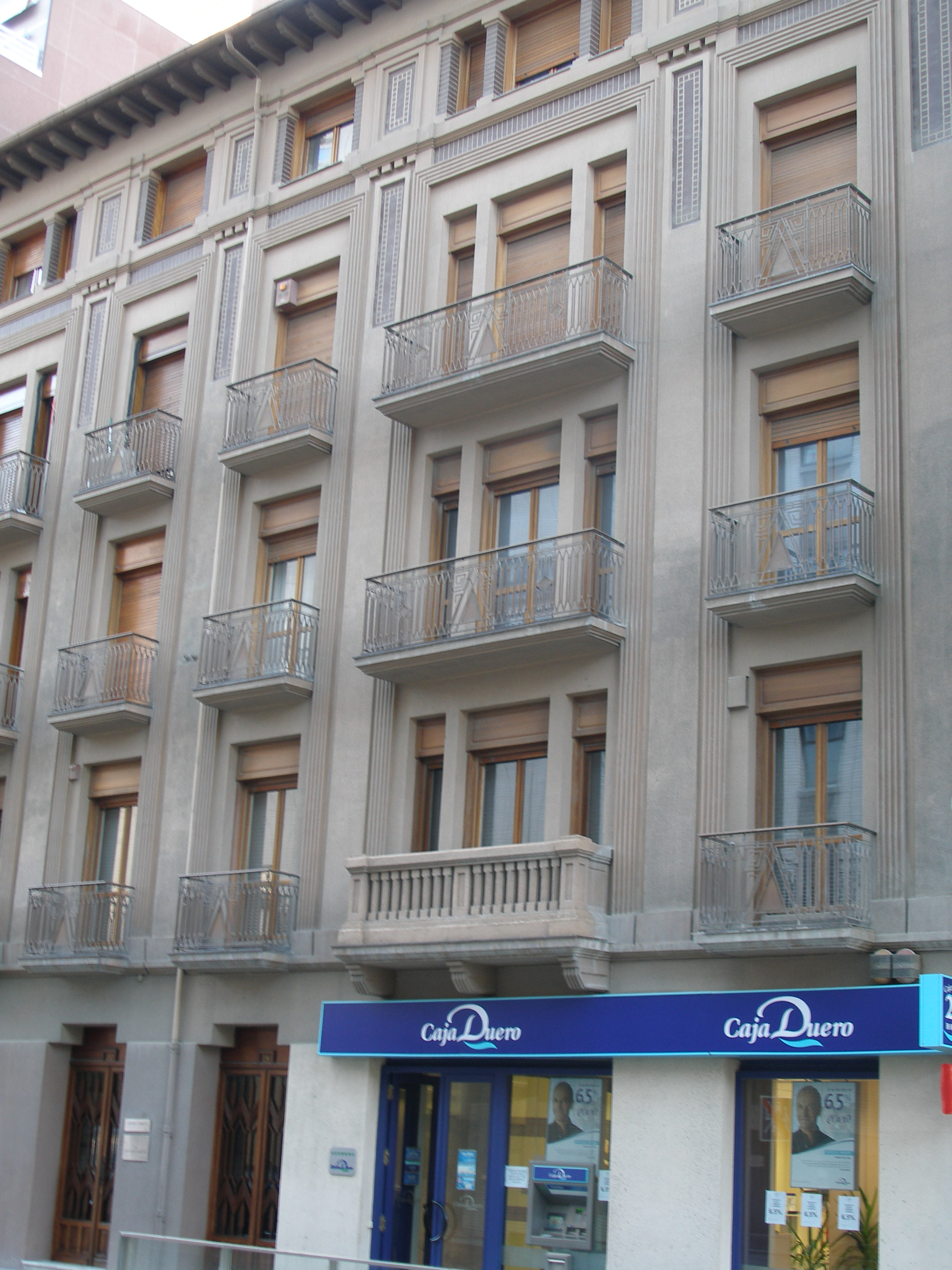
El Pensamiento office

In the mid-1960s Lopezarra engaged in polemics with the former Carlist historian, Román Oyarzun. The latter declared Carlism dead with death of Alfonso Carlos back in 1936, and in the 1960s he played down the annual Montejurra ascent as ridiculous attempts to galvanize a corpse. In 1965 López Sanz for the first time published in the Huguista-controlled periodical Montejurra and accosted Oyarzun, who in turn responded in Autocrítica y crítica de los críticos, an epilogue to another edition of his book on history of Carlism. Also other theoretical articles, published by López Sanz until the mid-1960s, acquired a somewhat new tone; previously a sworn enemy of ideological novelties, he started to pen articles like La Tradición, sintesis del progreso de todos los tiempos, perfectly in line with the Huguista narrative which advanced the theory that progress is embodied in tradition.

However, López Sanz's position towards the regime did not change. In 1964 his term in the Cortes expired; he was re-appointed to X Consejo Nacional of the Movimiento, though this time not from provincial pool but from a somewhat more prestigious pool of personal Franco’s nominees, "consejeros de libre designación". Like in 1961, it automatically translated into another term in the Cortes. The same year he was awarded a new honour, Gran Cruz del Mérito Civil. Less and less active as editor, he nevertheless stuck to his guns when it comes to history, be it Republic or the Civil War. He first lambasted Un millón de muertos, a somewhat unorthodox novel in which José Maria Gironella treated Republican combatants with some comprehension, and then fought back with a separate, anti-Gironella brochure. For the Pamplonese youth he represented the guerracivilista narrative and blind faith in Franco. In 1965 students attacked El Pensamiento premises with stones and tomatoes, protesting against what they claimed was a biased account from an earlier protest rally.

== Retirement ==
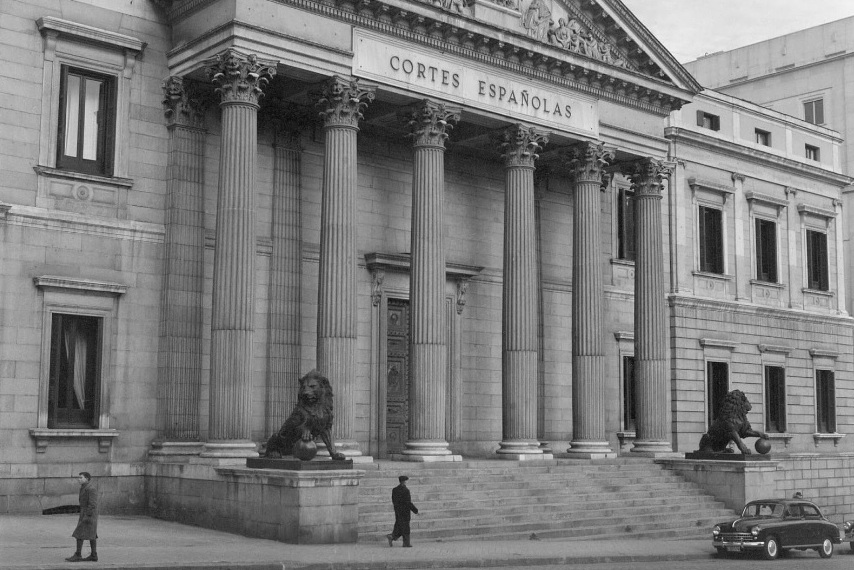
Cortes building, Francoist era

In the mid-1960s López Sanz was decreasingly frequently contributing to El Pensamiento Navarro. His 1965 New Year message was still firmly anchored in Traditionalism, yet the 1966 New Year message was already melancholic and dedicated to religious reflection. It proved to be his last one. In 1966 and following 33 years behind the steering wheel of El Pensamiento, the 70-year-old left the post; it is not clear whether he resigned or was talked into resignation, even though he was on excellent terms with equally elderly board of Editorial Navarra. As in 1967 his second term in the Cortes expired and he was not re-appointed, he became a retiree with no public assignments. The same year the nationwide press association conferred upon him the title of "Periodista de Honor".

The years of 1967-1968 mark López Sanz's closer collaboration with the Huguista review Montejurra; in total he contributed 16 articles and proved to be one of key contributors. Though some dwelled on glorious episodes from Carlist history, most were organized along the dynastical thread, e.g. endorsing Portuguese legitimism and discussing its Spanish impact, or denouncing non-functionality of liberal monarchy and the related Alfonsist line. On the other hand, he exalted the requeté tradition and its alleged continuity, the Montejurra ascents. The editorial board referred to him as "asiduo colaborador", cheered his honours and underlined his presence during any events related to the Borbón-Parmas, like the 1968 visit of María Teresa and María Nieves in the sanctuary of Valladolid. Though some scholars claim that Montejurra was "mosaico de opiniones", there is little doubt that the Huguistas, now firmly set on an anti-Traditionalist course, treated López Sanz instrumentally to enhance their Carlist credentials.

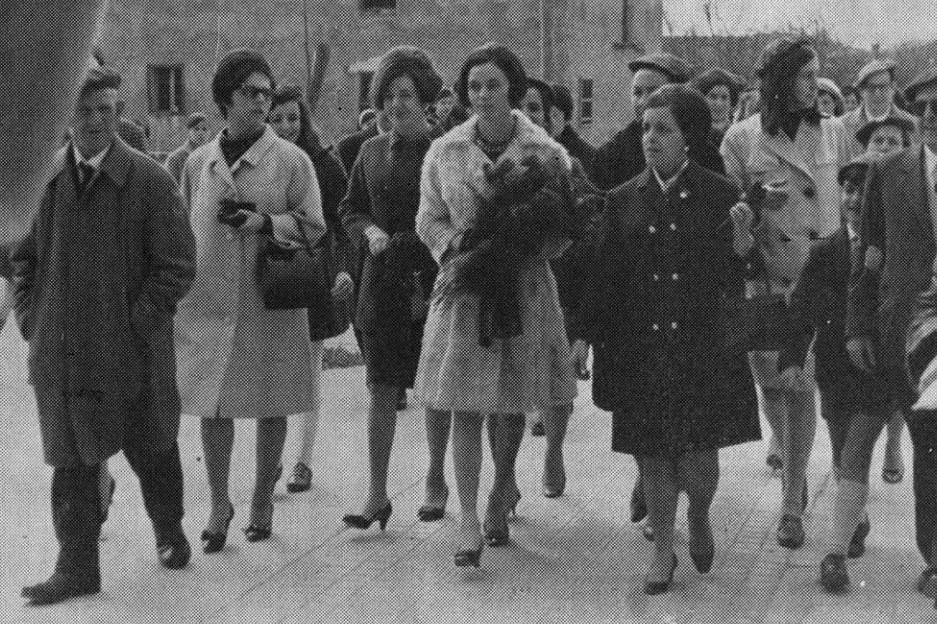
with princesses Borbón-Parma, Gran Promesa sanctuary, Valladolid 1968

It is not clear whether at any point López Sanz realised he was being manipulated; after 1968 he no longer published in Montejurra and was not involved in later Partido Carlista, though this might have been due to stigmatization of all El Pensamiento people by the Huguistas. If somewhat disoriented, he was so rather in relation to the final turn of the Francoist regime and the 1969 ascendance of Don Juan Carlos to the future king of Spain. In a private letter to Fal Lopezarra voiced his disgust, also towards supporter of this course and his former colleague, Zamanillo, which did not prevent him from publishing his contribution in a 1971 anthology of homage articles dedicated to Franco. In 1972, when "political associations" were being introduced, he appeared at meetings of Fuerza Nueva of Blas Piñar, though there is no evidence he joined it and there is no information of public activity of the septuagenarian during very last years of the regime. In 1971, when his successor Javier Pascual was sacked, López Sanz reportedly contributed few more pieces to El Pensamiento. His last appointment came already during transición: in 1976 he entered Consejo Nacional de Prensa, nominated from the pool of ministerial appointments.

== Beyond El Pensamiento Navarro ==
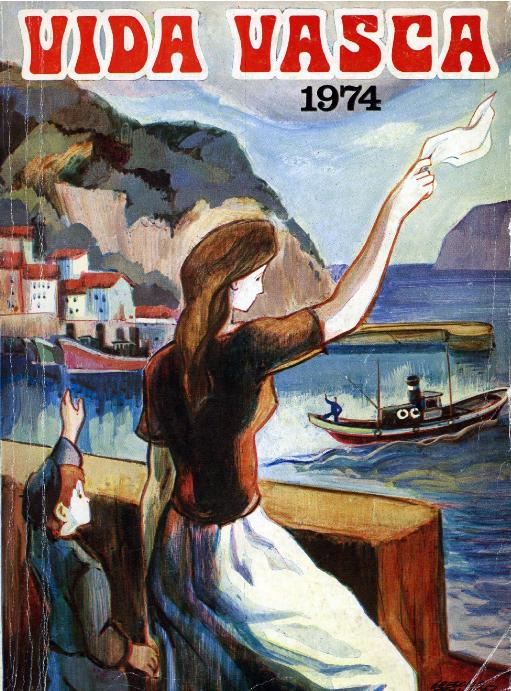
Vida vasca

Though he became the face of El Pensamiento and remained associated with the Pamplonese daily for 50 years (1916-1966), he was also either briefly or vaguely related to numerous other titles: El Obrero Sindicalista (which he directed in the early 1910s), Trinchera, Rádica (which he co-ran), regional papers where he rarely published in the 1930s (El Eco de Gerona, Heraldo de Almería, El Cantábrico), a Basque review Euskalerriaren Alde, specialised intellectual periodicals (Letras Regionales, Tradición), Carlist titles El Cruzado Español (in the 1930s) and Boinas Rojas (Málaga, in the 1940s), post-war syndicalist La Tierra, rarely La Voz de Navarra, specialised titles Pregón and Vida Vasca, in the 1950s the semi-official Gaceta de la prensa española and briefly but frequently Montejurra (in the mid-1960s). However, the one which stands out is local Navarrese edition of Hoja de Lunes, a corporate press newspaper issued on Mondays, when most titles did not appear. There are sources which claim he was a long-time director of this publication, yet it is not clear when, possibly after he retired from El Pensamiento. The pen-names he used were mostly "Lopezarra" and "SAB", though also "Agustín de Azcona", "A. de Azcona", "F.L.S.", "Montejurra", "Juan de Albret", and "Sapo".

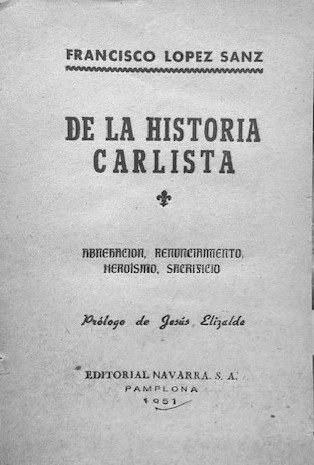
De la historia carlista

The stand-alone volumes he published were usually pamphlets of brochures, almost all published as "Francisco López Sanz". The first one was a set of recollections from the 1921-1922 Morocco wartime service, titled Bajo el sol africano. Recuerdos de Marruecos (1926). The Navarrese contribution to Nationalist triumph in the war was acknowledged in a work categorized by scholars as "de corte político-propagandístico", namely Navarra en el Alzamiento Nacional (1939); in the second somewhat revised edition it was re-titled as Navarra en la Cruzada. Episodios, gestos, lenguaje epistolar y anecdotario (1948). Two volumes of selected articles from El Pensamiento Navarro were published as Relente in 1942 and 1947. A loose and rather non-systematic attempt at overall Carlist history, constructed as a series of selected episodes, was embodied in De la historia carlista: abnegación, renunciamiento, heroísmo, sacrificio (1951). An anti-Gironella pamphlet was ¿Un millón de muertos? ¡Pero con héroes y mártires! (1963). The only novel López Sanz wrote, ¡Llevaban su sangre! (1966), became perhaps the most-frequently referred of his works, in history of literature mostly derisively and as an example of die-hard intransigent Nationalist narrative, written 25 years after the Civil War. The last volume, Carlos VII: el rey de los caballeros y el caballero de los reyes (1969), was intended to counter "el odio y la calumnia, celebrando esponsales con la ignorancia, se han juntado para arrojar ira y lodo a esa noble figura del destierro que es Carlos VII".

== Reception ==
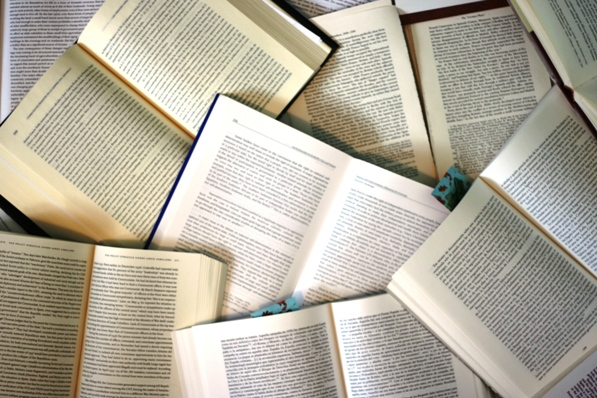

In the article "Panorama del cuento literario navarro en el siglo XX", the author Carlos Mata Induráin (1999) counted López Sanz among "las principales firmas de entre los literatos navarros de esas décadas"; he meant early- and mid-Francoism and editorial works rather than literature as such. Today he is viewed as one of key figures - if not in fact the most important and “paradigmatic” personality, "perhaps its finest Navarrese exponent"- responsible for the image of heroic Navarre, the region always faithful to its tradition and history, which in turn translated to fervent Catholicism, passionate Navarrese and Spanish patriotism, cultivating family values and, last but not least, Carlism. Almost all contemporary scholars refer this position without slightest sympathy, in best case scenario as utopian, but usually as doctrinaire and revanchist, up the point of charging the author of spreading "la retórica del odio", supporting dictatorship and implicating him in terror and repression.

The key thread in his writings is tradition, present throughout the ages and uniting the past, the present and the future. It might appear as "consanguineal continuity, this ideological steadfastness within the same families ", as religious constancy, as metaphorical fire, as same naming conventions repeated over time or as patterns of behaviour, reproduced across generations. Another fundamental ingredient is Manichean perspective, with exaltation of the "ours", disparagement of the "others", and no room for any in-between area. This is applied mostly to the Civil War, with requetés "unworldly almost to the point of questioning their masculinity" and Republicans as heirs to 19th-century liberals, de-humanized and presented as "bestias epilépticas". Though the fundament of all his writings, currently these features are seldom explored against his journalistic labours; they are rather highlighted in relation to ¡Llevaban su sangre!, the book often presented as curiosity: "representa lo más retrógrado en la mentalidad de los ex-'cruzados'". When consumer society of Spain was already looking towards the post-Francoist era, the novel resurrected the narrative and logic from 30 years ago.

There is relatively little written about López Sanz as editor-in-chief of El Pensamiento Navarro, with close to no attempt to evaluate his performance as chief editor, contributor, leader of a large team or finance manager. Some authors classify the daily of the mid-1960s as an antiquated newspaper badly in need of technological overhaul. Its circulation at the time was some 12,500 copies, a decent performance for a 110,000-inhabitants city. Most commentators extend to El Pensamiento the damning judgement offered with regard to López Sanz's books, yet one notes "la ambigüedad de postura del director de El Pensamiento Navarro"; the ambiguity in question is related to the task of reconciling his Integrist outlook and necessities of daily life. Another commentator, who also eschewed stigmatization, underlined that he managed the daily under heavy-handed regime and navigated between "problemas con la censura o, si bien, el ejercicio de una estudiada autocensura", while his pen has always been "incisiva, culta, bien documentada historicamente". So far, López Sanz has not gained a single monongaphic work and at best his brief biograms or dedicated paragraphs might be found in single books.

== See also ==
- Carlism
- Traditionalism (Spain)
- El Pensamiento Navarro
