= Joaquín Baleztena Azcárate =

Spanish politician

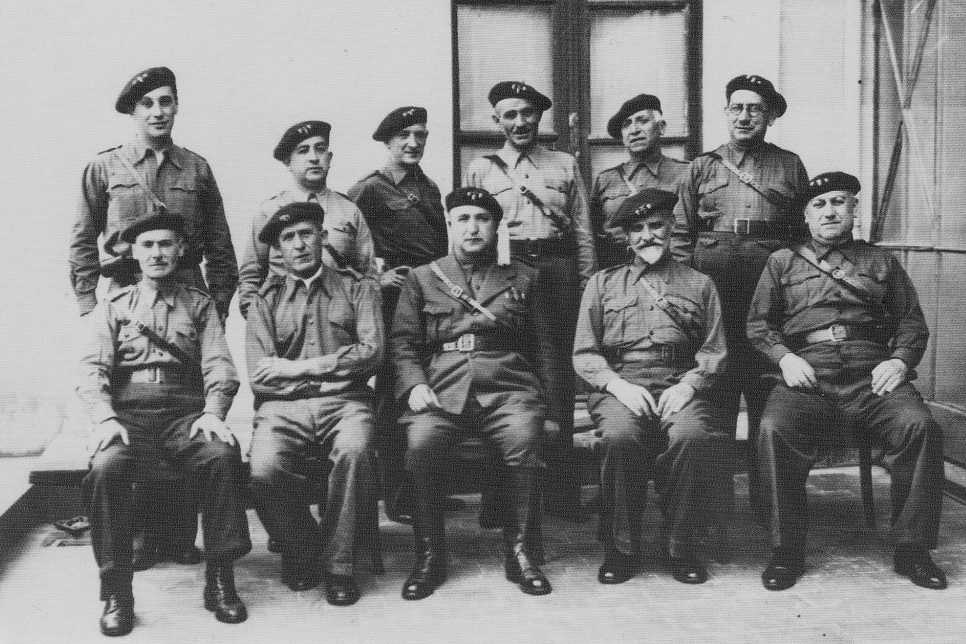
- Born: Joaquín Baleztena Ascárate; 1883; Pamplona, Spain
- Died: 1978 (aged 94–95); Pamplona, Spain
- Occupation: lawyer
- Known for: politician
- Political party: Comunión Tradicionalista

Joaquín Baleztena Azcárate (25 February 1883 – 26 June 1978) was a Spanish Carlist politician. During three consecutive terms between 1919 and 1923 he served as a Traditionalist member of the Cortes. In two separate strings of 1931–1942 and 1951–1957 he headed the regional party organization in Navarre; he remained one of key nationwide Carlist politicians from the late 1910s till the early 1970s. In 1937–1939 he was a member of the Falange Española Tradicionalista y de las JONS executive, Consejo Nacional.

== Family and youth ==
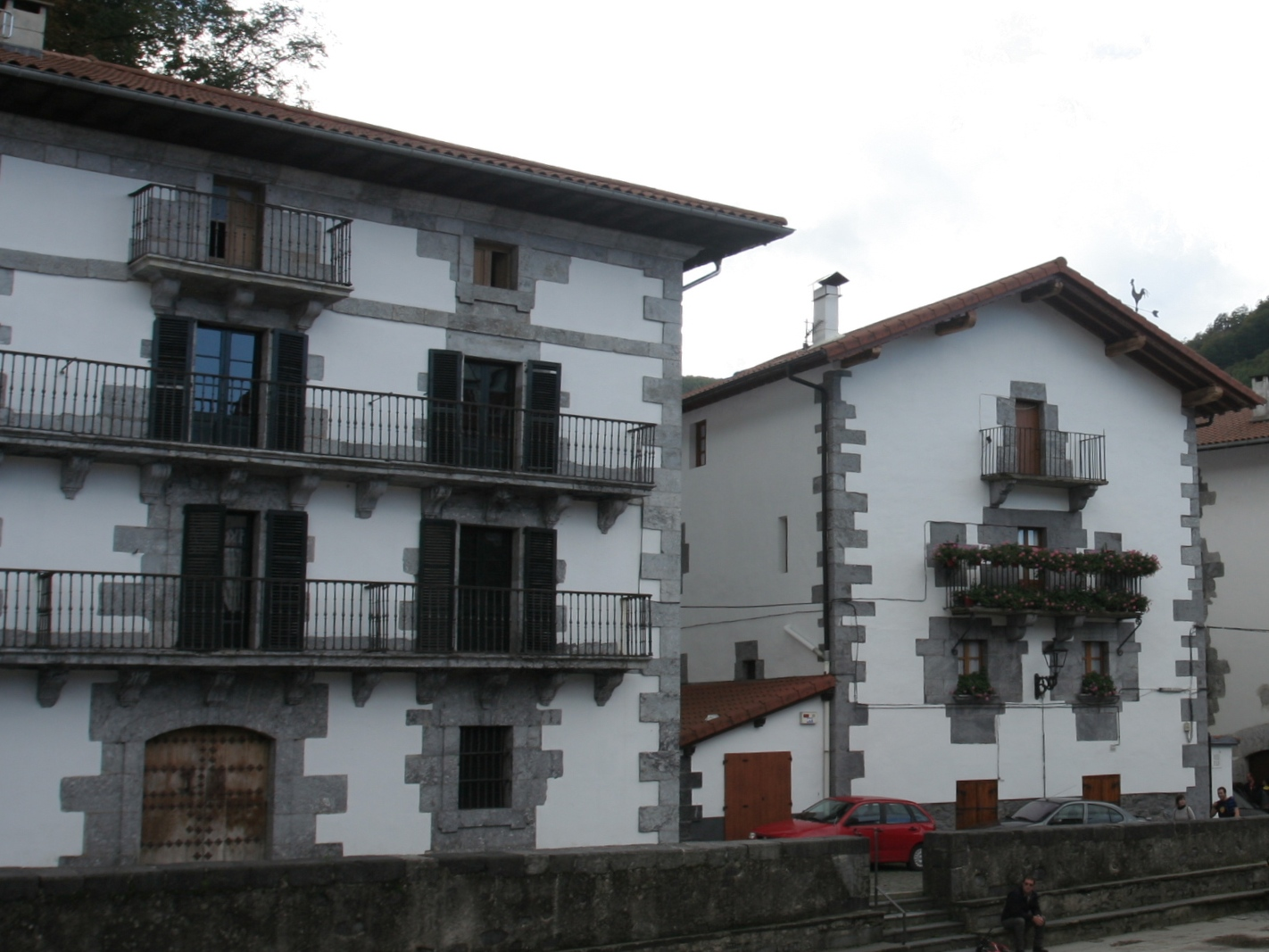
Baleztena houses, Leitza

Joaquín's paternal grandfather, José Joaquín Baleztena Echeverría, a native of Navarrese Leitza and an ethnic Basque, was an indiano. He tried his luck in California and Cuba before returning to the home town, where he owned two buildings next to ayuntamiento. His son and Joaquín's father, also an ethnic Basque, Joaquín Baleztena Muñagorri, formed part of new Navarrese economic and political elites. Holding a number of rural properties in the comarca of Valles Merdionales, he was co-founder of Conducción de Aguas de Arteta and shareholder of a number of other local companies. Elected consejal of Pamplona in the 1880s and 1890s, he served as vice-president of the local Circulo Carlista. Joaquín's mother, María Dolores Ascárate Echeverría, was also descendant to a Carlist family; her father served as officer under Carlos V during the First Carlist War.

Joaquín was born as the second of 9 children and the oldest of 3 brothers. Like all his siblings, he was raised in the fervently Catholic atmosphere flavored by strong Carlist political sympathies. His older sister, María Isabel, was initially supposed to marry the Traditionalist ideologue Juan Vázquez de Mella. His younger brother and lifetime political partner, Ignacio, became an iconic Pamplona figure, expert and the moving spirit behind numerous provincial feasts, promoter of Basque folk culture and a politician himself. His younger sister Dolores was a Carlist activist, who – apart from having been longtime chauffeur of Joaquín – made her name as organizer and author. His younger brother, Pedro María Baleztena Ascarate, became a nationally recognized pelota champion. His paternal cousins, the Arraiza Baleztena brothers, sympathized with Carlism and held different posts in the Pamplona ayuntamiento in the early 20th century. Some of his Baleztena Abarrategui nephews became public figures. Joaquín (Joaquíncho) was active in the board of El Pensamiento Navarro; Javier was director of Archivo General de Navarra and is author of historical and historiographical works related to the province, while Cruz Maria directed B-class movies. Most of the family remained Carlist, some of them engaged in politics. Joaquín remained head of the family since the death of his father in 1917 until his own decease.

In literature Joaquín Baleztena is often referred to as "abogado", though none of the sources consulted offers any information on what, where and when he studied.

== Restoration ==
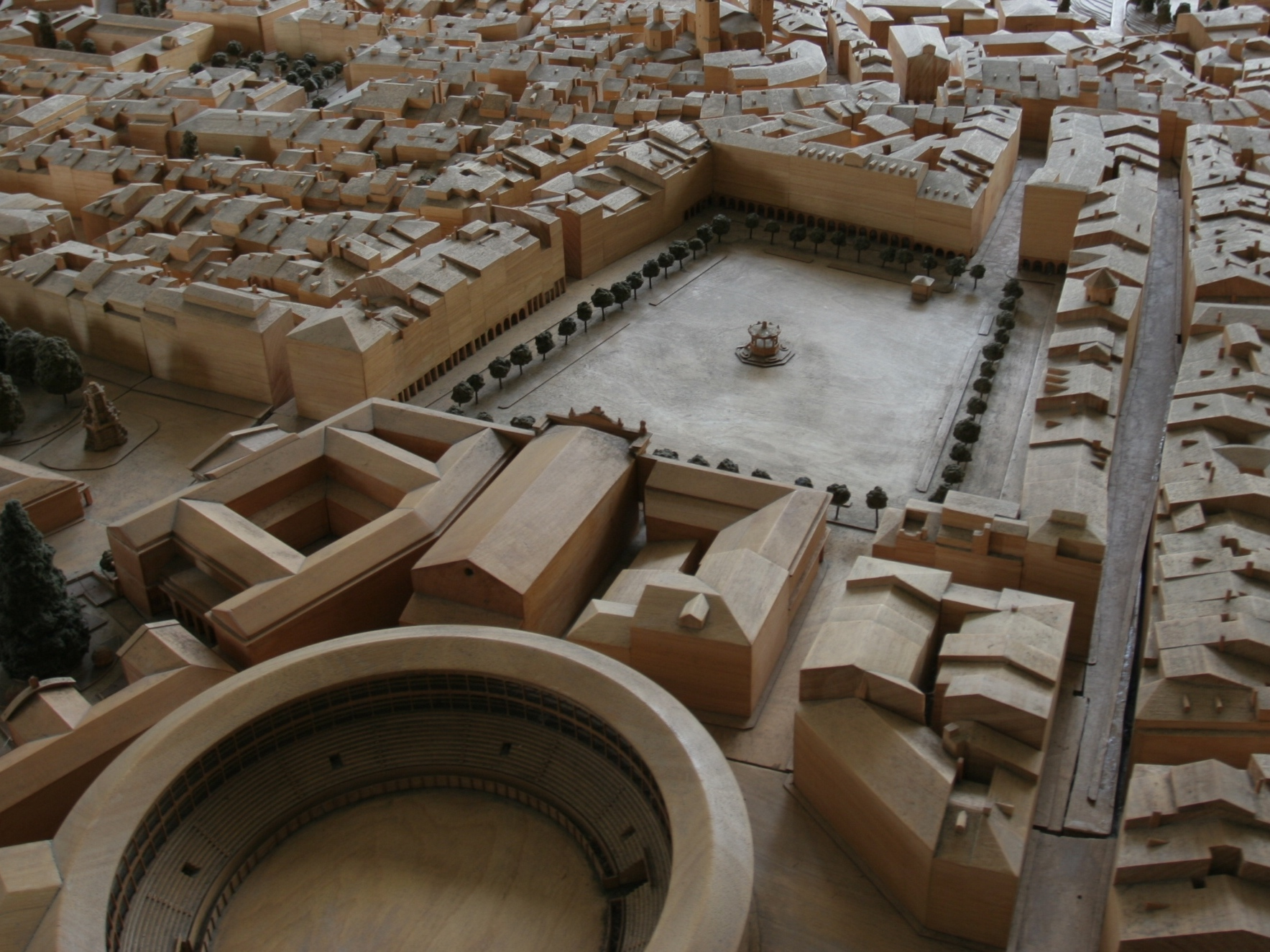
Pamplona, early 20th century

Joaquín commenced his public career when Navarrese Carlism recovered from post-war crisis and came to dominate the provincial politics. Following the example of paternal Arraiza cousins, Baleztena commenced his public career in local municipal elections and was successfully voted a Carlist concejal to the Pamplona ayuntamiento in the first decade of the 20th century, re-elected also afterwards, at least in 1913. About the same time, also influenced by his kinsfolk, he got engaged in Sociedad Protectora "La Conciliación", one of the first Catholic trade unions in Navarre, and became active in its Junta Directiva.

When growing controversy between Vazquez de Mella and the Carlist claimant exploded into a full-scale crisis, Baleztena sided with Don Jaime. As the Mellist secession of 1919 shattered the movement by defections of many recognized leaders, he remained loyal to the Carlist king. Since Victor Pradera, who previously represented the party in Cortes, joined the secessionists, in the 1919 campaign Baleztena took his place in the Pamplona district and was successfully voted into the parliament. The following year he again accessed the Carlist-Basque-conservative alliance; in Pamplona its candidates were not even challenged and he was declared victorious according to the famous Article 29. During the last campaign of the Restauración in 1923 the claimant ordered party abstention in "farsa parlamentaria", though he permitted individuals to compete on their own. Baleztena decided to run and was successful. In early 1920s both Baleztena brothers worked for rapprochement between the Carlists and PNV, hoping to reinforce traditionally-minded Basques against the nationalists. The result was Alianza Foral coalition, constructed to defend and promote traditional vasco-navarrese legal establishments. It produced fairly successful co-operation especially during provincial elections, though it also caused controversies within Navarrese Carlism. The Baleztenas continued with their vasco-navarrese strategy also by means of cultural mobilization; in 1922 they joined Comisión para la Restauración de Monumentos de Navarra, accused by Traditionalist pundits of fostering separatism.

== Dictadura and dictablanda ==
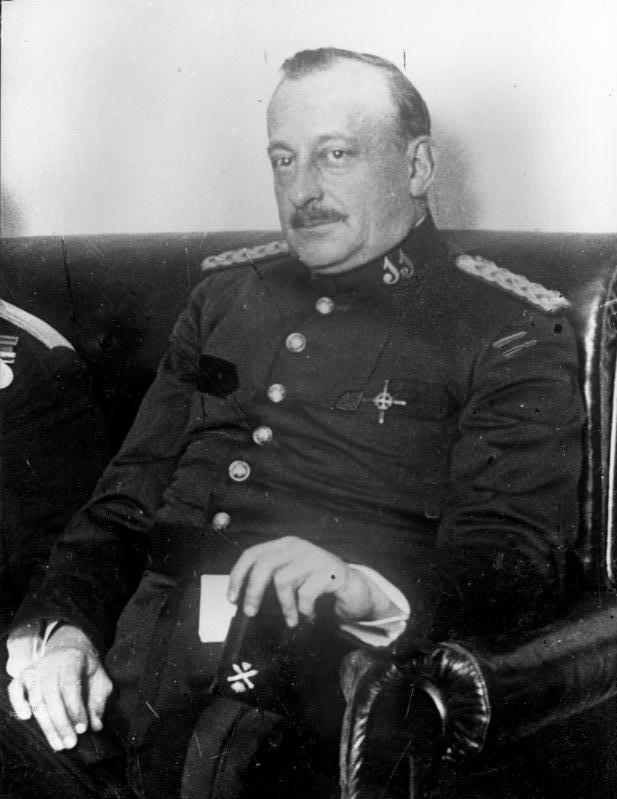
Primo de Rivera

Though initially the coup of Primo de Rivera was welcomed by Navarrese Carlists, it soon turned out that the dictatorship, apart from terminating Baleztena's parliamentarian career, sent the movement into the period of lethargy. Deprived of usual means of mobilization like elections and unable to take part in political game, provincial Traditionalists focused on the Baleztena-cherished foral issues. This approach soon set Carlism on collision course with the centralist policy of the dictator, especially following the new municipal legislation of 1924 and new Convenio economico of 1927, deemed incompatible with fuerista traditions. Relations with the regime went from bad to worse when Jaimistas refused to amalgamate in Union Patriotica, to join the Asamblea Nacional Consultiva, and when none of their personalities entered the primoderiverista militia, Somatén. While administrative sanctions harassed the movement it got increasingly paralyzed; the provincial Carlist leadership – apart from Baleztena including Gabino Martínez, Joaquín Beunza Redín and Tomás Domínguez Arévalo – were losing their grip on the party. Increasingly marginalized in politics, Baleztena focused on his professional legal duties, like engagement in Electra Puente-Marín, a local hydroelectric company.

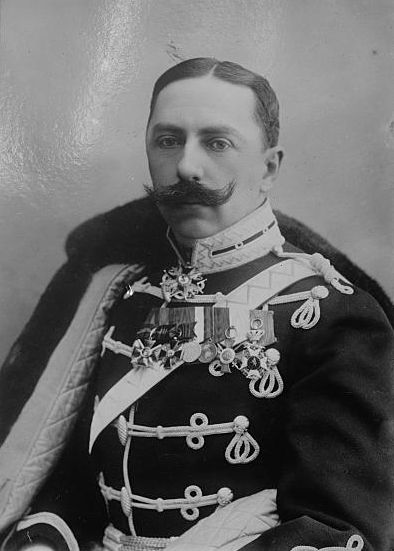
Don Jaime

The fall of Primo de Rivera re-launched Baleztena's career. In the spring of 1930 the provincial Junta Regional was reconstructed. Some sources claim that he became its head, appointed by Don Jaime personally; other sources suggest he merely entered the body, presided by the longtime Navarrese party leader, Gabino Martínez. It is also possible that Baleztena and Martínez formed sort of duumvirate, since as late as in the spring of 1931 the two jointly represented provincial Carlism outside. The Navarrese branch of the movement was not disinclined to taking part in "controlled" elections, intended by general Berenguer for early 1931, though it was Ignacio not Joaquín Baleztena mentioned as a candidate; fall of the monarchy and proclamation of the republic cancelled these plans.

== Republic ==
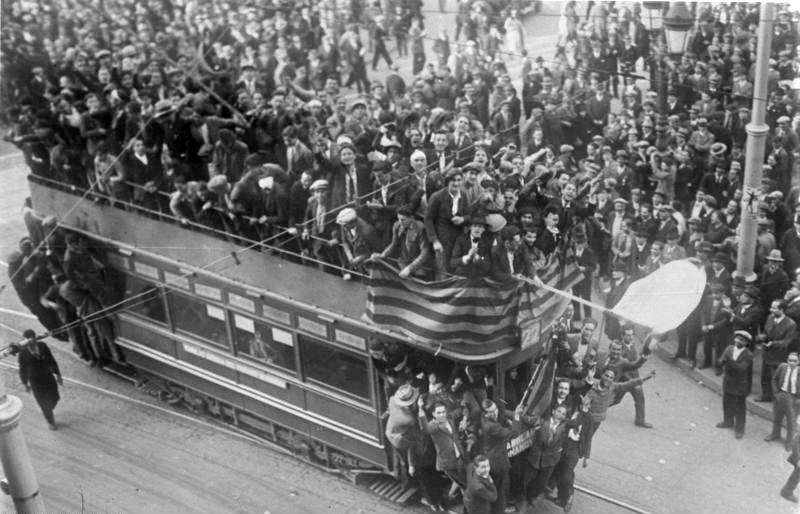
Republic declared, 1931

Before the first electoral campaign to Cortes Constituentes in 1931, Joaquín along his brother worked to forge a Carlist-Basque alliance, though PNV leaders accused him of little genuine commitment to the common vasco-navarrese cause. The coalition was sealed as lista católico-fuerista and initially Baleztena was reported as one of its candidates. For reasons which are not clear he withdrew from the race, supporting the candidates as member of various comites de honor. As a local party leader he could have boasted success: Navarre was the only province in Spain where centre-right gained victory with 63% of votes, though he had to concede defeat in the capital Pamplona.

The 1932 re-unification of Jaimistas, Integristas and Mellistas into Comunión Tradicionalista strengthened Baleztena's position; the new claimant Alfonso Carlos confirmed him as leader of its Navarrese branch; moreover, another Navarrese leader conde Rodezno became the national jefe. Crucial role of the Baleztenas in mounting a conservative opposition to militant republicanism was sort of acknowledged by the latter when the family house in Pamplona was set ablaze by the Leftist hit-squad; the measures adopted by the Republican administration amounted to an effective exile of Joaquín from Navarre.

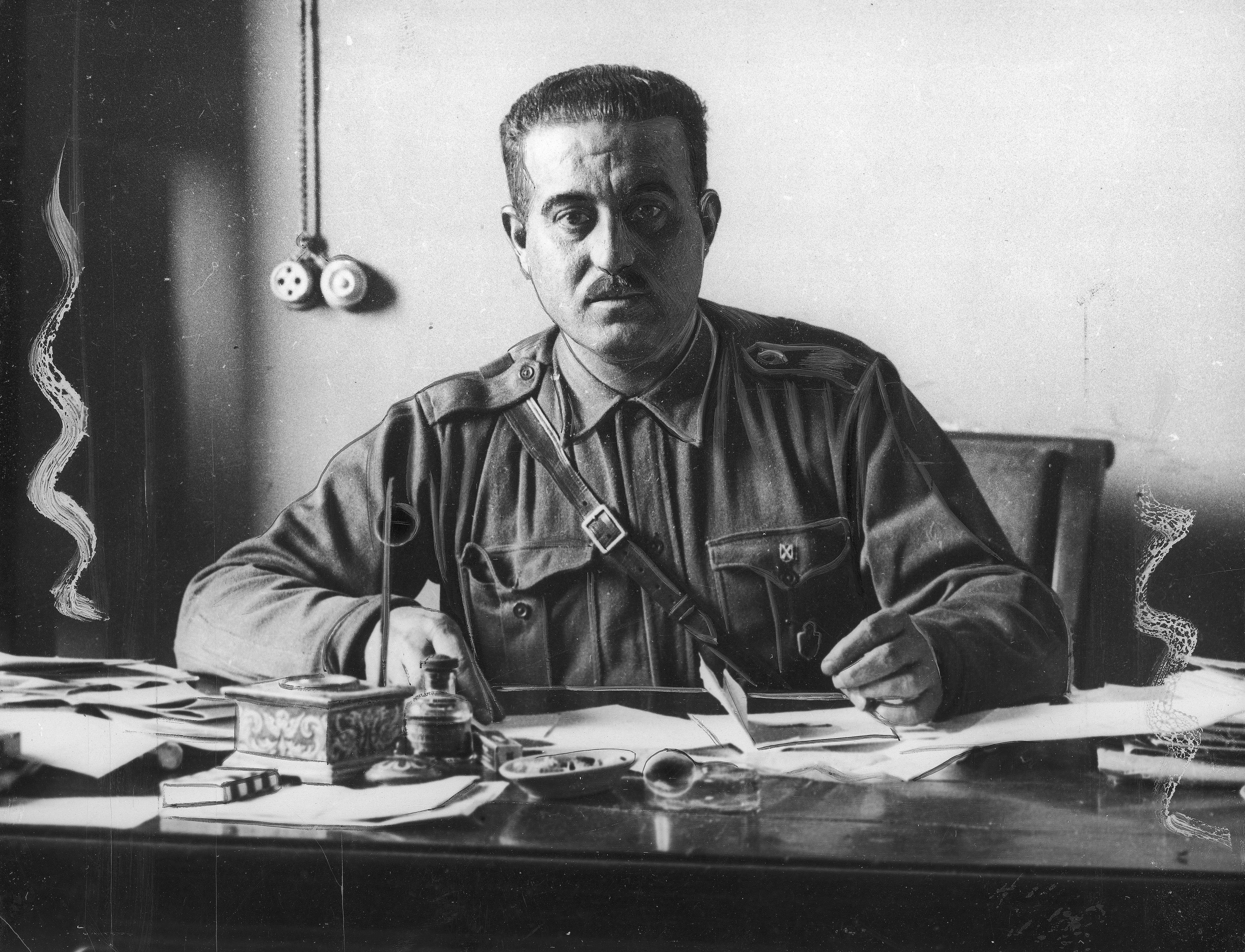
Manuel Fal Conde

Shaky alliance with the Basques fell apart in 1933, as the Carlists, discouraged by moving religious issues from autonomous to central portfolio, cooled down in their support for a vasco-navarrese autonomy; finally the Navarros preferred to stay out. When an Andalusian Manuel Fal Conde replaced Rodezno as Jefe Delegado in 1934, the position of Navarre within Comunión was somewhat weakened. The appointment marked also the beginning of a 20-year-long difficult partnership between Fal and Baleztena, who, though confirmed as Navarrese jefe, was not appointed to any of the newly created national executive bodies of the party. As starting mid-1930s Carlism started to gear up for a violent overthrow of the Republic, the first controversies covered the rebellion strategy. In the spring of 1936 Fal put in motion the plans for a stand-alone Traditionalist uprising, while Baleztena and the Navarros preferred to act in liaison with the military conspirators.

== Civil War ==
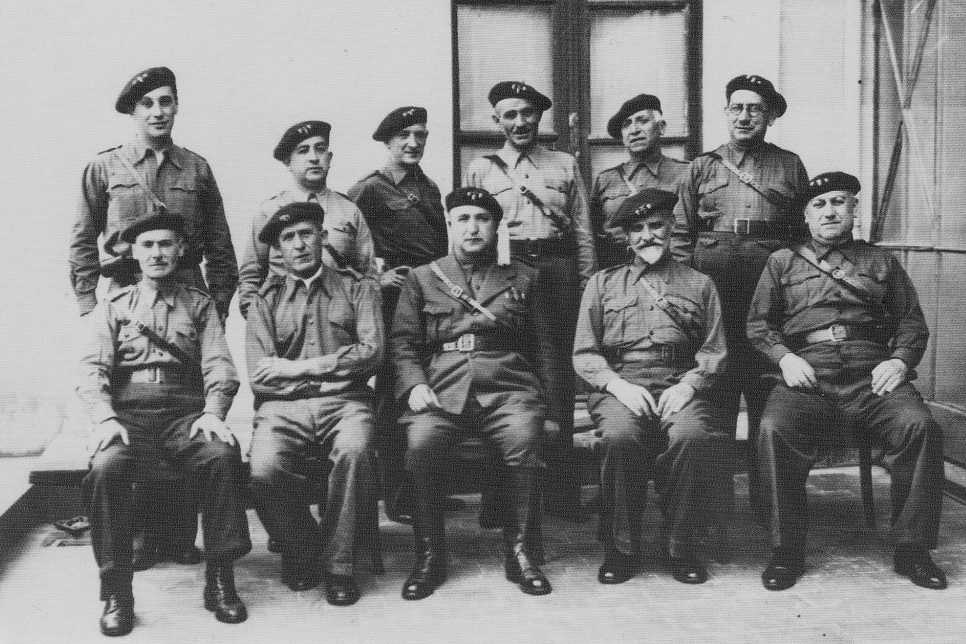
in Junta Central Carlista

Ten months between July 1936 and April 1937 mark the climax of Baleztena's political career, the only period when his stance has substantially shaped the history of Traditionalism and possibly, the history of Spain. His role was crucial first in forging the Carlist terms of access to the coup, and then in deciding the Carlist course towards unification within Francoism.

During hectic early summer 1936 negotiations with Mola, Baleztena and the fellow Navarrese pushed for almost unconditional Carlist access to the rebellion. Opposing cautious policy of Fal, they pursued a superseding strategy which bordered sabotage and is sometimes considered an internal coup within Carlism. As a result, the Requeté were committed to insurgency with no guarantees on part of the military. The Navarrese formed their own wartime body temporarily headed by Baleztena, Navarrese War Council, which implemented an independent political line and was only with difficulty acknowledged by the official Carlist wartime executive. Though Baleztena is not considered leader of the group, as head of the most important Carlist province he tilted the balance against the falcondistas.

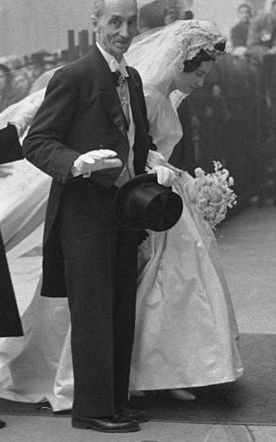
Don Javier

Faced with a perspective of Carlist amalgamation into a "partido unico" Baleztena formed ranks with Rodezno, Berasain and other Navarrese, pushing for compliance with the military pressure. Taking advantage of paralysis within Carlist governing bodies they initially tried to negotiate own terms of unification. Eventually the group accepted Franco's ultimatum, outplayed the opposition and cornered the new regent-claimant with an internal ultimatum of their own, though Baleztena did his best to maintain loyalty to Don Javier. As a result, amalgamation of Comunión into FET commenced with no major difficulties.

Baleztena still enjoyed the claimant's confidence, authorized to enter the Falangist Consejo Nacional. He soon grew increasingly alienated by and indeed hostile to the emerging Francoism. When Franco visited Pamplona in the autumn of 1937, the dictator was greeted by ice-cold welcome of the Baleztenas, who sort of reconciled with Fal. As the Navarrese War Council was dissolved and handed its duties to Delegación Provincial de FET late 1937, the claimant considered Baleztena a man of trust and asked him to re-organize the Navarrese Carlism. Though Don Javier intended to keep the unloyal rodeznistas at bay, Baleztena preferred to seek a compromise with them.

== Early Francoism ==
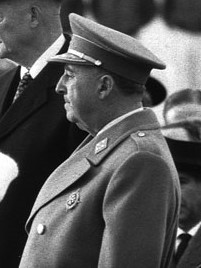
Francisco Franco

Baleztena assembled a new Junta Regional in 1939; his objective was to preserve independent Carlist infrastructure, and his strategy relied on dealing with the collaborationists. The successes recorded were saving El Pensamiento Navarro from amalgamation in the Francoist propaganda, setting up a Carlist outpost of the Principe de Viana institute and a number of local administrative appointments; the cost was electing Rodezno vice-president of Diputación Foral in 1940. Co-operation with Fal, still national political leader, continued to be difficult; in 1941, when composing new regional Junta, Baleztena insisted that merindades elect their jefes, while Fal opted for appointments. During the Begoña crisis of 1942 the Baleztenas tried to avoid a showdown with Falange and urged moderation.

Despite his efforts Baleztena was losing control over Navarrese Carlism, increasingly fragmented along different lines of conflict. The pro-Axis faction was neutralized by the course of the Second World War rather than thanks to his efforts, but the friction between intransigents and collaborationists continued. Dynastical issues added insult to injury. The fraction seeking compromise with the Alfonsist claimant Don Juan was getting more dynamic, Karl Pius Habsburg, styled as Carlos VIII, gathered his own group of followers, while supporters of Don Javier split between those favoring a regency and those favoring his own claim to the throne. Some started to advocate a collegial regency. Personal squabbles, question of integrating Navarrese Carlism within nationwide party structure and conflict over ownership of El Pensamiento Navarro made matters worse; in late 1942 Baleztena resigned, replaced as the regional party leader by Jesús Elizalde.

Carlist standard

Decomposition of Navarrese Carlism continued in the late 1940s, demonstrated by the Pamplona riots of 1945, moderately pro-Juanista stance of El Pensamiento Navarro and its editor-in-chief Francisco López Sanz and different factions competing for local administrative posts. The new Junta Regional appointed by Fal in 1947 and headed by Mariano Lumbier failed to produce any change and Carlism lost its grip even on the Pamplona council. Among overall disarray and increasing calls for more active attitude of the claimant, in 1951 Don Javier appointed a new Junta Regional, with Joaquín Baleztena regaining the Navarrese presidency.

== Middle and late Francoism ==
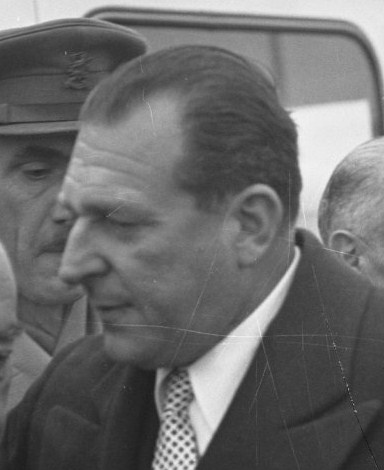
Juan de Borbón

Baleztena kept dissuading Don Javier from any dynastical compromise. Against the regime he pursued a decisively adverse policy, facilitated by death of Rodezno in 1952; the Baleztenas arranged one of the most humiliating snubs that Franco had to take. In 1954 Joaquín presided over Carlist triumph in the longtime battle against the Falangist civil governors. Thorny relations with Fal went on; apart from secondary issues and a conflict over leadership style, the "duros" kept accusing him of having been too soft on Francoism. Some claim that Baleztena engineered a plot to remove Fal, dismissed by Don Javier in 1955.

The change worked against the Baleztenas, as under the emerging leadership of Valiente Carlism steered towards collaboration. Baleztena did not enter either Junta Nacional, appointed in 1955, or Secretariato Politico, appointed in 1956. The same year he co-founded Junta Suprema de las Regiones, a somewhat rebellious body bent on preventing a pro-Francoist and pro-Juanista turn. Though relations with Valiente and Don Javier deteriorated, late 1956 Baleztena was appointed to the new national executive, Junta de Gobierno de la Comunion. This, however, was his swan song. Junta de Regiones was dissolved. In 1957 a young aetista Juan de Diego, enraged by the pro-collaborationist turn of the party, attacked Valiente on the street. When most members of Junta de Gobierno agreed to expulse the assailant, Baleztena opted out and resigned.

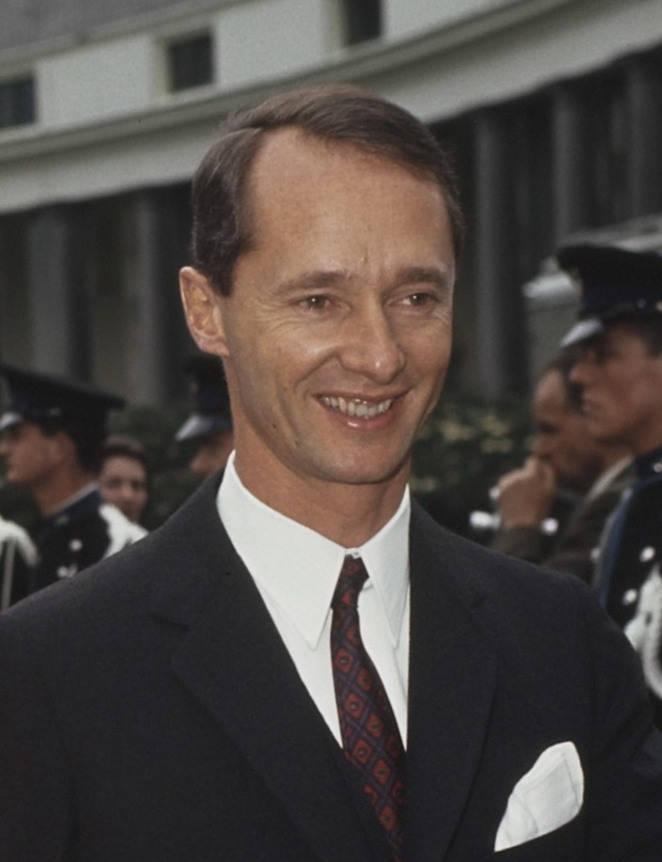
Carlos Hugo

Still member of the Navarrese Junta, Baleztena stayed loyal to Don Javier and lambasted the 1957 Acto de Estoril, though he maintained independent line in terms of both personalities and strategy. In 1958-9 he lent Sivatte his support, though he fell short of abandoning the javieristas and joined Regencia de Estella. When the aetistas launched Carlos Hugo the Baleztenas remained skeptical and tried to keep the prince in check also in the early 1960s. In 1960 Don Javier appointed Baleztena to Junta Foral Vasco-Navarra. When the power struggle between Traditionalists and Huguistas erupted in the mid-1960s, due to his age Baleztena hardly took part. Supporting the former, he recorded last political success in 1970, when the Baleztenas pushed the progressists out of El Pensamiento Navarro. The victory was short-lived and in 1970 he was expelled from the progressist-dominated Carlist organization.

== See also ==
- Carlism
- Ignacio Baleztena Ascárate
- Navarrese electoral Carlism (Restoration)
- Primo de Rivera
- Second Spanish Republic
- Spanish Civil War
- Francoism
