= Guirguillano =

Town and municipality in Navarre, Spain

Coordinates: 42°43′N 1°52′W

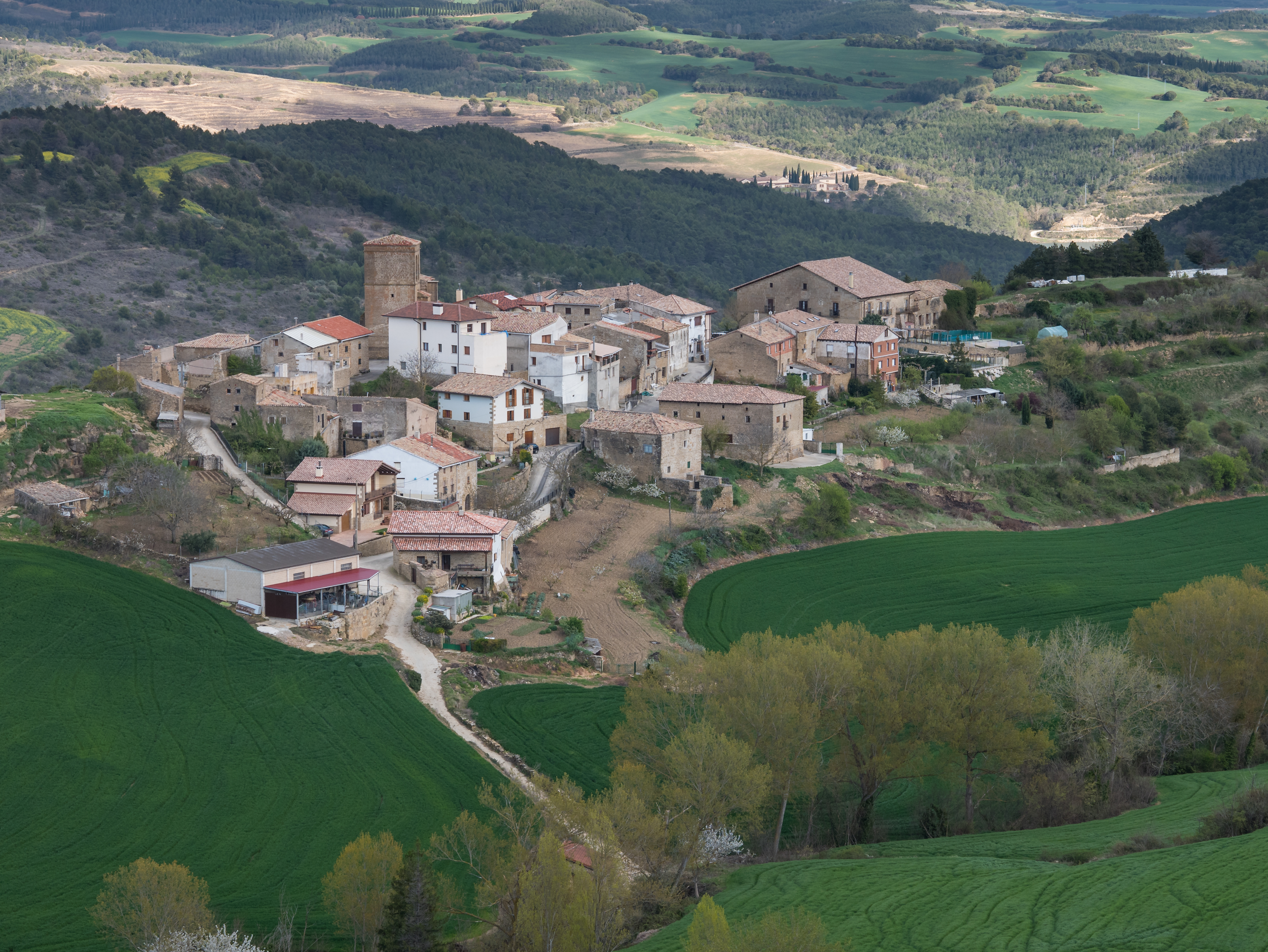
View of Guirguillano

Guirguillano (Basque: Girgillao) is a town and municipality located in the province and autonomous community of Navarre, northern Spain.
