= 1936 Carlist coup attempt =

Attempted Coup in Spain

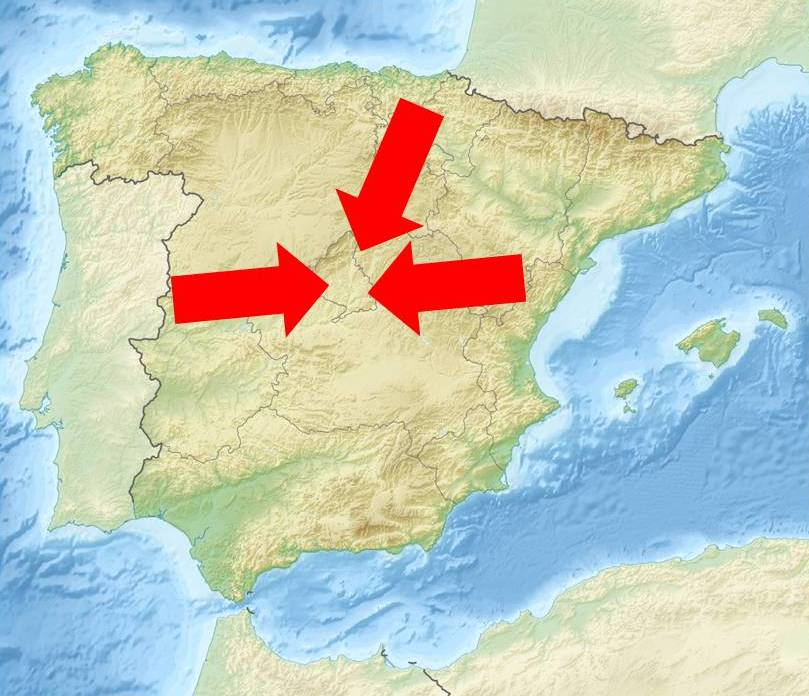
Plan de los Tres Frentes

1936 Carlist coup d'état was a plan to topple the Spanish republican government and install a Traditionalist monarchy. It was conceived by top executive of the Carlist organisation, Comunión Tradicionalista (CT), and developed in March and April 1936. Preparations were under way until July 1936, though since June 1936 the plan was gradually being abandoned. The scheme, named Plan de los Tres Frentes, envisioned some 25,000 armed requeté volunteers advancing from Navarre, Maestrazgo and Extremadura towards Madrid, combined with an attempt to seize key governmental buildings by Madrid-based conspirators. The political leader behind the plan was CT leader Manuel Fal Conde, the key military planner was general Mario Muslera Planes, and the coup was tentatively to be led by general José Sanjurjo Sacanell. The scheme of a Carlist-only insurgence did not enjoy unanimous support within the CT; it was undermined by a competitive plan of a joint Carlist-military coup, promoted mostly by the local Navarrese executive. Eventually this alternative option prevailed; Plan de los Tres Frentes remained in the preparation phase and there were no attempts to put it into action.

== Political background ==
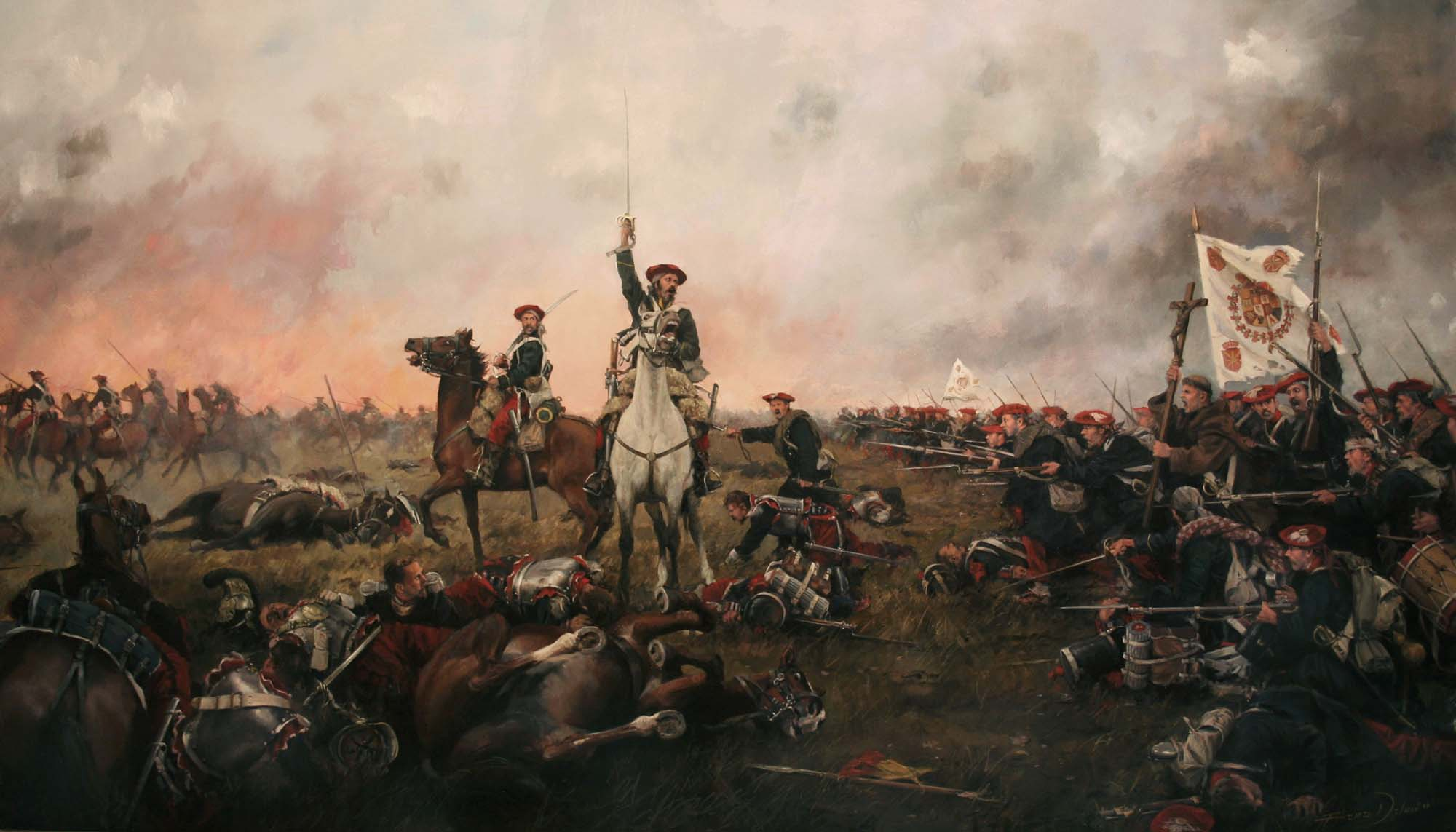
art: Carlists at war, 19th c.

Carlism has been notorious for its penchant for violence. Since the 1830s the country was multiple times rocked by Carlist attempts to topple the ruling regime, and its principal means when striving for power has usually been a rifle, not a ballot paper. Upon emergence of the Second Republic in 1931 initially the Carlist claimant Don Jaime issued statements which might have sounded conciliatory. However, following the wave of anti-religious violence and militantly secular reforms advanced by the government, the movement soon assumed a decisively anti-regime stand. Nevertheless, in the early 1930s the newly united Carlist party, Comunión Tradicionalista (CT), stopped short of embracing insurgent designs. Its paramilitary branch, Requeté, was developed with defensive strategy in mind and its immediate objectives amounted to protecting religious premises or party rallies, even though some might have been contemplating unspecified subversive schemes in the future. At times single highly positioned individuals might have joined right-wing plots and could have pledged requetés' participation in insurgent action – like in case of the 1932 Sanjurjada – but the official CT executive preferred to stay away from rebellious conspiracy plans.

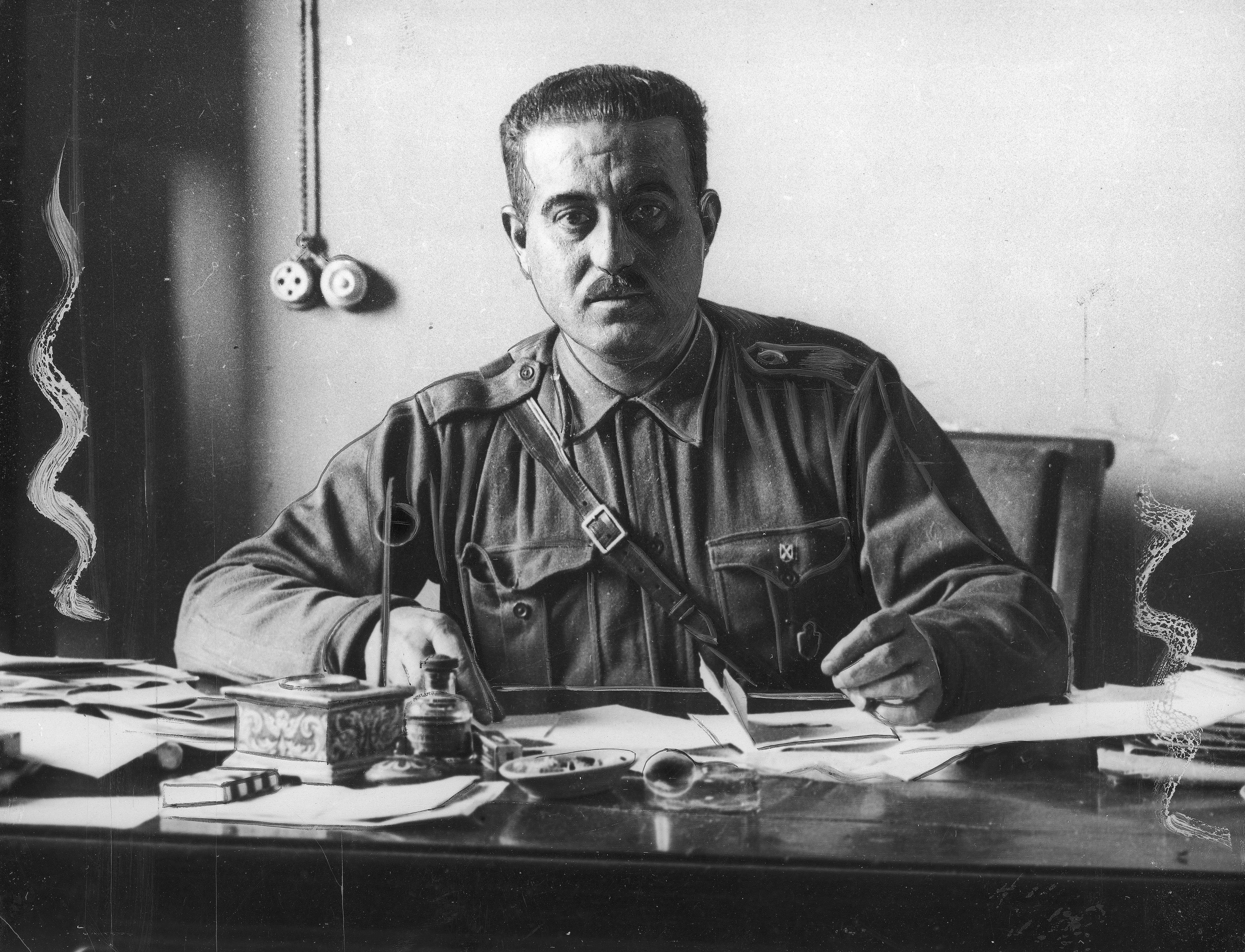
Fal Conde

The Carlist approach changed in 1934 with assumption of political leadership by Manuel Fal Conde. The new Jefe Delegado was confident that modus vivendi with the republican regime was out of the question, and that violent confrontation was a mere matter of time. The same year he set up Junta Técnica Militar (JTM), an auxiliary body composed of retired army officers; its purpose was to co-ordinate Carlist preparations for future violent action, whatever shape it would assume: a coup, a move to suppress an unfolding revolution, or self-defense against crackdown by state security. Initially the body remained rather dormant. Paramilitary gear-up was managed by Delegación Nacional de Requeté, a sub-unit within Junta Nacional headed by José Luis Zamanillo, though military training was provided by professional military, first colonel Enrique Varela and since 1935 lieutenant colonel Ricardo Rada. At that time Requeté emerged already as the key branch of the organisation, its budget and role dwarfing these of political, female or youth sections. The results of the February 1936 elections, Frente Popular rule and radical left-wing turn of the government convinced the Carlist executive that imminent revolution was behind the corner, and that the time for action has arrived.

== Requeté ==
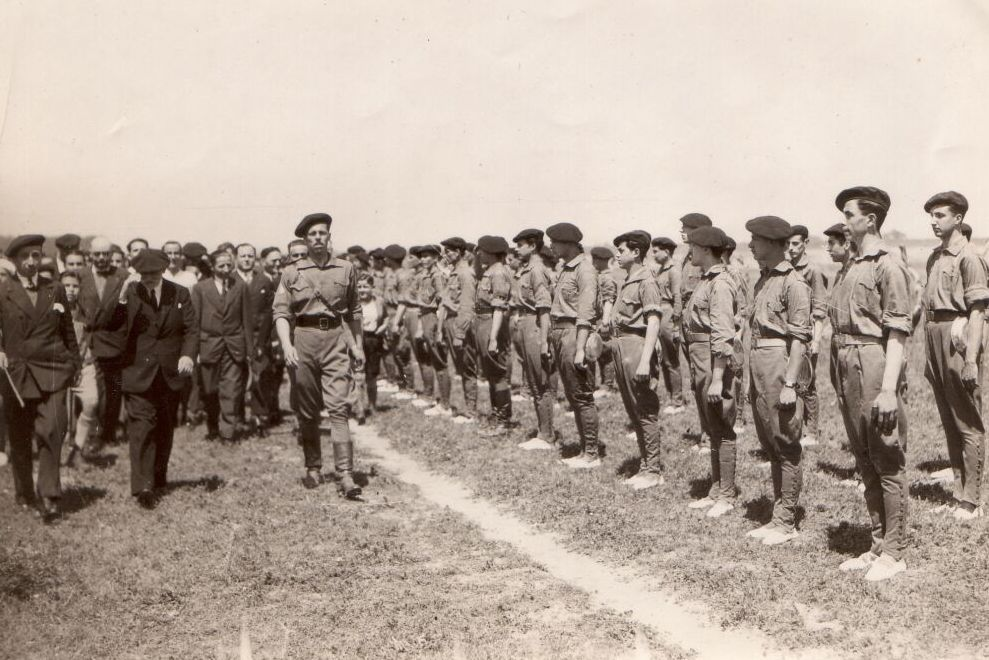
requeté: paramilitary

Requeté was an organisation set up in 1907 and it has gone through various phases, from juvenile section dedicated to culture, sports and leisure to urban hit-squads. In the early 1930s CT tried to turn it into sort of a party militia, but with rather poor results; the branch consisted of no more than few thousand young males in groups scattered across some cities, mostly in Catalonia and Levante. However, since 1932 the organisation underwent major change; apart from increased recruitment, it re-focused on smaller towns and villages, moved its centre of gravity to Navarre, got re-structured in paramilitary terms, and its members were undergoing weekend countryside trainings in infantry tactics and usage of firearms. Eventually in 1934 it was united under a nationwide command, no longer functioning as add-ins to local CT círculos. In 1935 it gained a convincingly military character which it had previously lacked and grew to some 20,000 men. Vague plans for military action were prepared, though until 1936 they were still intended as counter-revolutionary defense rather than as insurrectional coup. December 1935 produced first case of Requeté on alert awaiting the order to rise.

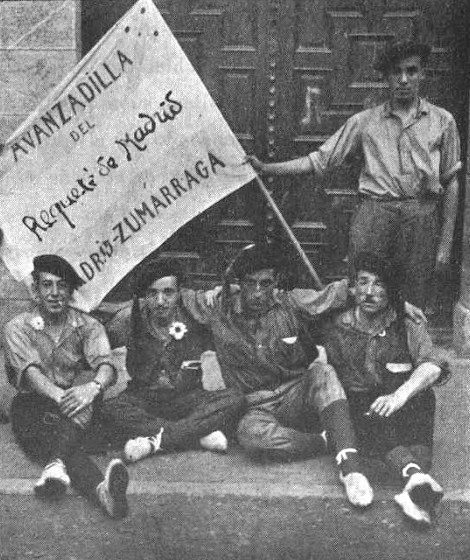
requeté: leisure

One major problem of the organisation was that it remained dramatically short of competent NCOs and there were few professional officers involved, usually these forced to early retirement during the Azaña reform. Some 150 of mid-level volunteer commanders underwent few-week military training in Fascist Italy, but it barely sufficed. Another issue of major concern became weapons, so far reduced mostly to privately owned hunting rifles, old units stockpiled from earlier violent attempts, and firearms obtained by smuggling from abroad or procured illegally in Spain. To some extent the efforts to arm the paramilitary were successful; in 1935 the organisation owned 450 machine-guns. Another problem was uneven geographical distribution; the organisation numbered some 6,000 men in Navarre, 4,000 in Catalonia, 4,000 in Levante, 3,000 in Vascongadas and 1,000 in Old Castile, but in other regions there were only few hundred volunteers on its rolls. In early 1936 and according to its own statistics Requeté grouped 10,000 armed and trained men plus 20,000 in auxiliary pool. In contrast to urban-oriented action groups "primarily accustomed to street fighting and pistolerismo", maintained by other parties, Requeté became a "genuine citizen army" capable of performing small-scale tactical military operations.

== Forming of insurgency command ==
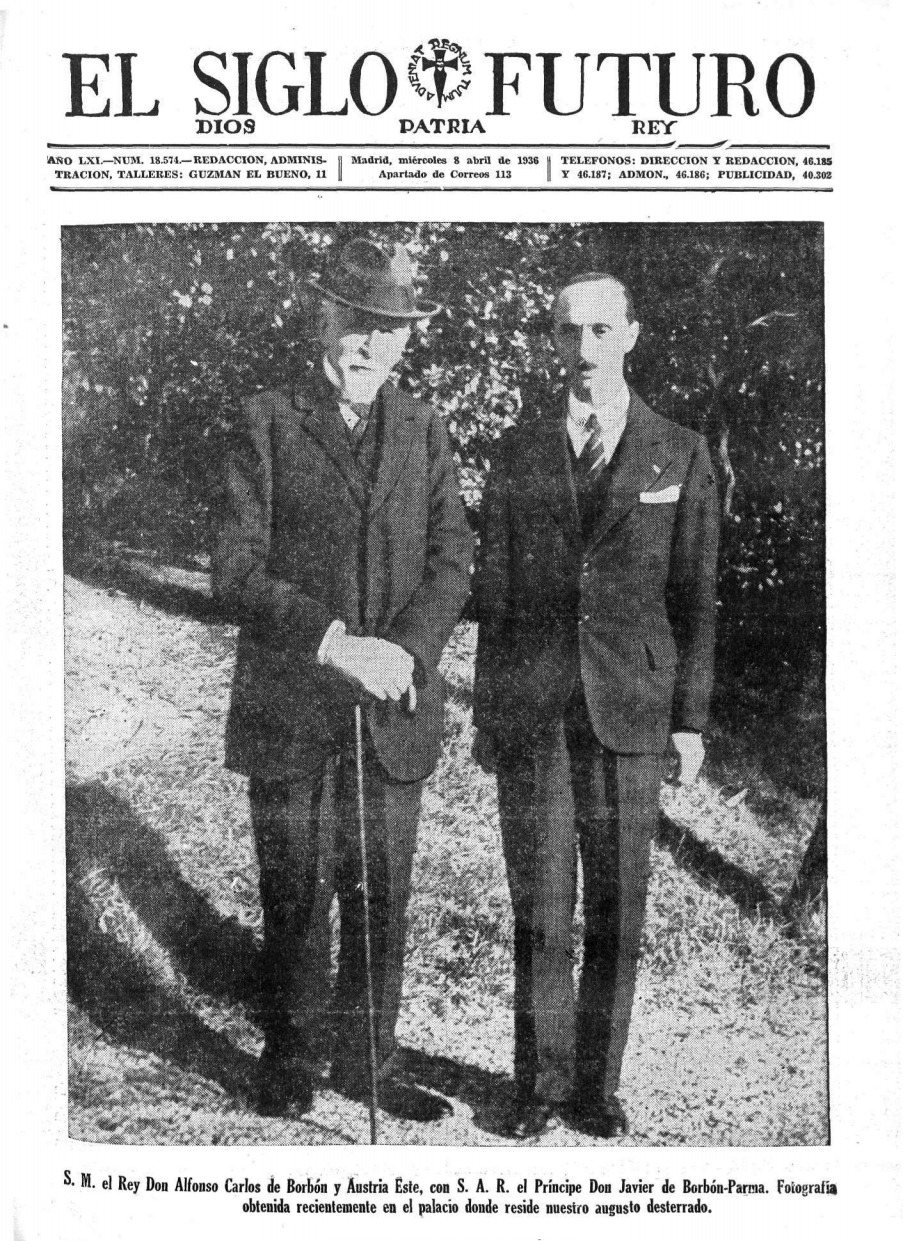
Don Alfonso Carlos and Don Javier

On February 22, 1936, barely a week after elections which produced the victory of Frente Popular, the Navarrese requetés were put on state of "permanent war-readiness"; one scholar lines it up as a first step towards insurrection, but another claims it might have been a defensive measure, adopted in anticipation of post-electoral unrest. However, some time in March the Carlist political command was already decided to move and to mount an own coup d'état, supposed to topple the Madrid government. At unspecified time in March, though prior to March 28, a supreme military command body entrusted with leading the way was formed. According to some authors it was a re-activated and so far dormant Junta Técnica Militar; others scholars refer rather to "Supreme Military Junta", "Junta Militar" or "Junta de Conspiración". Its headquarters was the French resort of Saint-Jean-de-Luz, in the villa serving as residence of prince Xavier de Borbón-Parma (Don Javier). He was representing the 87-year-old Carlist claimant Don Alfonso Carlos, who normally resided in Vienna but since late 1935 lived in the nearby seaside town of Guethary.

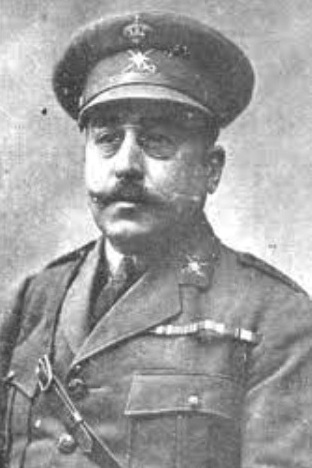
Muslera

The command Junta consisted of 9 sections: Dirección y coordinación (general command, Don Javier, Manuel Fal Conde, José María Lamamie de Clairac), Estado Mayor Central (general staff, general Mario Muslera, colonels Eduardo Baselga, Fidel de la Cuerda and Emilio Esteban-Infantes), Cuadro de Oficiales (cadres, Luis Villanova Rattazzi and Francisco Javier Ruiz Ojeda), Requeté (paramilitary, José Luis Zamanillo, Ricardo Rada), Armas y Transportes (weapons, Don Javier), Entrada y Depósito (logistics, Rafael de Olazabál), Financiera (financing, Fausto Gaiztarro, José Luis Zuazola), Propaganda y Prensa (propaganda, Manuel González-Quevedo, Emilio Rodríguez Tarduchy) and Información (communications, Calixto González-Quevedo, José María de Oriol). It was theoretically presided by Don Alfonso Carlos represented by Don Javier, but strictly military issues were decided by Muslera, Baselga and Cuerda. Not all members of the Junta were dedicated Carlists: Muslera and Baselga were merely sympathetic. Neither Esteban-Infantes had any links with Comunión Tradicionalista; he acted as liaison officer with Sanjurjo. It is not clear whether the Junta has ever met in corpore; many of its members lived elsewhere, e.g. Zamanillo left his native Santander but he settled in the Navarrese border town of Elizondo, some 30 km from Saint-Jean-de-Luz.

== Political maneuvering ==
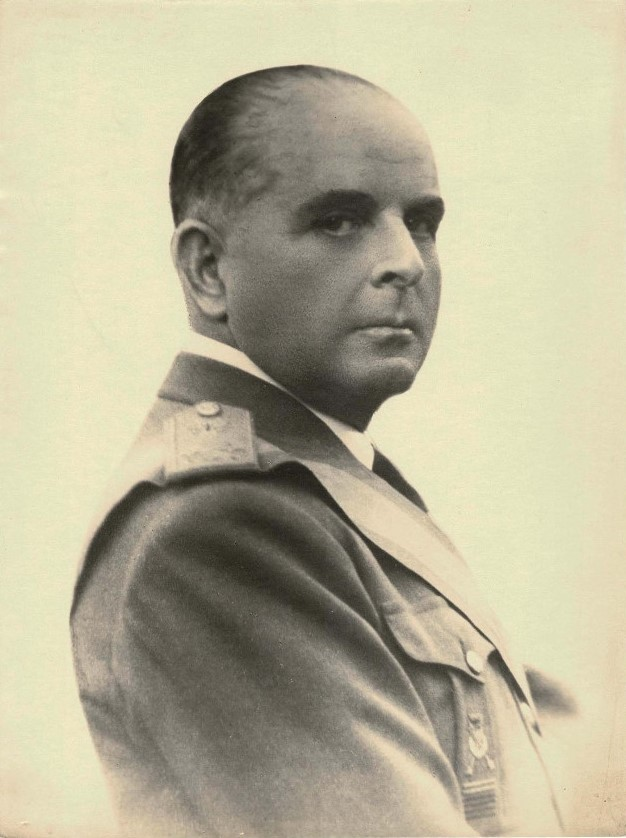
Varela

The Carlist conspiracy unfolded in parallel to the military conspiracy, but it is not clear what the relation between the two was. It is known that Enrique Varela and Manuel Fernández Pérez, involved in the military plot, were "colaboradores de la CT" and most likely informed Carlist command about at least some developments. However, no direct co-ordination link has been identified, even though some scholars assume there was one. A document issued by the Carlist Junta in March stressed the need of "colaboración en el Ejército", but only in appropriate conditions; it seems that the Carlists expected the army conspirators to join their own coup, probably on Traditionalist conditions only.

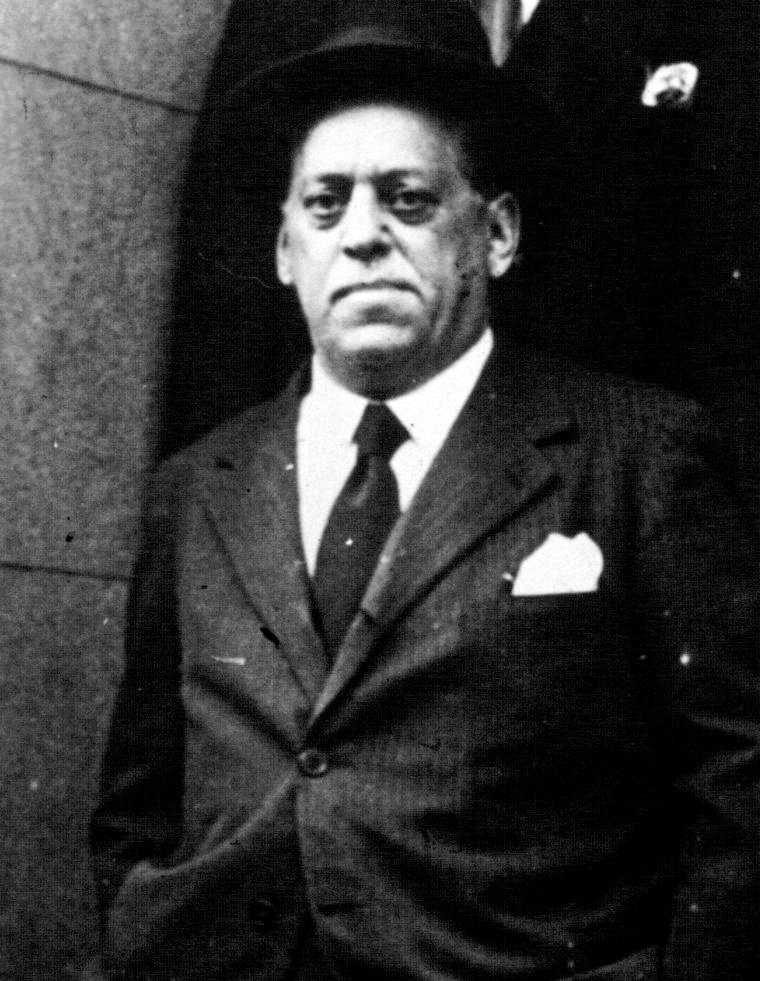
Sanjurjo on exile

One scholar claims that the Carlists and personally Fal Conde intended to build a "Gran Coalición", which would provide political support for the rising and perhaps enhance its military potential with volunteers from other political currents. Some sort of talks or consultations were probably held with Juventud Vasca, Partido Nacionalista Vasco, Falange Española, Renovacion Española and CEDA, but there is nothing closer known on either details or outcome; PNV might have offered support, but only in case of a revolutionary coup to be countered. However, other historians claim that Fal was anxious not to compromise Carlist principles by political deals and was determined to proceed with plans for the Carlist-only rising.

Some time in March Fal went to Lisbon to speak to general José Sanjurjo, leader of the failed 1932 coup. The purpose was to sound the general – with some earlier family links to Carlism – about the idea of him leading the coup. Sanjurjo was highly skeptical and avoided any commitments except that he was prepared to step in only in case the army fails to move. Another meeting followed late in March. The military conspirators initially planned their own coup for April 20, but it went to nothing due to indecision of local Madrid commander, assigned the key role. In either late April or early May Fal and Don Javier met Sanjurjo again. The general, courted by both military and Carlist conspiracy, was anxious not to burn the bridges with any of them. He reiterated that the Carlist-only coup was doomed if not supported at one stage or another by military, though he agreed to study a detailed plan, should there be one.

== Insurgency plans ==
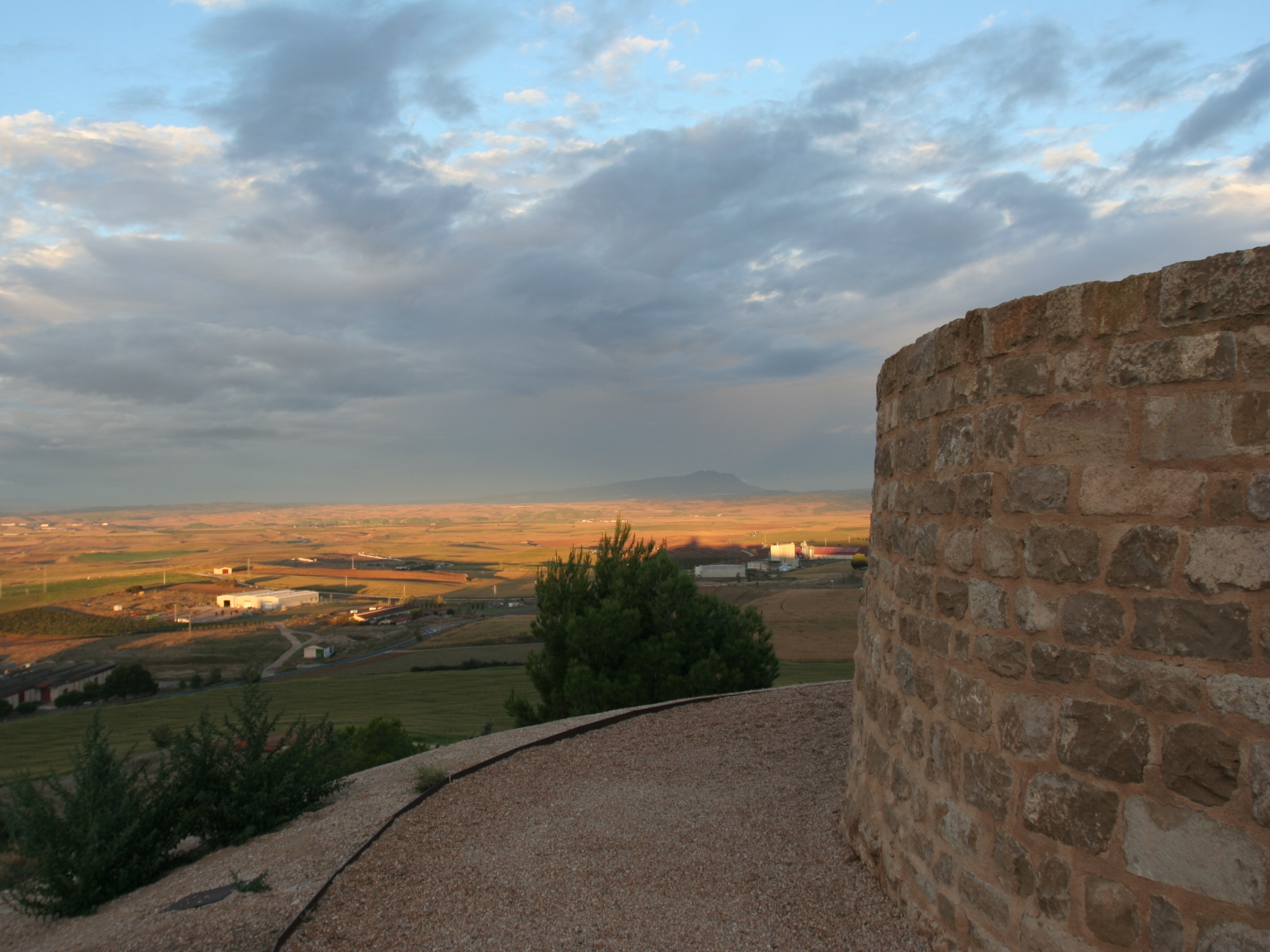
central Navarre

Carlist plans of the rising remain a rather obscure issue. According to one author at unspecified time (late April or early May) there were 2 plans drafted, one by Baslera and Muslera, and another one by Cuerda. They were focused on the same 3 major zones of action: Navarrese-Riojan borderland, Maestrazgo and Andalusian-Extremaduran provinces near the Portuguese frontier. According to Cuerda minor disturbances were to be staged as distraction away from these zones. Rapid and violent nightly takeover of municipalities in 3 focos of rebellion was to follow; units of some 250 men each were to depose local authorities, cut communications, seize weapons from Guardia Civil or army depots and recruit new volunteers. In total some 5,500 men, grouped mostly in the north, were supposed to start the insurgency. Neither of the plans specified what would happen further on; it seems the authors assumed that at that stage the army would be triggered to join the coup.

Other scholars do not mention two competitive plans and some refer to a joint plan, produced by Baselga and Cuerda and supervised by Muslera. One historian mentions 2 initial focos of rebellion: Sierra de Aracena (Andalusian units) and Sierra de Gata (units from Leon, Castile and Extremadura). Most prefer to note 3 focos: near Portugal (Extremaduran units commanded by Rafael Villegas and Andalusian ones by Luis Redondo), Maestrazgo (Ricardo Serrador; units from Levante, Catalonia, Aragón) and Navarre (Sanjurjo; units from Cantabria, Burgos, Navarre and Vascongadas). Some single out 4 focos: Sierra de Gata (Villegas), Sierra de Aracena (Redondo), Maestrazgo (Serrador) and Navarre (Sanjurjo).

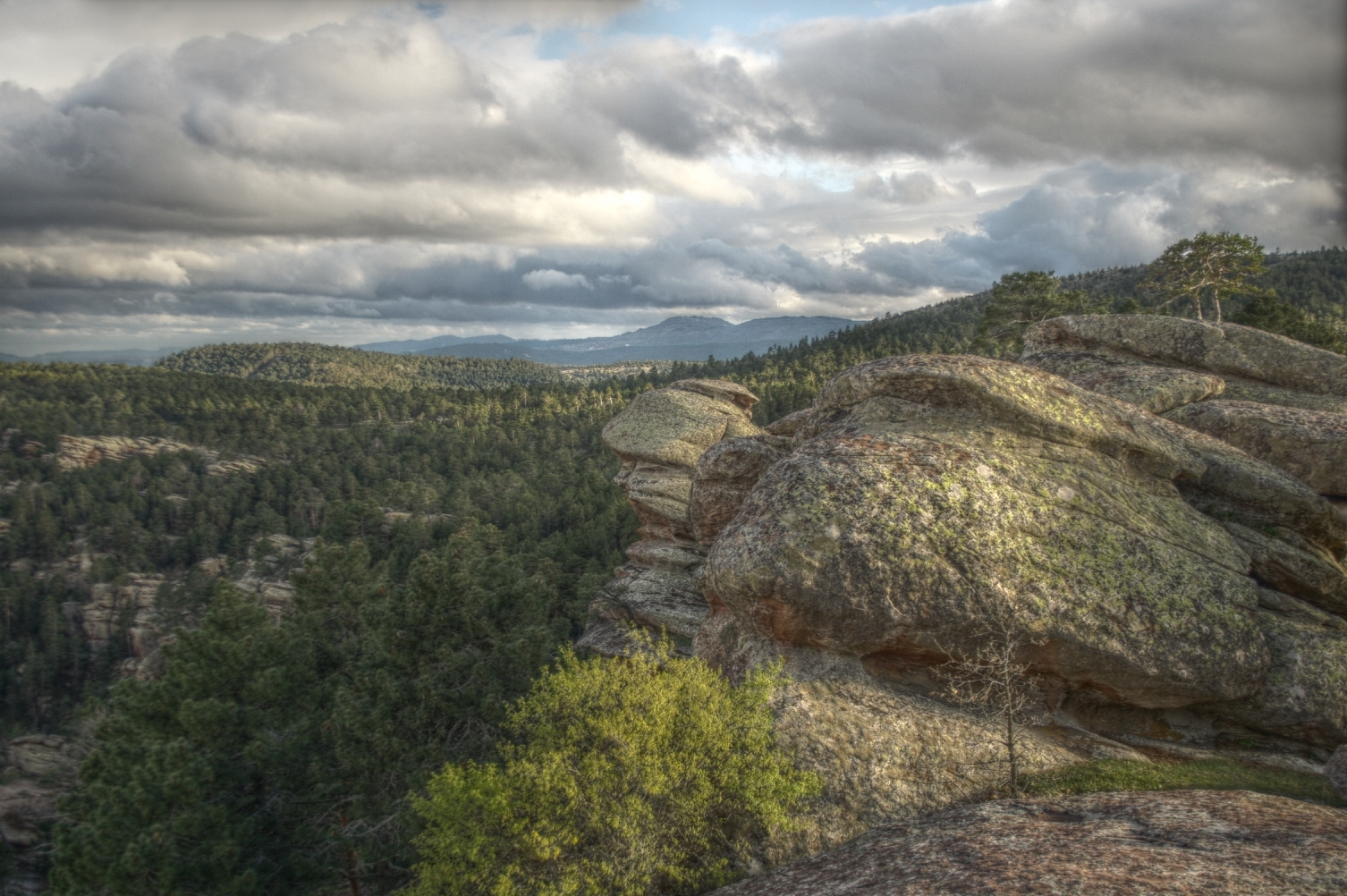
Maestrazgo

The final version of the insurgency plan is at times named Plan de los Tres Frentes. Overall command was to be with Sanjurjo. Insurgent troops were to be organized in 6 columns; 3 (14,000 men) from Navarre/Rioja (Miranda, Calahorra, Tudela), 1 (9,500 men) from Maestrazgo (Teruel) and 2 (1,000 men) from Sierra de Gata at the Leonian/Extremaduran borderland (Garrobillas, Fregeneda), plus diversionary guerilla in Huelva. All were supposed to approach Madrid, where another group (Varela) was to take control over key ministerial buildings and declare the state of war. The plotters envisioned swift recognition of the new government by Italy and Portugal. The plan involved 3 generals (Muslera, Sanjurjo, Villegas) a group of colonels (Varela, Serrador, Baselga, González Aguilar, Rada) and majors (Utrilla, Díaz Prieto, Díez Conde, Enrile, Onrubia Anguiano, Redondo, Rodríguez, Velarde de Santander), plus a number of junior officers.

== Preparations ==
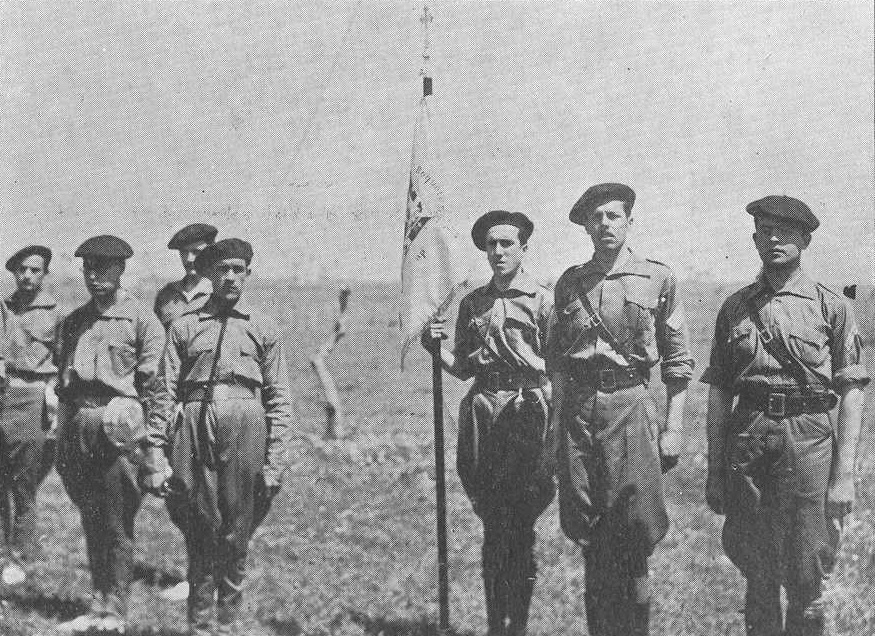
Andalusian requeté, mid-1930s

Historiographic literature provides abundant evidence of Carlist paramilitary gear-up of the mid-1930s, but there is little written about preparations which could be explicitly linked to the insurgency plan. The actions undertaken fall into 3 categories: training, arms procurement and deception arrangements. Pamplonese requeté sub-units practiced infantry tactics in the Navarrese countryside, though unclear as specifically in relation to Plan de los Tres Frentes. It is known that the Seville requeté detachments trained in Sierra de Gata (some 300 km away), making themselves familiar with the mountainous area, but on the other hand a detailed study on Catalan groundwork does not mention drills in Maestrazgo, where the Catalan requetés were supposed to concentrate and rise.

Arms procurement was specifically entrusted to Sección de Armas y Transportes of JTM; the unit was headed by Don Javier, who because of his financial status and links to various French legitimist and other right-wing networks was relatively well positioned when it comes to purchase of firearms. Other individuals listed as particularly involved in purchase and smuggling of arms were Antonio Lizarza, Fernando Contreras, Zamanillo and Oriol, the latter a member of the Biscay industrial oligarchy. Some weapons were procured internally; Agustín Tellería from the local Gipuzkoan bourgeoisie arranged a hoax which sent 17 cases of rifles and pistols, manufactured in the Eibar plant, to a bogus Bilbao company instead of the original customer in Belgium. At a later stage Aurelio González de Gregorio from his refuge in Lisbon tried to arrange shipments into one of Portuguese ports, to be smuggled across the border to Sierra de Gata.

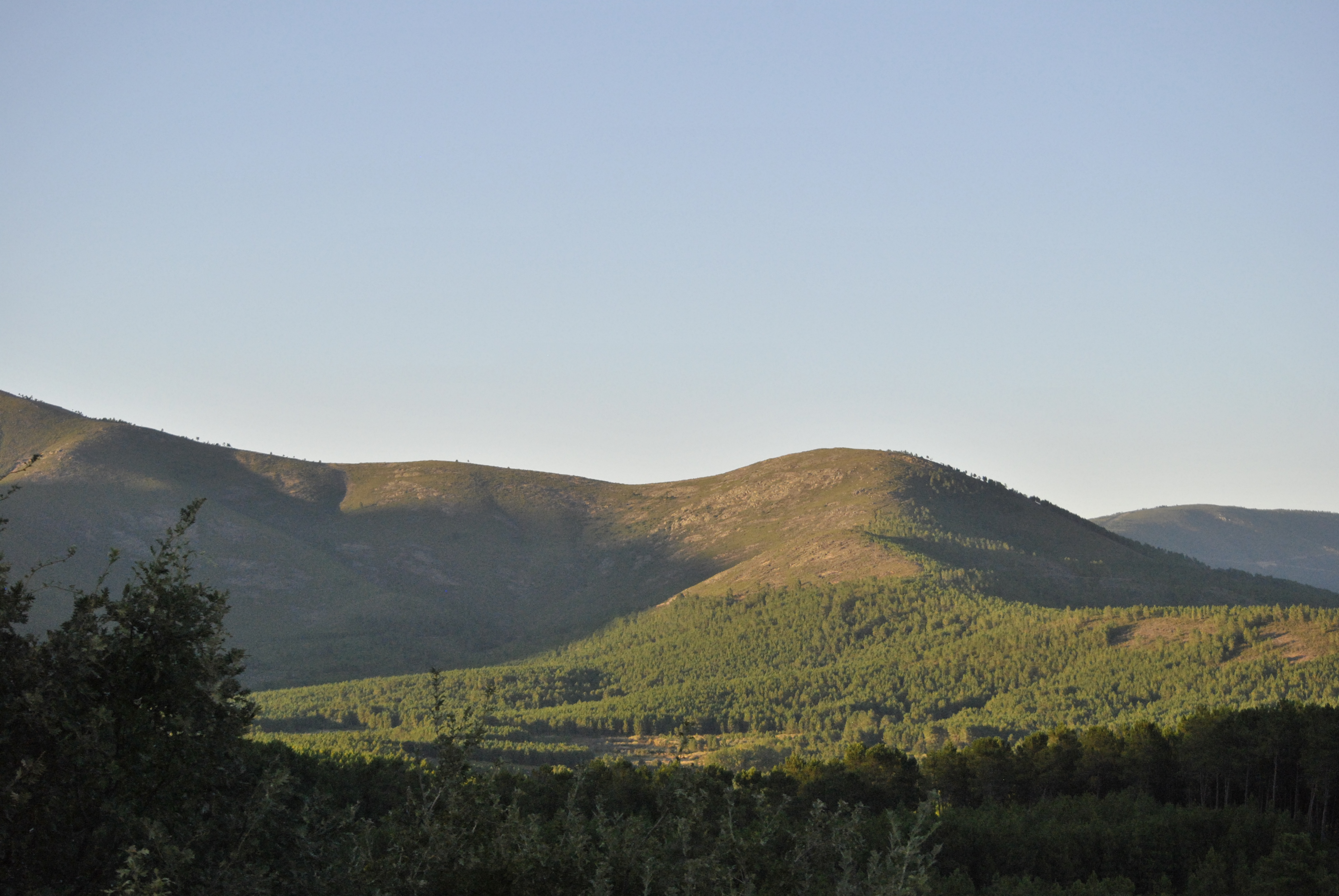
Sierra de Gata

Tellería was also the key person in some deception arrangements. As the owner and manager of a mid-size tanning factory, with long-standing supply army contract for various leather products, he was known in the business and in the army. Having taken advantage of his position, in March he arranged manufacturing of some 300 (other sources mention 100) Guardia Civil uniforms in a local Zaragoza company; its management was misled into believing they were dealing with an official governmental order. In either April or early May complete uniforms including tricorns and leather equipment were delivered to a hidden Carlist depot in Madrid; the plan was to use them when attempting to take control of ministerial and army buildings during the rising.

== Military link ==
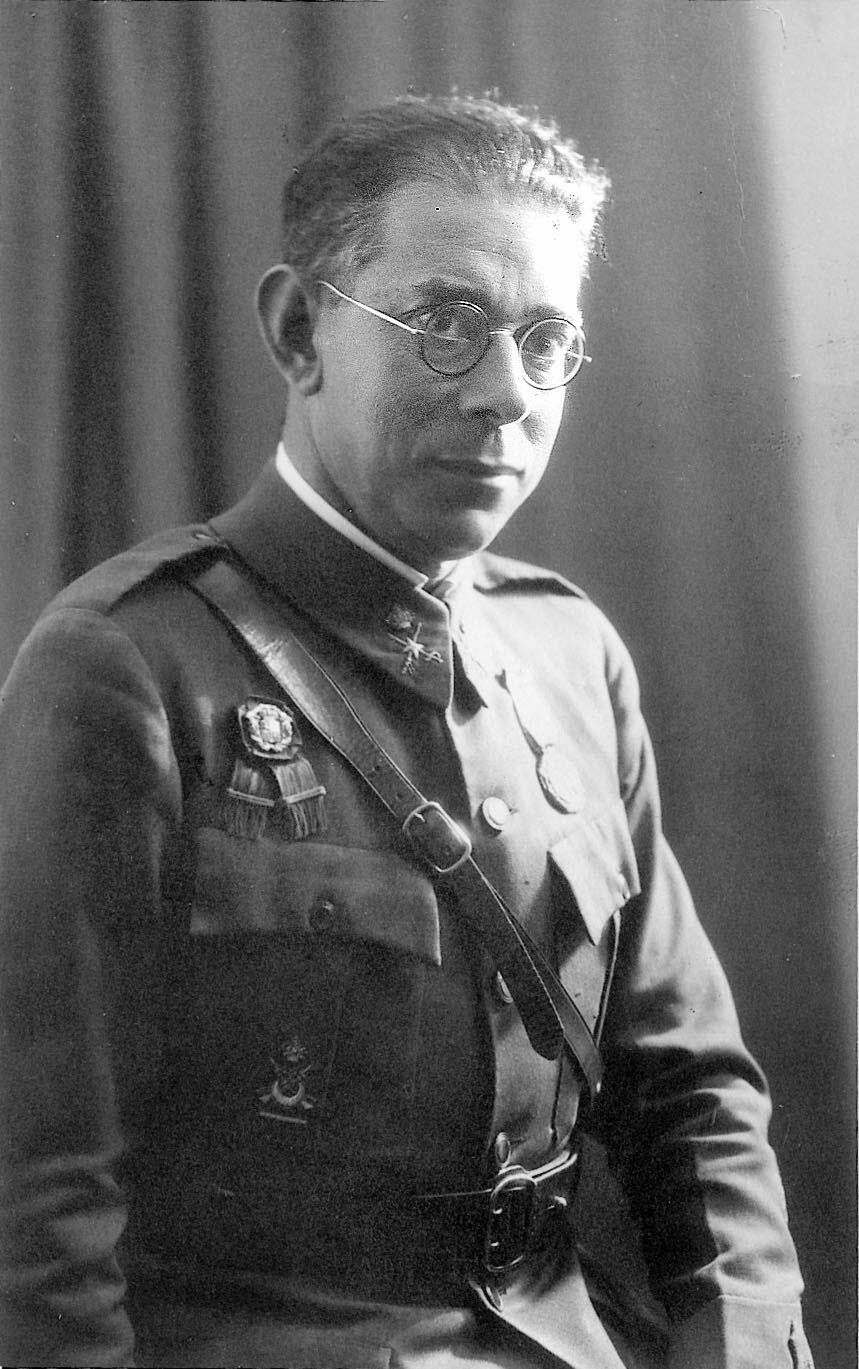
Emilio Mola

Exact relation between the Carlist insurgency plan and the parallel conspiracy developed by the military remains uncertain. For the period until May no firm bond has been identified by historians, though it is assumed that the likes of Varela and Orgaz provided a personal link and scholars are nearly sure that there must have been some sort of connection. However, key people in the Carlist executive – Fal Conde, Don Javier, Zamanillo and Lamamie – opted strongly for a Carlist-only rising. Their assumption was that according to the best case scenario the army would join the unfolding rebellion; other option was that it would adopt benevolent neutrality, allowing a "March on Rome" in the Spanish version, or would get divided.

The Carlist-only strategy was confronted from two angles. One was the position adopted by the local Navarrese executive (Ignacio Baleztena, Joaquín Baleztena, conde Rodezno, José Martínez Berasaín), which strongly favored a joint Carlist-military action. General Emilio Mola, at the time one of key army conspirators, was posted to Pamplona in mid-March 1936; since then he was being approached by the Navarrese Carlists. Another obstacle was the position of Sanjurjo; he thought Carlist-only rising semi-suicidal and advocated either a joint military-Carlist action or a Carlist rising on assumption the army would join later. Though he agreed to preside over "Provisional Government for the Restoration of Monarchy", in mid-May he started to treat Mola as his representative and suggested to Fal to commence direct talks with him in Pamplona.

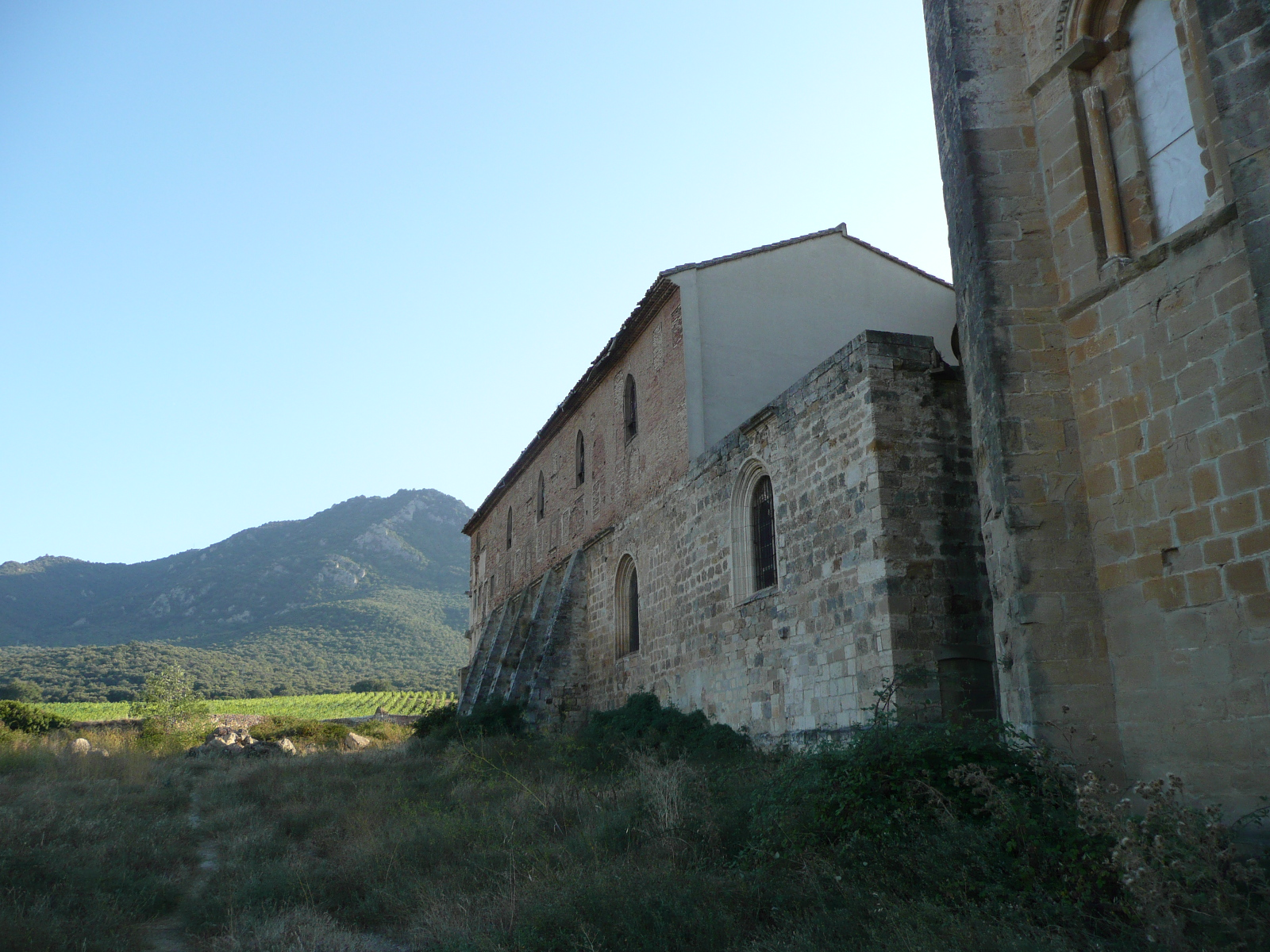
Irache monastery and Montejurra

First talks between Mola and the Navarrese Carlists, unofficially represented by Ignacio Baleztena, took place at unspecified time in May; Baleztena reportedly pledged few thousand requetés in case the army rises. Another informal meeting took place on June 6 between Mola and José Luis Oriol. On June 11 Mola for the first time spoke to a leader not associated with the Basque-Navarrese group, Zamanillo, who appeared as the official CT delegate. Zamanillo presented a number of political demands, which shocked Mola first because of their detailed nature and second because of the aggressive manner in which they were made. He considered them "inadmissible" and was leaning to terminating further talks, though eventually on June 16 he met Fal in the monastery of Irache near Estella. The meeting produced no understanding at all and it ended with both sides even further apart.

== Three Front Plan abandoned ==
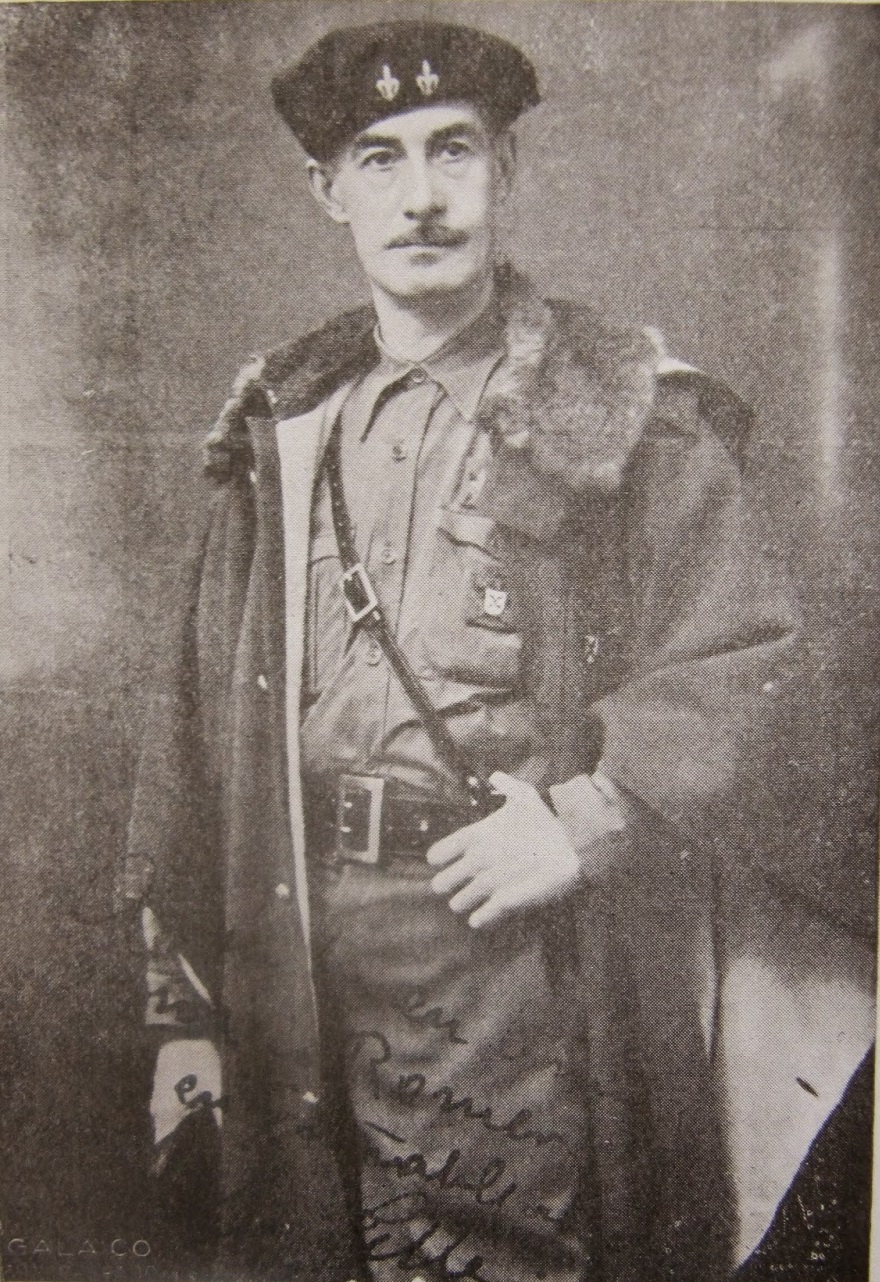
detained: Tellería

Official security services were not aware of Carlist insurgency plans, though the movement was by default viewed as subversive and its leaders remained under close watch. The conspiracy network suffered first loss as sort of collateral damage. Dirección de Seguridad monitored suspicious army officers and in aftermath of the called-off military coup of April 20 gathered enough evidence to detain Varela, at the time the key link between the Carlist and the military conspiracy. Later in May security found the Madrid depot with Guardia Civil uniforms. Following few weeks of investigation Tellería ended up behind bars, even though links leading from him to Carlist conspiracy command were not uncovered; some Madrid conspirators involved, like González de Gregorio and Heliodoro Tella, fled abroad. In early June Directór General de Seguridad, José Alonso Mallol, raided military and other premises in Pamplona; the conspirators were warned beforehand and no evidence of wrongdoing was found, but the requeté commander in Navarre, Utrilla, was detained anyway.

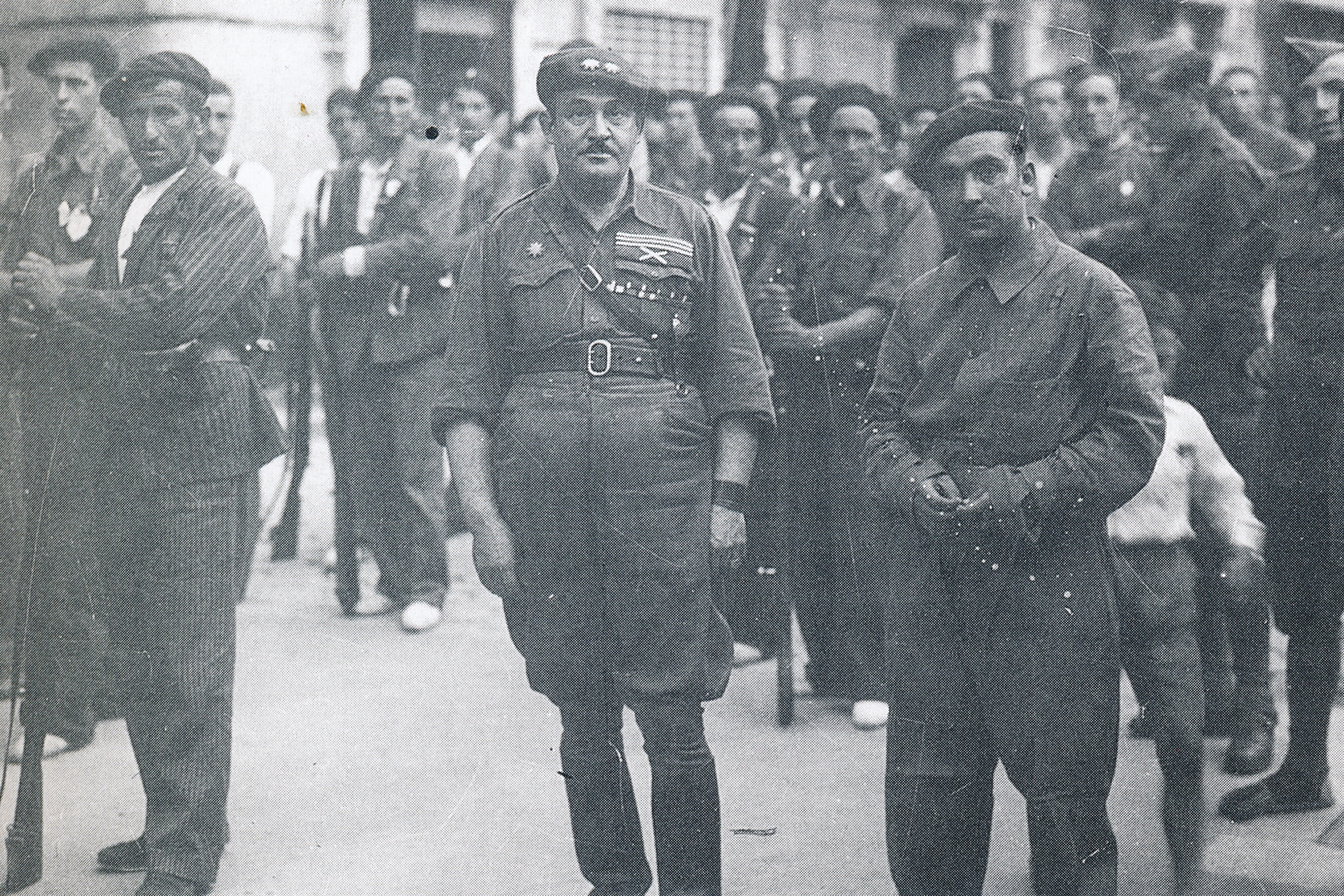
detained: Utrilla

One scholar claims that already by the end of April "Carlist Military Junta’s plan been placed in cold storage", though preparations to the rising continued throughout May; the same author maintains that the plan of Carlist-only coup collapsed entirely following the Madrid depot disaster in late May. Another author underlines that in early June Fal Conde still preferred a Carlist "putch desencadenado en Madrid" and tended to accept an alliance with military only if a Carlist-only coup proves impossible. Even in early July efforts to smuggle arms across Portuguese frontier to Sierra de Aracena continued. However, since June the focus of CT insurgent designs shifted from staging a Carlist-only rising to a joint Carlist-military coup. Despite disastrous Fal-Mola meeting in mid-June, later that month Mola met local Navarrese leaders Rodezno and Berasaín and found them more tractable. On July 2 he again met Zamanillo, while between July 6 and 9 an ill-tempered Mola-Fal correspondence followed. On July 11 Lizarza returned from Lisbon with Sanjurjo's message exhorting Fal and Mola to reach an agreement. On July 13 Fal issued instructions to rise "only in an exclusively Carlist movement", but frantic efforts on part of the Navarrese bore fruit and on July 15 both Fal and Don Javier, resident in Saint-Jean-de-Luz, agreed to join the coup led by the military. This meant that the Carlist-only rising plan was ultimately abandoned.

== Epilogue ==
Carlist standard

The man to lead the Carlist rising, general Sanjurjo, died in aviation accident in July 1936. Two military leaders of JTM, Muslera and Baselga, were captured during failed coup in San Sebastián and executed soon afterwards. Villegas (to lead the Sierra de Gata column) was captured in Madrid and killed in one of the 1936 sacas. Villanova Rattazzi (Cuadro de Oficiales section of JTM) was fatally wounded in combat and died in 1937. Manuel González-Quevedo (head of JTM Propaganda y Prensa section) was killed during so-called Usera Tunnel scam in Madrid in 1937. González de Gregorio (one of key Madrid plotters) died of natural causes in 1938. Tellería (who arranged Guardia Civil uniforms) died in a car crash before the end of the civil war in 1939.

Serrador (to lead the Maestrazgo column) died as high military official in 1943. Olazabál (head of JTM Entrada y Depósito section) and Varela (to lead the Madrid coup) died as distinguished personalities in 1951. Rada (JTM's Requeté section) rose to commander of the II. Military Region while Lamamie (JTM's Dirección section) became a dissident Carlist of early Francoism; both deceased in 1956. Utrilla (Navarrese requeté lead) was head of VII. Military Region before his death in 1963. Tarduchy (JTM's Propaganda y Prensa) became a Falangist propagandist, died in 1964. Redondo (to lead the Sierra de Aracena column) rose to general and high official; he died in 1973. Fal led mainstream Carlism until the mid-1950s; he died in May 1975.

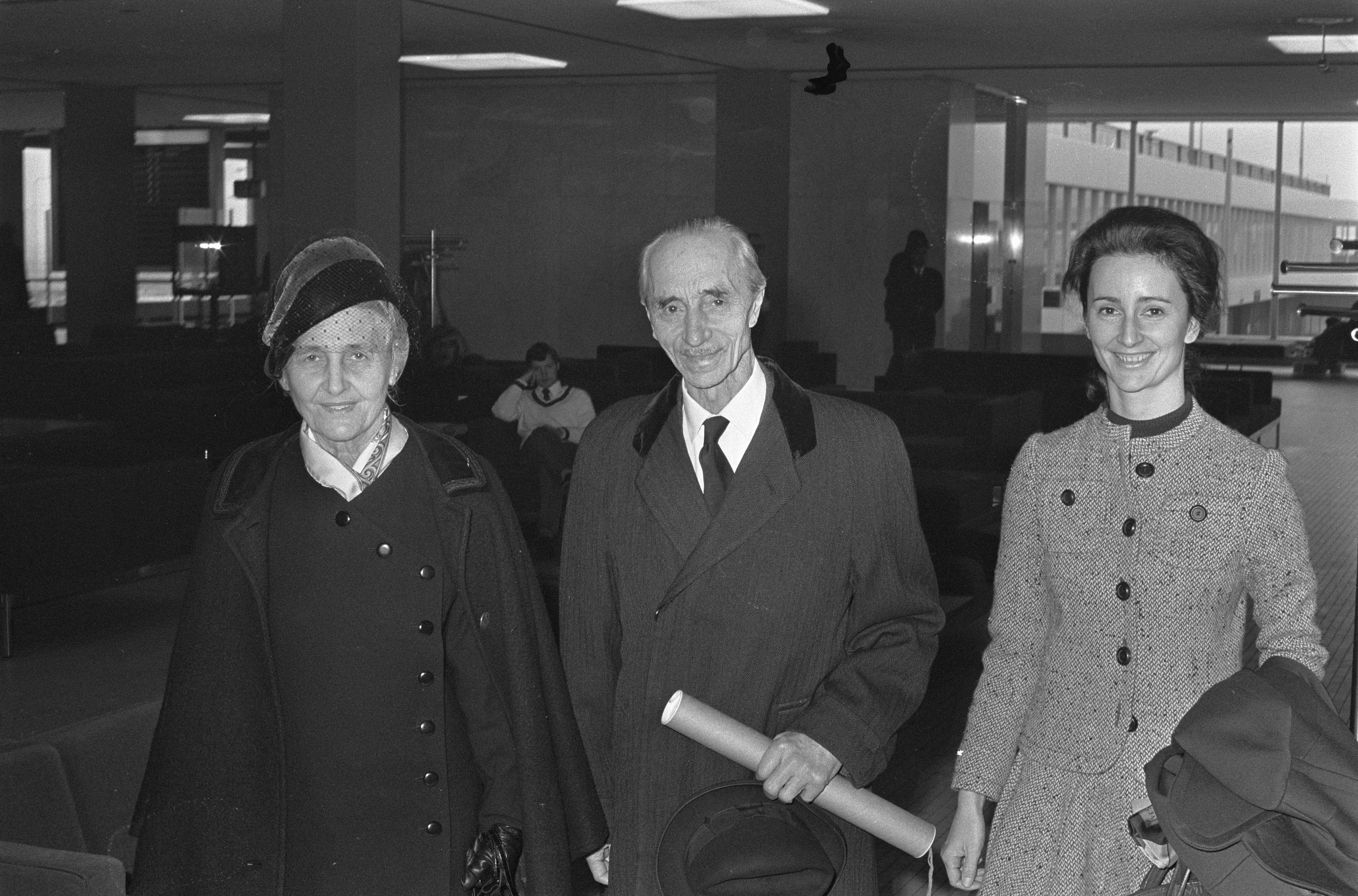
prince Xavier, 1970s

Some of the protagonists lived long enough to see the post-Francoist era. Don Javier remained the exiled dynastical head of mainstream Carlism until his death in 1977. The head of Requeté section Zamanillo following a period of fierce opposition to the regime became a die-hard Francoist, was member of Consejo de Estado and died in 1980. Oriol (JTM's Información) was a great industrial mogul and pro-Francoist Traditionalist, to die in 1985. There is no decease year known for Ruiz Ojeda (JTM's Cuadro de Oficiales; he grew to high social insurance manager and was last heard of in 1957), Calixto González-Quevedo (JTM's Información section; he abandoned politics and became a well-known doctor, last recorded in 1958) and Cuerda (co-author of the insurgency plan, later a general and high official, died after 1969).

== In historiography ==
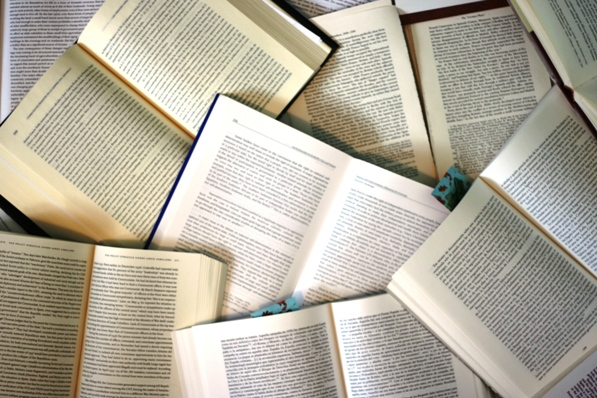

Historians view the coup as a fairly typical Carlist undertaking, one more in a long string of violent attempts to seize power, ranging back to the 1830s. However, unlike some earlier attempts, it is also presented as hopelessly detached from reality and the one which was doomed to complete and utter failure. Some ridicule it as a "ruritanian adventure", a plan classified as "rocambolesco" and the one which demonstrated total "alejamiento de la realidad". It is underlined that few thousand roughly trained volunteers (plans to have 25,000 men under arms are dismissed as pure fantasy) stood no chance against the forces of Guardia Civil, Guardia de Asalto and the army, even assuming that part of it would remain neutral. Carlist hopes about recognition on part of Portugal or Italy and speculations that French cavalry might at one point intervene against Frente Popular are quoted as samples of grotesque and ludicrous misjudgment. It is noted that insurgency was conceived in 19-century terms, assuming that most population would remain indifferent; in fact, the Spanish society of the mid-1930s was highly mobilized and early months of the Civil War demonstrated that left-wing militias were capable of defeating even the regular army, let alone right-wing paramilitary. One author opines that if launched, the rising would have resulted in a disaster standing for the end of Comunión Tradicionalista.

None of the authors consulted provides clear explanation as to why Plan de los Tres Frentes has not been eventually acted upon. In historiographic narrative there are 3 reasons discussed. One is counter-action of republican security services, which led to single arrests and uncovering of the fake Guardia Civil preparations. Another is the position adopted by Sanjurjo. The exiled general a number of times stressed that he was prepared to head a rising only if co-engineered with the army, and that the stand-alone Carlist-only rising was semi-suicidal; it was Sanjurjo who maneuvered Fal into negotiations with Mola. One more reason is the position adopted by the Navarrese Carlist executive, which had never enjoyed particularly good relations with Fal Conde. By undertaking independent talks with Mola they effectively opened an alternative insurgency path; in early June 1936 it relegated a Carlist-only rising into a secondary option and eventually resulted in Comunión Tradicionalista accessing the military conspiracy as a junior partner.

== See also ==
- Carlism
- Spanish coup of July 1936
