= Alejandro Utrilla Belbel =

Spanish cavalry officer

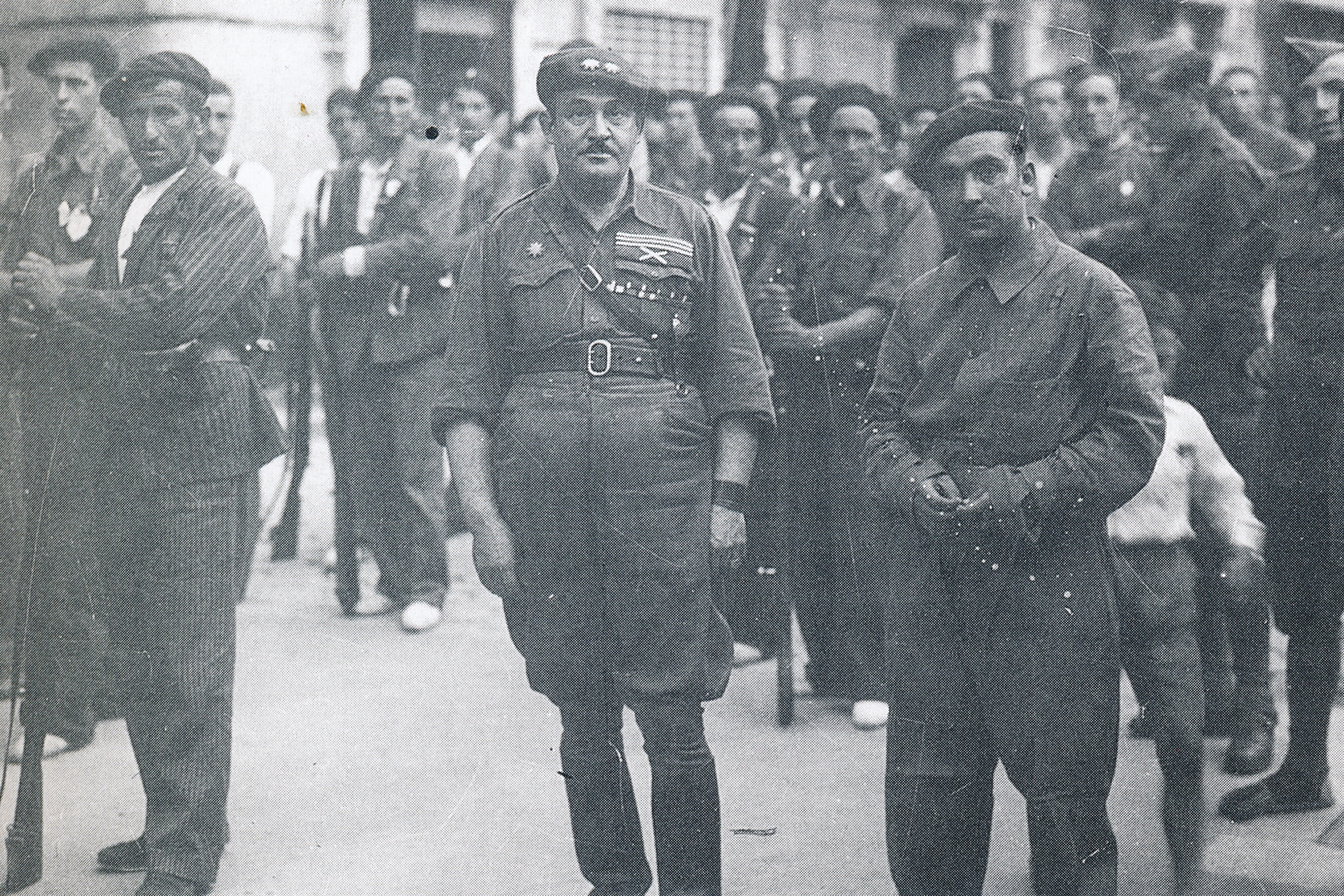
- Born: Alejandro Utrilla Belbel; 1889; Alcalá la Real, Spain
- Died: 1963 (aged 73–74); Granada, Spain
- Occupation: professional officer
- Known for: military
- Political party: Carlism

Alejandro Utrilla Belbel (1889–1963) was a Spanish cavalry officer. In the early Francoist period and with the rank of general he held posts of military governor in the provinces of Mallorca, La Coruña and Valladolid; his career climaxed in the early 1950s, when he briefly headed the VII Military Region. He is best known for his instrumental role in anti-Republican conspiracy of early 1936 in Navarre, when as the local requeté commander he co-engineered swift takeover of the region and contributed to rebel advances in Gipuzkoa and Aragón. Politically he supported the Carlist cause. Apart from leading the Navarrese militia, in the mid-1940s he briefly served in the national party executive. Later he abandoned the mainstream Javierista current and sided with the dissenting Traditionalist faction, known as Regencia de Estella.

== Family and youth ==
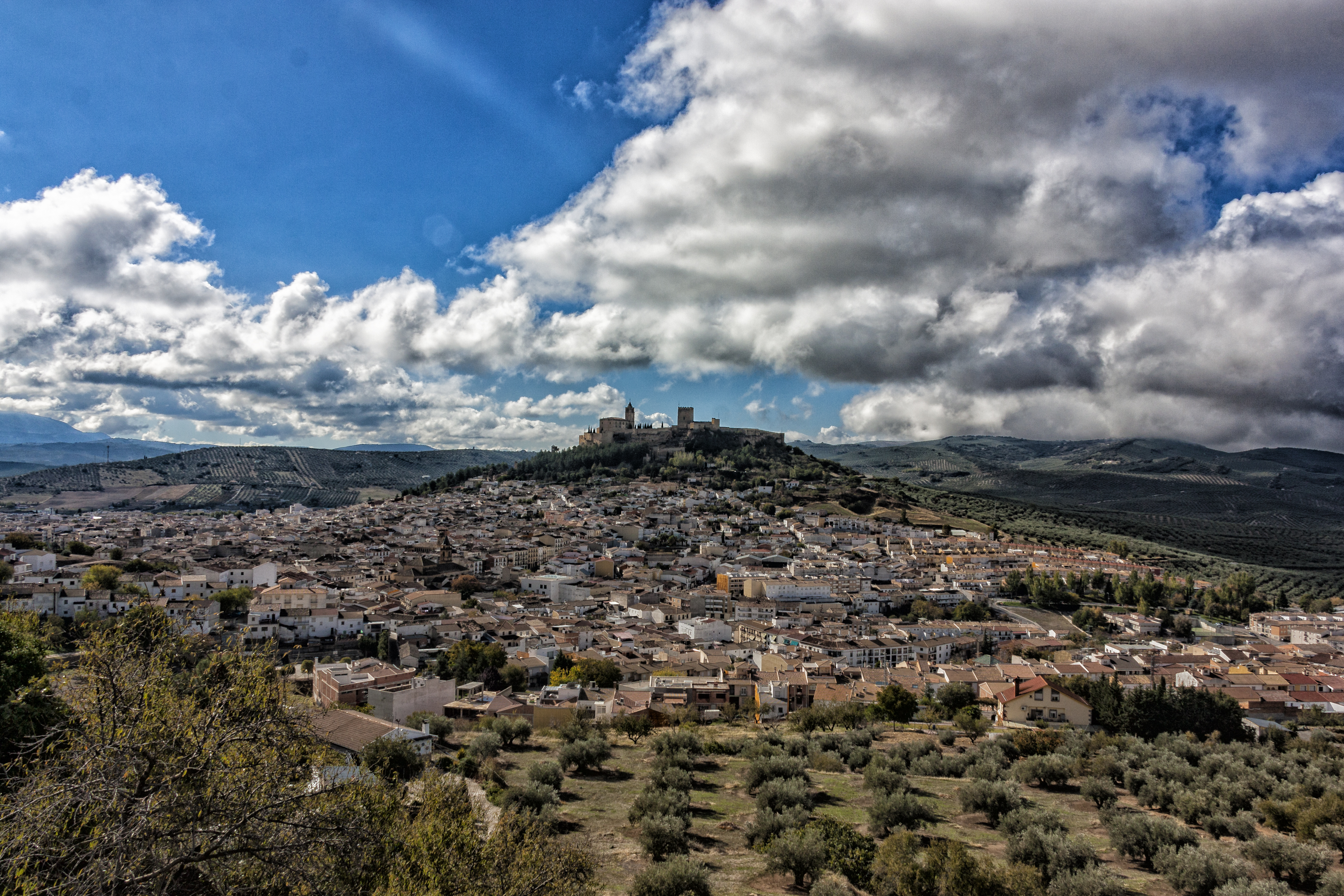
Alcalá la Real, present view

The family of Utrilla was initially related to Northern Spain; in the Middle Ages its representatives were related to Villaviciosa in Asturias and to the mountainous area North of Burgos. One branch moved south during the Reconquista and as hidalgos settled in the town of Guadix, in the then Reino de Granada. Its first descendant known by name, a Miguel de Utrilla, in the late 16th century took residence in Alcalá la Real, a town built around an ancient fortress in what would become a province of Jaén, in Eastern Andalusia. He commenced a line of its prestigious citizens, which included local jurados, regidores and other officials. In the modern era the family grew to wealth, owned some 500 ha in the neighboring county and later built numerous houses in Alcalá.

Over time the family got branched; some of its less affluent descendants took state jobs, also in the uniformed services. This was the case of Alejandro's father, Juan Utrilla y Utrilla, owner of a modest house in Alcalá; nothing closer is known about him, except that in the early 20th century he served as head of postal services in Jaén. At unspecified time though probably prior to the early 1880s he married Francisca Belbel Tapia (born 1860), a girl from another well-known local family. It is not clear how many children the couple had; some authors claim that Alejandro had one brother and two sisters. He frequented local schools and at one point, perhaps influenced by military traditions of the family, he opted for career in the army. In 1907 he was admitted to Academía Militar de Avila, an intendancy and administration school; however, already in 1908 he was listed as a first-year-student at Academía de Caballería in Valladolid. His cavalry education progressed according to schedule; Utrilla graduated as segundo teniente in 1910.

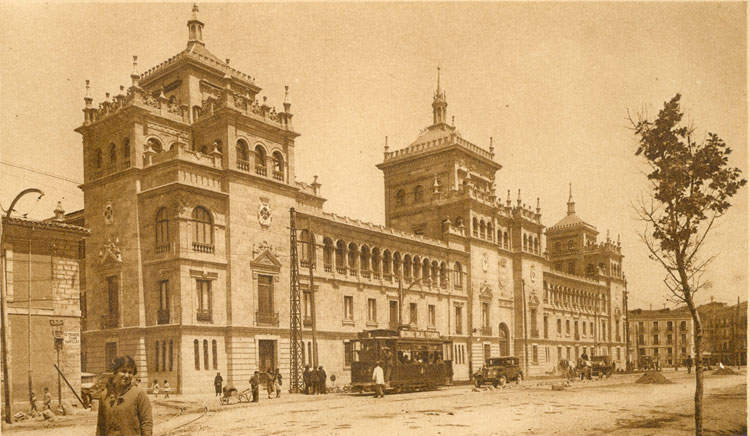
cavalry Academy, Valladolid

At unspecified time and most likely in the late 1910s Utrilla married Consuelo León Brezosa (1895-1984); born and raised in Madrid, she was daughter to a physician from Andalusia. They had 5 children, born between the early 1920s and the 1930s: Consuelo, Mercedes, Matilde, Alejandro and Jaime Utrilla León None of them became a public figure, though Alejandro was loosely active in Carlism and in the 1970s he was related to a late- and post-Francoist think-tank ANEPA. Among the grandchildren the best known are members of the Utrilla Palombi family, as Partido Popular activists holding various posts in self-governmental bodies related to Madrid; Elena de Utrilla Palombi was councilor of the Madrid town hall and deputy to the regional chamber, Asamblea de Madrid. Antonio Lizaur Utrilla grew to army colonel, while others landed jobs in medicine or business.

== Junior officer ==
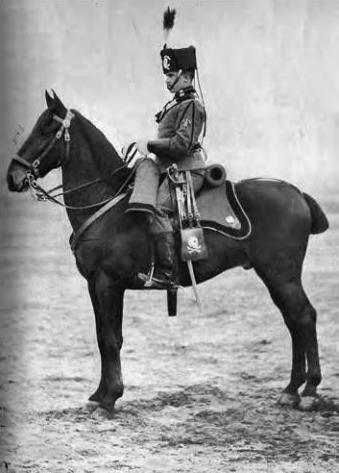
Lusitania cavalryman

In 1910 Utrilla obtained his first service assignment, namely to Regimento de Caballería Dragones de Santiago, at the time stationed in Barcelona. The garrison duty did not last longer than a year; in 1911 he was posted to Cazadores de Taxdirt, a combat unit deployed in Morocco. At the time the Spanish troops were involved in operations against Berber tribes around the outpost of Melilla. The fighting soon escalated into a so-called Kert Campaign, fought along the Melilla perimeter; during the crossing of the Kert river Utrilla commanded a machine-gun section. In 1912 he was promoted from sub-lieutenant to lieutenant (teniente primero) and with this rank in early 1913 he was transferred to the Cazadores de Alcántara regiment. The same year he was moved from the line to the rear and assumed duties at Cuadro Eventual de Larache, a replenishment centre of the unit.

In 1915 Utrilla was transferred to the Cazadores de Lusitania regiment and he resumed service in frontline combat units. The same year he took part in the battle of Tauima; while commander of the unit was hit, Utrilla personally led the charge against enemy lines, which earned him notice in the newspapers. In 1916 he was again posted to head the Cuadro Eventual de Ceuta. In 1919 and already as capitán he moved to 4. Establecimiento de Remonta, and in 1920 to Deposito de Recria y Doma in 2. Zona Pecuaria. In 1921 he returned to line when transferred to the Cazadores de Tetuán regiment. Since 1922 he moved to units formed from the local Moroccan volunteers, and until 1923 he served in Fuerzas Regulares Indígenas de Larache. At the time he formed part of an informal group of officers known as Grupo de Larache; the camaraderie included later known personalities like Enrique Varela and Manuel Goded.

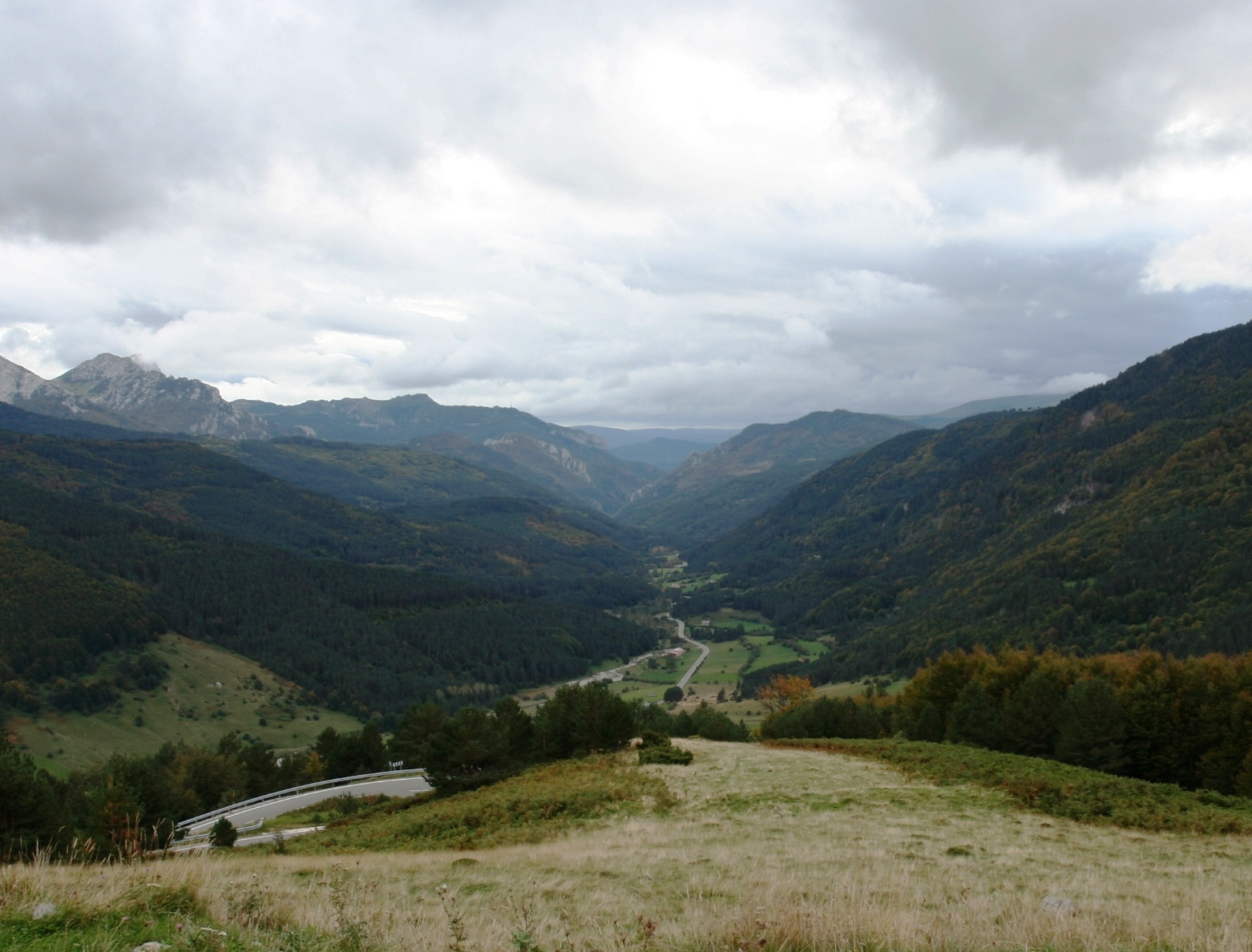
a valley in Aoiz judicial district

In September 1923 the coup of Primo de Rivera terminated the period of liberal democracy in Spain; the dictator intended to replace the perceived rotten and corrupted system with a new, efficient regime. Part of the plan was to dispatch military inspectors (delegados gubernativos) to reform local government and instill patriotism in the population; they were expected to root out the patronage networks of caciques and catalyze the emergence of new, prototypical Spanish citizen through cultural and propagandistic means. In December 1923 Utrilla was nominated to such a role and assigned to the Navarrese district of Aoiz. Nothing is known of his endeavors at the Pyrenean foothills. However, the concept of delegados gubernativos attracted increasing criticism; some claimed that it backfired by alienating local population and generating animosity towards the army. Since mid-1924 Primo started to withdraw his delegados; in December 1924 Utrilla was recalled from Navarre and in early 1925 he returned to Morocco.

== Senior officer ==
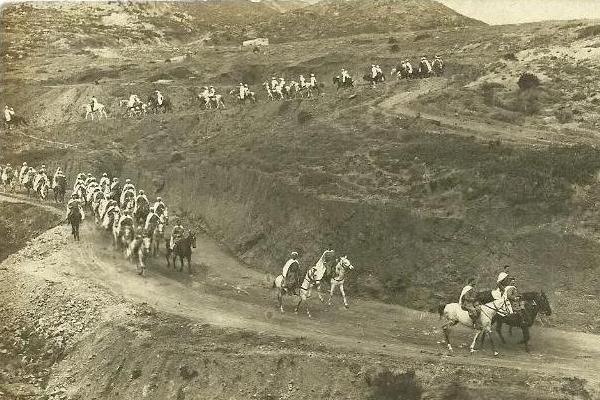
regulares in action, Morocco

Back in Africa Utrilla was posted again to lead the indigenous troops, though this time he was assigned to Fuerzas Regulares Indígenas de Ceuta. It is not clear whether he took part in combat during the final, victorious Spanish campaign following the Alhucemas landing late in 1925. However, in 1926 he was already promoted to comandante (major) and included in Expedientes de Recompensas por Meritos de Guerra, a summary package of rewards intended for distinguished officers of gallant service. Since early 1927 he was put in command of 3. Grupo de Fuerzas Regulares Indígenas de Ceuta, the unit comparable to a regiment. As there was hardly any wartime action recorded in Morocco at the time, the unit was deployed on vigilance and patrol duties; this proved to be Utrilla's last assignment in Africa.

In late 1927 Utrilla was transferred back to the peninsula and posted to the prestigious 2. Regimento de Lanceros Reina unit, stationed in Alcalá de Henares. He served on the garrison duty slightly longer than 2 years; jointly with 3 other officers in the rank of a major, he was positioned third in the command chain of the regiment. In late 1929 Utrilla commenced his second spell in Navarre, though it is not clear whether this was on his request. Promoted to teniente coronel (lieutenant colonel), he was moved to the Cazadores de Almansa regiment, based in Pamplona, to assume the role of second-in-command. In 1930–1931, during the fall of the dictatorship, dictablanda and declaration of the Republic, he kept serving in Pamplona.

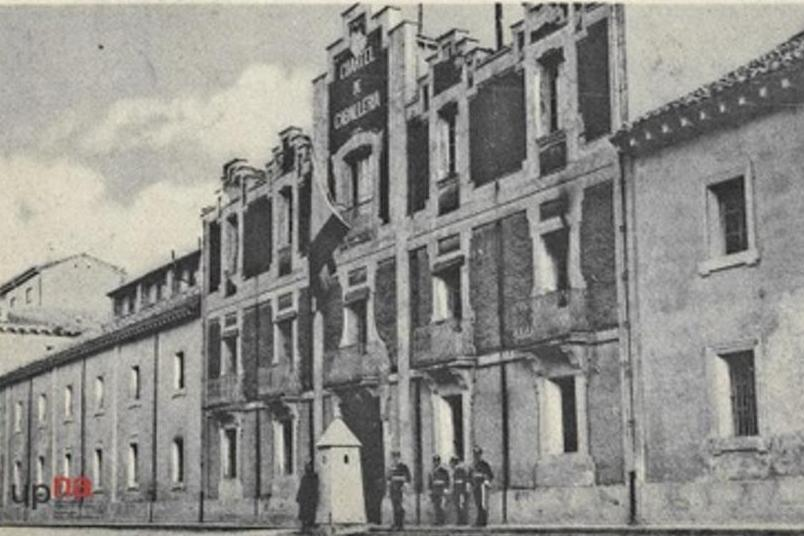
cavalry barracks, Pamplona

The republican government of Manuel Azaña embarked on major reform of the army. The sore point within the officer corps was the method of promotion, with so-called "africanistas" opting for combat merits, and so-called "junteros" preferring the strict seniority rule. As africanistas were considered the most reactionary segment of the army Azaña sided with the junteros; strict seniority was restored and all merit promotions were retracted, subject to review. For Utrilla it boiled down to annulment of his promotion to teniente coronel; he was downgraded to comandante, though this retraction was paired with reception of Cruz de Merito Militar, second class. Some time in late 1931 or early 1932 Utrilla left Navarre and following 21 years returned to Catalonia; he was transferred to Barcelona, home to his new unit, 10. Regimento de Caballería. The service in ciudad condal did not last long. One of the objectives of the ongoing military reform was to scale down what was perceived as an overgrown officer corps; the government deployed a scheme, partially forcing and partially encouraging officers to retire. It is not clear what mechanism worked for Utrilla; in August 1932 he was declared voluntarily retired and as pensioner moved back to Alcalá la Real.

== In conspiracy ==
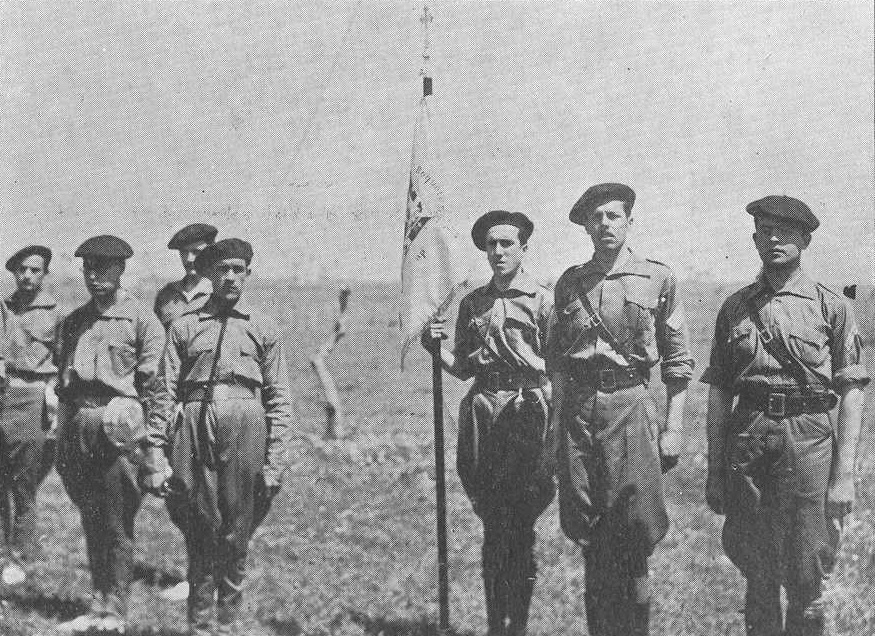
drill of Andalusian requeté, 1934

According to some historians many retired officers, embittered by governmental policy towards the army, used their leisure time to conspire. This was the case of Utrilla, though mechanism of his exact political choice remains obscure; he neared the Carlists. In 1935 he already publicly identified as a Traditionalist; he subscribed to the official party press mouthpiece and himself published Traditionalist pieces in the local daily. At one stage he engaged in organization and training of the East Andalusian branch of the party para-military militia, the requetés; according to some sources, he headed the Andalusian requeté organization.

In early 1936 the party command nominated Utrilla Inspector General de Requeté de Navarra. His task was to re-organize and train the local paramilitary; during the next few months he kept cruising the region busy with recruitment, nominations, planning, drills, and arms smuggling. By late January the force grew to one tercio, a unit which comprised some 250 men in three companies. During the February elections his people manned security points in Pamplona, officially helping to maintain order. Following victory of Popular Front Utrilla put his requeté in state of alarm, apparently anticipating a revolutionary turmoil; it took orders from Carlist high command to lift it.

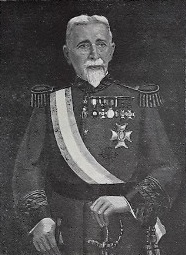
Don Alfonso Carlos

In the spring of 1936 Utrilla entered the Carlist Supreme Military Junta and was involved in drafting rebel plans; he was supposed to lead an insurgent requeté column during a planned Carlist-only rising. The plan was abandoned due to counter-action of state security services. Initially Utrilla was not identified as involved, but during a June raid of jefe de seguridad Mallol he was briefly detained on suspicion of illegal possession of arms. As no proof has been found Utrilla was released, but since then he went into hiding when in regional conspiracy command; he is credited for future efficiency of the rebels in Navarre, though he procured weapons also for the Catalan branch. In early July 1936 he headed a semi-clandestine military academy in Pamplona, in name of the Carlist claimant Alfonso Carlos appointing NCOs and officers.

At the time there was some tension between the local Navarrese executive and the national command led by Manuel Fal Conde. Utrilla stayed on good terms with both groups; some authors portray him as a person who – apart from enjoying genuine charisma and confidence among the volunteers – demonstrated also some mediation skills. However, on July 13 he issued a directive which instructed the requetés to rise only on strict order from the militia leadership, a reflection of lingering tension within the party command. As a senior career officer he served also as a Traditionalist link to head of military conspiracy, general Mola, and met him on July 14 to discuss the Carlist terms of access. On July 15 Utrilla issued to Navarrese requeté an order to rise with no date indicated; on July 18 it was specified as the following morning.

== Civil War ==
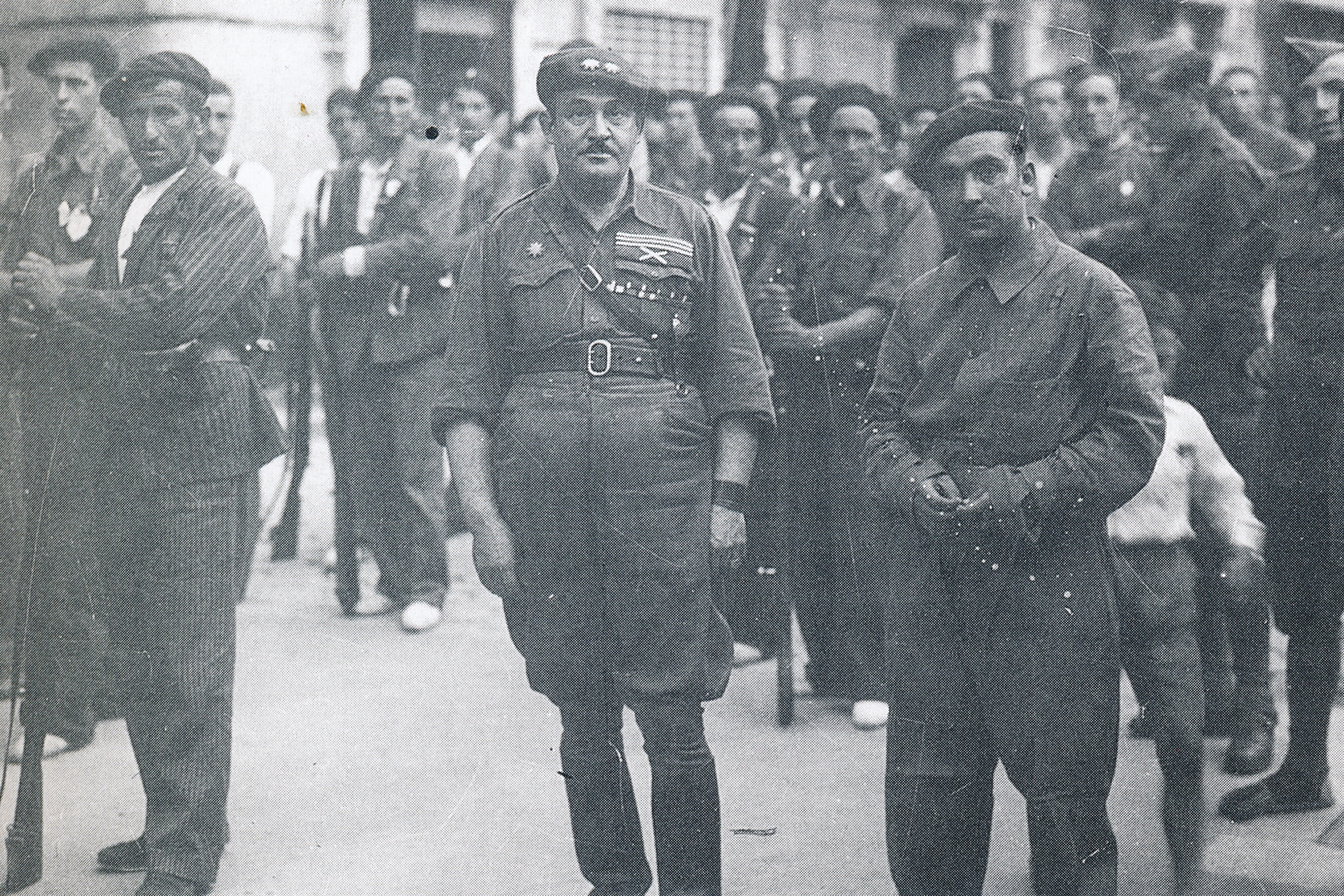
with Navarrese volunteers

During the first 4 days of insurgency Utrilla acted as head of Carlist regional general staff. He was busy mostly organizing the avalanche of volunteers, forming units, nominating commanders, deploying troops in specific directions and raising morale by delivering public addresses. Apart from Navarre, he helped to organize the rebellion also in the neighboring Álava. His crucial contribution, however, consisted of heading a 1,200-strong column of Navarrese requetés which on July 23 moved by train from Pamplona to Zaragoza. The convoy was organized as urgent emergency measure, since insurgents’ control over the Aragonese capital was extremely shaky. Utrilla enforced swift transport and then ensured rebel domination in the city; with Jesús Comín he was also the one who made the local rebel military commander, general Cabanellas, to replace the republican flag with the monarchist roja y gualda. In early August he handed over command of the requeté troops in Zaragoza, to honor the Carlist queen already named Tercio de María de las Nieves, and returned to Pamplona.

Utrilla spent most of August in Pamplona; on the last day of the month he left for the Gipuzkoan front. In early September he was back in combat since the Moroccan times of 1925; on approaches to Irún he commanded a heterogeneous unit which consisted of requetés, Falangists and soldiers, 6 companies in total. It formed part of so-called Columna Los Arcos and assaulted the fortified outpost of San Marcial; it overran Behovia on September 4. In mid-September he advocated shuttling some troops from Gipuzkoa to Aragón; following the seizure of San Sebastián, in mid-month he indeed led some of the requeté sub-units transferred East. He resumed command over Tercio María de las Nieves, most of it deployed on defensive positions along the Ebro. Utrilla remained in charge until November, when he handed over to José Medrano.

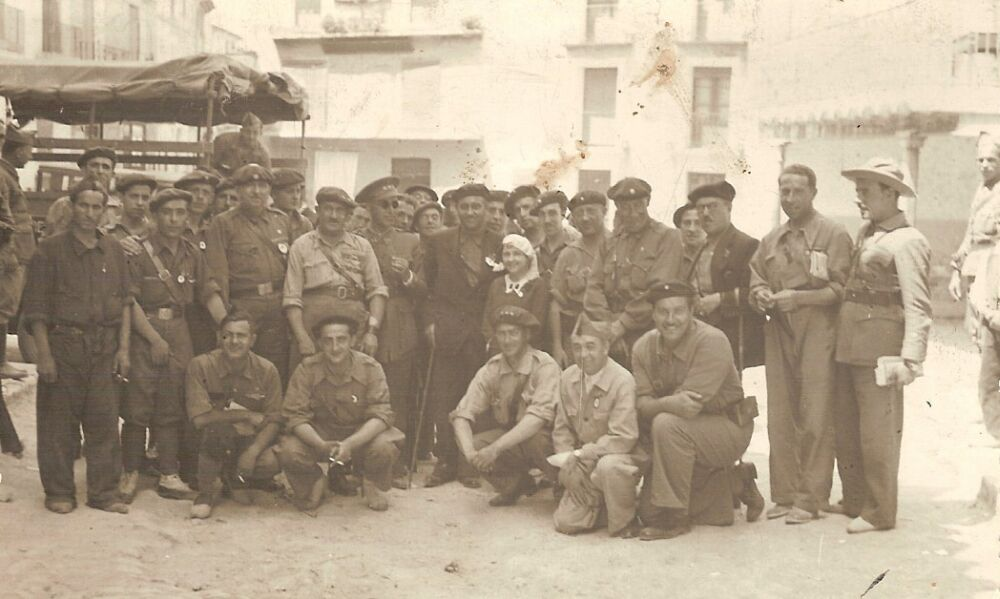
with requeté officers

Utrilla's whereabouts during the winter of 1936-1937 are not clear. In March 1937 he was listed in the official order of the Nationalist high command, already in the regular army service; as comandante retirado he was assigned to head Cuadro Eventual of the 6. Division, to be raised in Granada. His later service record is not known; a press note from late 1937 hailed his contribution to victorious Northern campaign, but provided no details. A contemporary historian speculates that Utrilla served in Jefatura de Milicias, the section of Nationalist general staff entrusted with organization of militia units, formally incorporated into the army but allowed a grade of autonomy. In June 1938 he was – again, following the annulled 1929 elevation – promoted to coronel de caballería. None of the sources consulted provides information on his assignment during final phases of the Civil War.

== Post-war military career ==
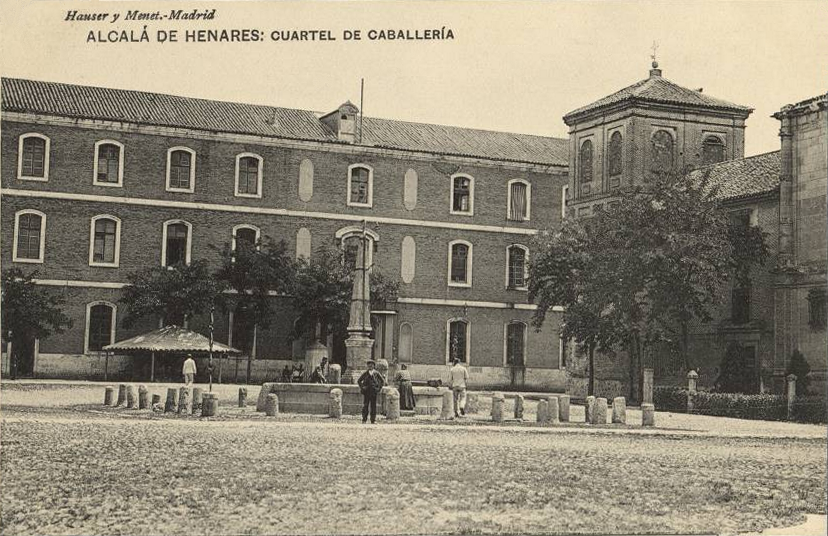
cavalry barracks, Alcalá de Henares

In the Francoist era Utrilla's military career consisted of spells at administrative positions, in command of large units and in the judiciary; hardly anyone of these lasted longer than 2 years. In September 1939 and as teniente coronel Utrilla received his first post-war nomination; he was to head 1. Brigada de Caballería, again in Alcalá de Henares. In 1940 he moved from the range of senior officers to generals, promoted to general de brigada; he remained in charge of the same cavalry unit in Alcalá. Following less than 2 year at this position, his regular garrison service was terminated and Utrilla obtained the first quasi-political nomination; in May 1941 he became the military governor of the Mallorca province. He performed the role slightly longer than 12 months; in June 1942 followed the appointment to commander of the 93. division, stationed at unclear location. During the official career path it was also the first moment Utrilla left cavalry – in the Spanish army there were no mounted units larger than brigade at the time – and assumed command of a combined-arms unit. He remained in charge throughout 1943 and at this role he was promoted to general de división. In 1944 he was not with the 93. any more, but his exact assignment is not clear. In April 1945 Utrilla resumed service as Gobernador Militar in the province of La Coruña, but the following year he was posted to command 42. division, also at unclear location. This proved to be his last role of commander of a large military unit.

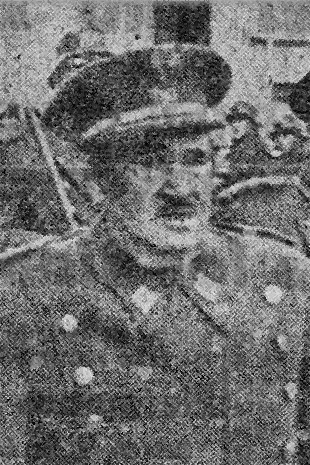
Utrilla, 1950s

In 1947 Utrilla was nominated consejero militar of Consejo Supremo de Justicia Militar, the highest army military tribunal. In 1948 he ceased at this role and for the third time assumed duties of the military governor, this time in the province of Valladolid; in addition, he was nominated sub-inspector of VII Región Militar, which covered León and part of Old Castile. Following a series of appointments lasting hardly longer than 12 months, these were the longest of his service assignments; in 1949 he was also personally admitted by Franco. Having served over 4 years in Valladolid, in 1952 Utrilla was again admitted at a personal audience by caudillo; at the same time he was promoted to teniente general and nominated Capitán General of the Baleares. In December 1953 he ceased in the Mediterranean and returned to Old Castile, though this time at the supreme role of commander of the VII Región Militár and head of Cuerpo de Ejército de Castilla VII, again with headquarters in Valladolid. It is not clear how long Utrilla remained at this position, though his service did not go beyond late 1955. At some point in the mid-1950s he moved to the semi-retired status of “a los ordenes de Ministro del Ejército”. In September 1959, having reached the upper limit of regular military retirement age, Utrilla left active service and as teniente general was released to reserve.

== Late Carlist engagements ==
Carlist standard

There is no information on direct Utrilla's activity in Traditionalist ranks during the first post-war years. However, it is known that he maintained his party links and within the limits permitted by the regime, he tried to cultivate the Carlist identity. During his assignment in Alcalá he found the time to attend the 1941 Holy Week festivities in Granada; they were highly saturated with the Traditionalist flavor, as detachments of requeté ex-combatants with flying standards paraded along the streets. The local Falange commander complained later the event turned into “una verdadera manifestación política” and that Utrilla, present at the honorary tribune, did not intervene and remained motionless during the “¡Vivan los leones del Requeté!” cries. During his Baleares service in 1942 the Falangists reported that Utrilla supported a separate, Carlist-only organization of Mártires de la Tradición feast, appeared in military uniform completed not with a peaked cap but the Carlist red beret, and intervened in favor of the Carlists detained later. In 1943 he was present at the Montserrat Aplec along party leaders like Fal, Zamanillo and Sivatte; in 1945 during a local event in Zaragoza he received honors from and greeted the marching requeté detachment; the day produced later a melee between the Carlists and the Falangists.

Utrilla's relations with the party hierarchy in the 1940s are not clear. According to one source in 1943 he was appointed to the national Carlist executive, Junta Nacional, but neither duration of the term nor any particular activity is known. He remained on correct terms with the regent-claimant, who in private correspondence lectured Utrilla on trappings of the Francoist “parodia del Monarquía” and warned him not to engage in the regime politically. However, at the turn of the 1940s and 1950s Utrilla was increasingly leaning towards the faction led by Sivatte, who criticized Don Javier for his alleged appeasement towards the dictatorship. When in the mid-1950s the Sivattistas left the Javierista Carlism and created a breakaway group known as RENACE, Utrilla was considered a member of its “núcleo privado”, though he refrained from public statements.

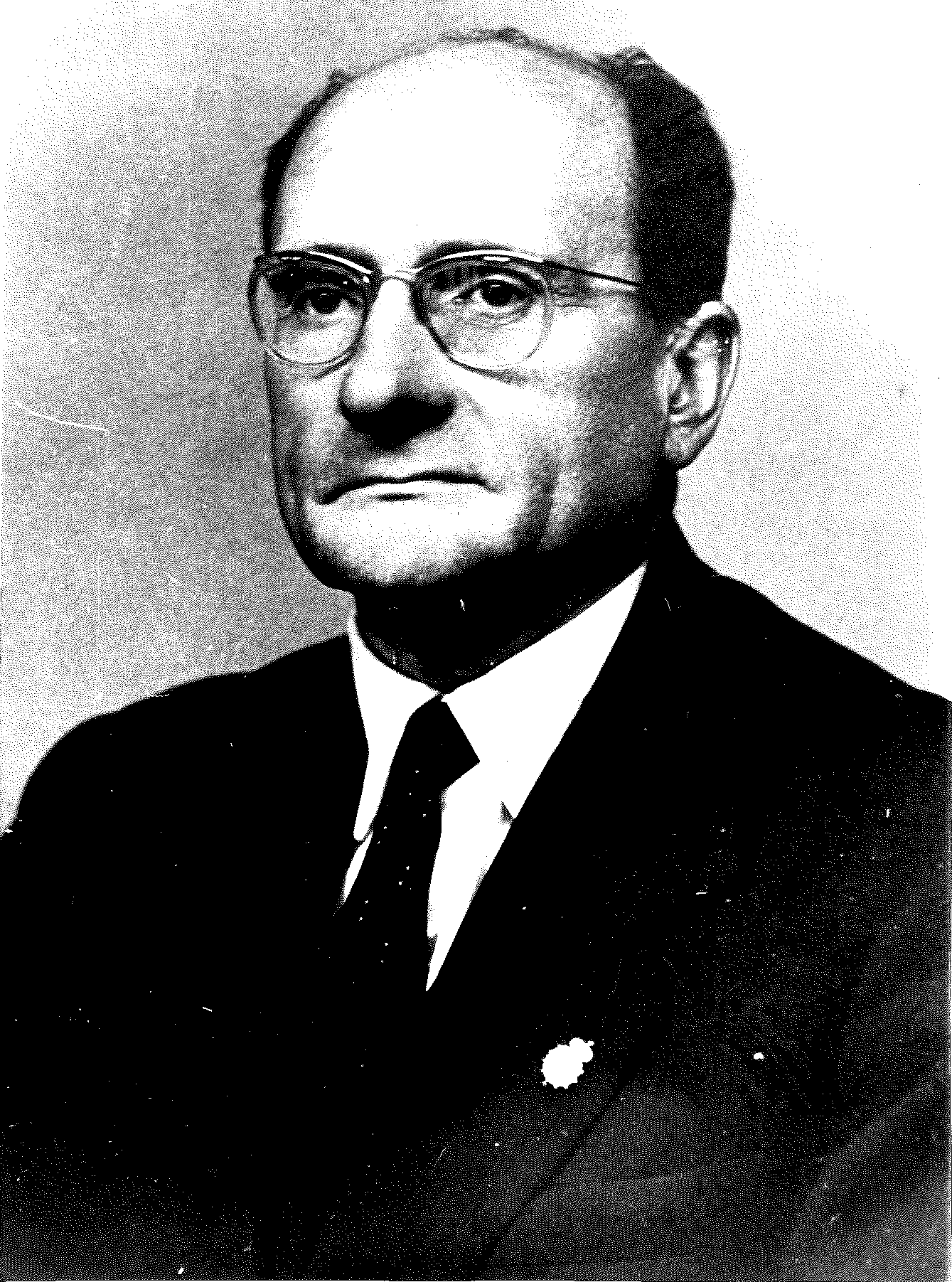
Sivatte

When half-retired Utrilla tried to attend the Sivattista Montserrat gatherings. One day prior to such a rally in 1959 he was courted by Capitán General de Barcelona, Pablo Martín Alonso, who offered him managerial position at a state-controlled metalworking and manufacturing company ENSIDESA, with a hefty salary package of 75,000 ptas a month included; in return Utrilla was supposed to refrain from quasi-political activity. He refused; the following day Utrilla – teniente general at the time - was detained by policía militar and driven to Alcalá la Real. Also afterwards he continued to sympathize with Sivattistas, though no longer in public. As late as in the early 1960s he believed that given decay of the Javierista current, RENACE was the only guardian of genuine Traditionalist values. He invited these which “pride themselves in being named Traditionalists or Carlists" to follow “the Regency of Estella, which today is the only legitimate Carlist authority".

== See also ==
- Maurici de Sivatte i de Bobadilla
- Carlo-francoism
