= Agustín Tellería Mendizábal =

Spanish politician

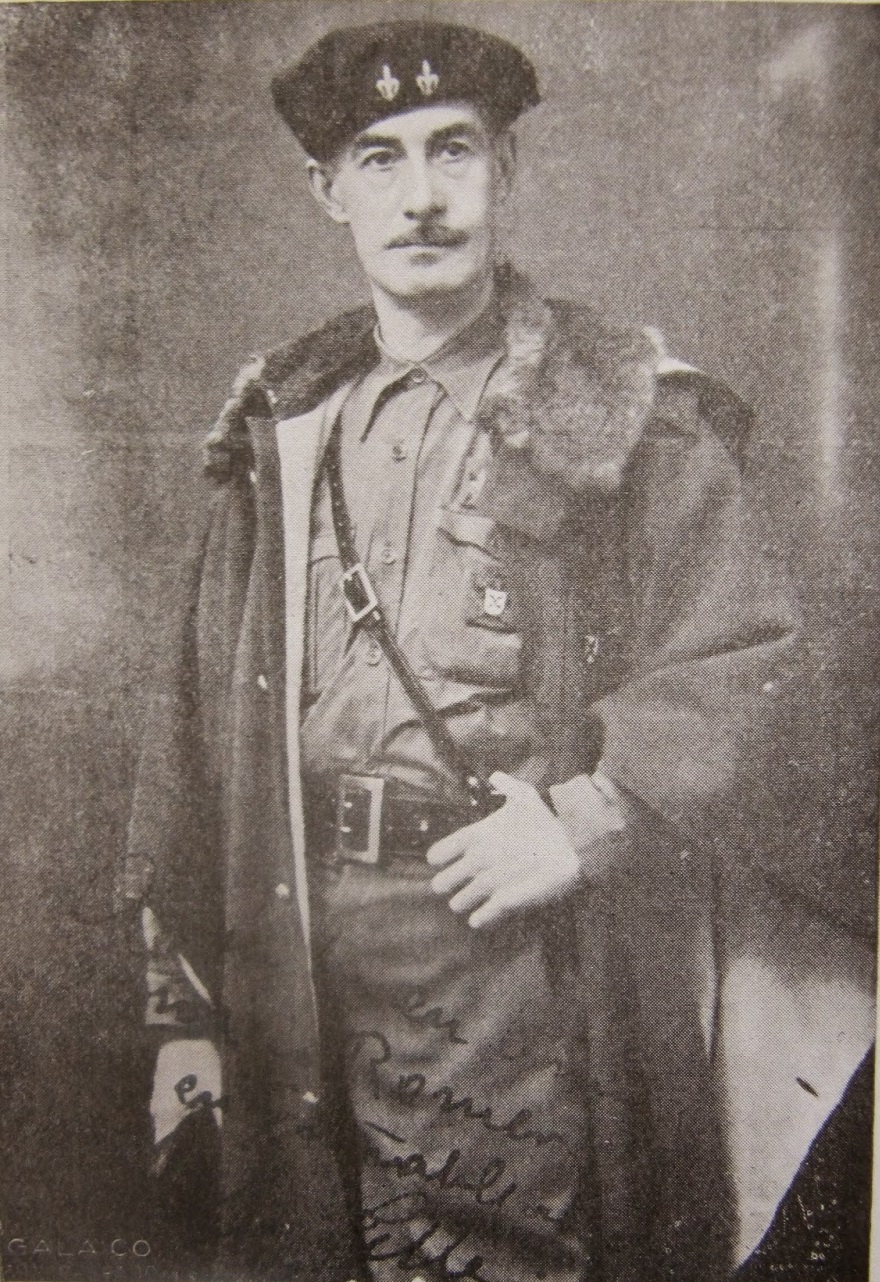
- Tellería Mendizábal in 1937
- Born: Agustín Tellería Mendizábal; March 1884; Antzuola, Spain
- Died: 24 March 1939 (aged 54/55); Vitoria-Gasteiz, Spain
- Occupation: Entrepreneur
- Known for: Conspirator, industrialist

Agustín Cándido Tellería Mendizábal (March 1884 – 24 March 1939) was a Spanish Basque politician and entrepreneur. Politically he supported the Traditionalist cause, mostly as a Carlist and for some time as a Mellista; since 1933 he was a member of the party provincial executive in Gipuzkoa. He is known chiefly as one of key people behind the anti-Republican conspiracy in the vasco-navarrese area in the spring of 1936; thanks to his position of a businessman and army supplier, he procured arms and munitions for the rebels. In 1937 he was for 5 months the provincial Gipuzkoan leader of the Francoist state party, the FET y de las JONS, but was shortly ousted as a zealous Carlist, non-compliant with the official regime ideology.

== Family and youth ==
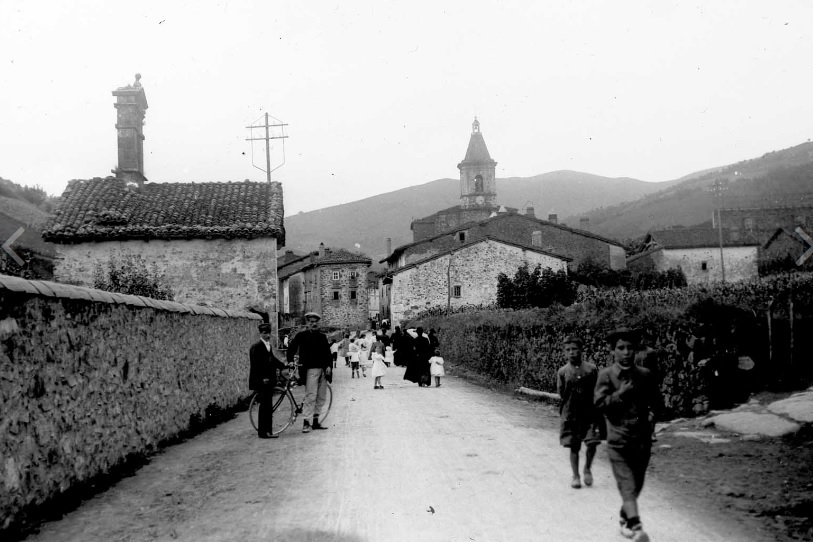
Antzuola, early 20th c.

The Basque family of Tellería was first noted in the Gipuzkoan county of Vergara in the 16th century and parish documents confirm their presence in the town of Antzuola since the early 18th century. The first direct ancestor of Agustín which can be traced is his strictly paternal great-grandfather Silvestre Antonio Tellería Ugalde, married to Clara Ignacia Lascurain Argarate and living in Antzuola in the early 19th century. His son and Agustín's paternal grandfather, Miguel Ignacio Telleria Lascurain (born 1807), married Maria Oyarzabal Idiazabal. None of the sources consulted provides any information on what they did for a living; the couple settled in their native town and had at least 9 children, born between 1833 and 1854. Their third son and Agustín's father, Jose Cipriano Telleria Oyarzabal (1849–1938), in 1877 married Micaela Ynurrita Gorosabel; the couple had 2 children, both daughters. Following early death of his wife in 1882, one year later Telleria Oyarzabal re-married with Maria Esteban Mendizábal Elgarresta (died 1913), a girl from the nearby village of Urretxu and descendant to a family which already had been related to the Tellerías.

The couple formed part of the local bourgeoisie. Since the late 18th century Antzuola, though a fairly small town, was a provincial tanning centre. Tellería Oyarzabal owned one of 4 manufactures operational in the municipality and developed it into the most successful one, with branches in other Gipuzkoan locations; it produced belts, footwear, holsters, saddles and other leather goods, mostly for the army. Agustín was born into considerable wealth; it is not clear whether apart from two half-sisters from the first marriage of his father he had any other siblings; sources do not mention any. It is neither known where he commenced education, whether he attended secondary school and whether he entered a university. Because he was later referred to as "farmacéutico" and because his father was running a chemistry-related business, it is likely that Tellería received some sort of chemical education, completed probably in the early 1900s.

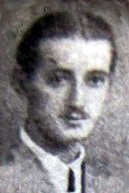
José Telleria Legorburu

At unspecified time prior to 1913 Tellería wed Maria Legorburu from the nearby Gabiria (died after 1959); close to nothing is known about her family, except that it was of distinguished noble past and that the families had already intermarried. The couple settled in Antzuola and had at least 10 children: Mercedes, Blanca, María Luisa, Vicente, Juan, José, José Joaquín, Agustín, Luis and Ignacio Tellería Legorburu. Like one of his uncles, José served as mayor of Antzuola; he was killed as requeté in 1937. Juan and José Joaquín entered a religious order. The only one who became sort of a public figure was Ignacio, a well-recognized Madrid physician. Among Agustín's grandchildren the best known is the Tellería Chávarri branch. Isabel as a child briefly became a movie star with her role in El espiritú de la colmena (1973), which turned out to have been her only film. Her sister Alicia is a movie production manager, while María is spokesperson for EU-related human-rights organizations and author.

== From Carlista to Mellista ==
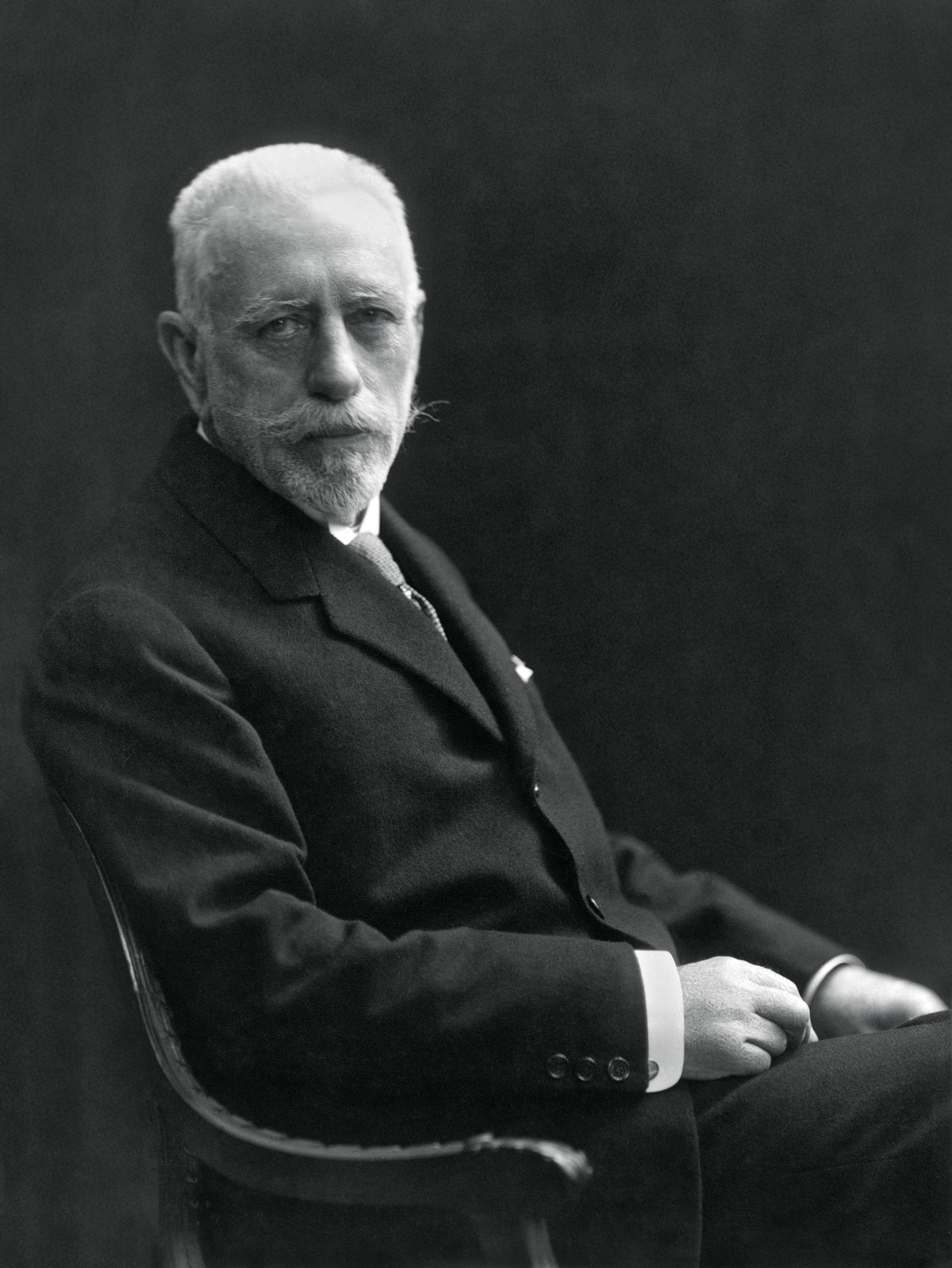
Tirso Olazábal

The Tellería family was of Carlist political sympathies; Agustín's father served as officer in the legitimist ranks during the Third Carlist War, and also following defeat he remained a "modelo de perseverancia en el defensa de un ideal". Agustín inherited the Traditionalist outlook. Together with the entire family in 1905 he co-signed a homage message, directed to the Pope Pius X and protesting alleged masonic manipulations in France. In the mid-1900s he engaged in the Carlist youth organisation and over time grew to president of the Tolosa branch of Juventud Carlista; it is not clear why he was not active in his native Vergara arm of the structures. In 1908 he was already mingling with party executives in Gipuzkoa, e.g. he entered the committee headed by the provincial jefé Tirso de Olazabal and entrusted with organizing a grand regional Traditionalist rally in Zumarraga. Also in the early 1910s Tellería was noted in the press for various protests in defense of religion and aimed against perceived blasphemous initiatives and incidents.

In the late 1910s Tellería was not recorded either in Traditionalist or religious organizations, and studies on Carlism of the era do not mention his name. At that time the movement was increasingly fragmented due to a conflict between the key theorist, Juan Vázquez de Mella, and the claimant Don Jaime. Most of the Gipuzkoan party leaders tended to side with the former, who advocated a grand ultra-right alliance with dynastic threads played down; Tellería followed the same path. When the crisis erupted during a showdown of early 1919, he joined the rebels – to be known as Mellistas – and broke away. In late 1919 he agreed to represent the emerging new grouping in the race to the Cortes, and was officially reported as standing in the election campaign from the district of San Sebastián. It is not clear whether he eventually withdrew or was defeated, as none of the press titles of the era provided details on the number of votes he could have gathered.

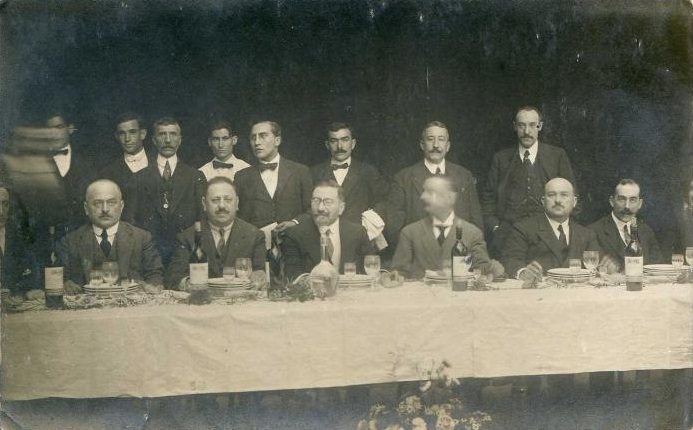
Mellista meeting, around 1920

In the early 1920s the Mellistas tried to build their own organisation, but the process went on slowly with many defections along the way. Tellería was not among the disillusioned. As late as in mid-1923 he was touring Gipuzkoa and spoke at party rallies. He counted among most-recognized provincial party leaders, along Víctor Pradera, Marcelino Oreja and Antonio Pagoaga. Nonetheless, the Primo de Rivera coup brought political life in Spain to the standstill. It seems that Tellería's party activity ceased; if referred in the press in the mid- and late 1920s, it is only on social columns or in sporting sections, noted as sponsor of rowing teams. He might have been involved in running the family tanning company, especially that his father was already a septuagenarian. However, it is more likely that he engaged in pharmaceutical business, as he was soon to be known as "farmacéutico"; this reference is invoked also in present-day historiographic scientific works, yet it is not clear what it exactly stands for.

== From Mellista to Carlista ==
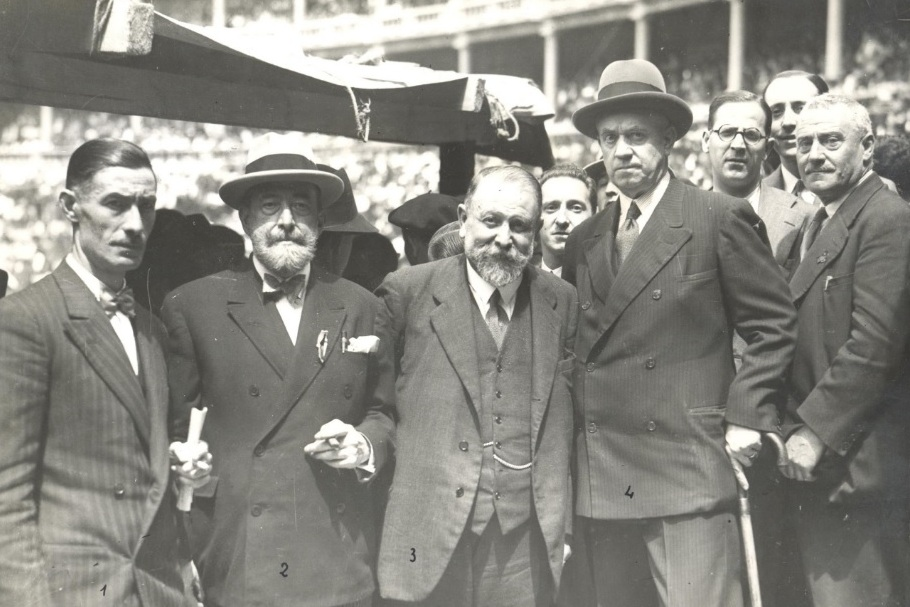
Telleria (1fL) with Carlist politicians, Pamplona 1931

Following the fall of Primo, Tellería resumed political activity, from the onset oriented towards re-unification of Traditionalist factions: the Jaimistas, the Integristas, and the Mellistas. In early 1930 he animated an assembly in San Sebastián, which called for unity; his voice was heard on the other end of Spain, as in March the new Andalusian Integrist leader Manuel Fal Conde mentioned the San Sebastián session when launched his own call for "unidad del Tradicionalismo español". Late in 1930 the Mellista círculo of Antzuola declared that "it was not a procedural matter which separated us from Don Jaime, but rather the question of program ... Time has shown that there was no [Jaimist] attack on Traditionalist principles, which obliges us to re-enter the Jaimist party". In April 1931, two weeks following birth of the Republic, Tellería signed a joint manifesto calling for a common vasco-navarrese representation, aiming for "reivindicación de nuestras libertades y reconocimíento de nuestra personalidad historica"; other signatories included other traditionalists like Antonio Pagoaga, Julián Elorza, marqués de Las Hormazas and the Baleztena brothers, though there was no Basque nationalist who co-signed. Later during the year he represented the Gipuzkoan Mellistas during a common rally in Pamplona, campaigned with the "Jaungoikoa eta Foruak" slogan and took part in Traditionalist feasts.

In January 1932, Tellería was among key speakers at the grand rally in Pamplona, where re-unification was officially declared. Within the organisation, named Comunión Tradicionalista, Tellería entered the Gipuzkoan executive as representative of the comarca of Vergara. He entered also the broad, 50-member national executive body; as "jefe militar de Vascongadas, Navarra y Rioja" he was responsible for buildup of the Carlist paramilitary organization requeté in the key, vasco-navarrese area. The press reported his frenetic propaganda activity, at times also beyond Gipuzkoa and even beyond Vascongadas, though his paramilitary tasks were carried out in the shadow. However, there were some doubts as to his efficiency. At one point in 1933 the unofficial co-ordinator of nationwide requeté structures, colonel José Varela, relieved Tellería of his duties in Navarre, where Ignacio Baleztena took over.

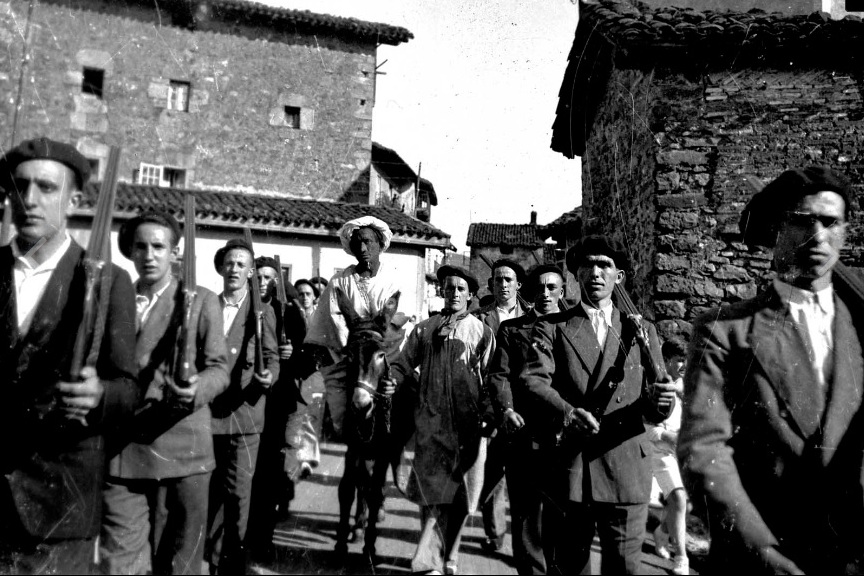
Antzuola, mid-1930s

In October 1933 Tellería entered Junta Provincial, the Gipuzkoan party executive. Apart from the usual propaganda activities, in 1933 he stood in the province as a Traditionalist candidate for the Cortes; though his 27,614 votes made a decent showing, he failed to make it to the parliament. In 1934–1935 he kept going with his usual duties, at times speaking to large crowds, and writing single pieces to Traditionalist periodicals. In the national party executive, split between cautious followers of the former leader conde Rodezno and adamant supporters of the new jefé Fal Conde, he sided with the latter. While some grumbled about Fal's iron hand, Tellería publicly supported his stress on "disciplinia y lealtad".

== Conspirator ==
Carlist standard

Following the electoral triumph of Popular Front in February 1936 the Carlists were already set towards a violent overthrow of the republican regime. However, the party executive was divided over the strategy to be adopted: Fal and his followers were gearing up for a stand-alone, exclusive Carlist rising, while another group preferred to join the military when they decide to move. Tellería was firmly with the former. Though he held some very vague preliminary talks with PNV on their participation in the plot, his key task was securing the military logistics. As at the time he already owned the family tanning business and was recognized as "hombre de gran solvencia industrial en Guipúzcoa", he was well suited for the role. As early as in March he engineered a hoax, which sent metalworking products ordered for a bogus Bilbao customer shipped to Belgium, while 17 cases with hundreds of pistols and rifles, produced in the same Eibar plant and destined for Belgium, were delivered to Bilbao. As the Carlist plan envisioned that at one point volunteers disguised as Guardia Civil would take control of key ministry offices in Madrid, Tellería took care of getting the uniforms ready. Also in early March and as official supplier of leather products for the army, he managed to get hundreds of benemerita uniforms, produced on his order in Zaragoza, to be delivered to a Carlist depot in Madrid. The republican security services got wind of the plan and stepped in; it did not take them long to identify Tellería as the key man behind the scheme. He was arrested either in May or in early June; the Carlist plan had to be abandoned.

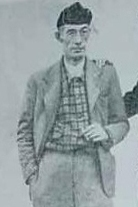
Tellería as CNT militiaman

Following some shuttling between the arrests in Pamplona and Zaragoza, in late June Tellería was transferred to the Dirección General de Seguridad arrest in Madrid. He claimed non-guilty and maintained that he believed the uniforms were intended for Spanish units in Africa. Moved to the Modelo prison, it is there where he witnessed the July coup. He survived the deadly fire of the prison of August 22–24 and then numerous repeated militia raids, usually ending with extraction of political prisoners and their ultimate execution. When facing a makeshift revolutionary tribunal he posed as a Basque nationalist guilty of petty crimes. The strategy apparently worked, as in late August he was set free. He spent the next 3 months hiding at various friends and relatives in Madrid. He assumed a false identity, made friends with some CNT militiamen, started to pose as one of them and – according to his own account – has even penetrated into their offices. In early November he managed to arrange a travel to Valencia to obtain a passport, which in turn would enable him to return to Vascongadas. The plan worked out and under the name of Múgica Tellería legally crossed to France. He took the train to Saint-Jean-de-Luz, where he saw the Carlist regent, and by mid-November he returned to Antzuola, since late September controlled by the Carlists.

== Between Carlism and Francoism ==
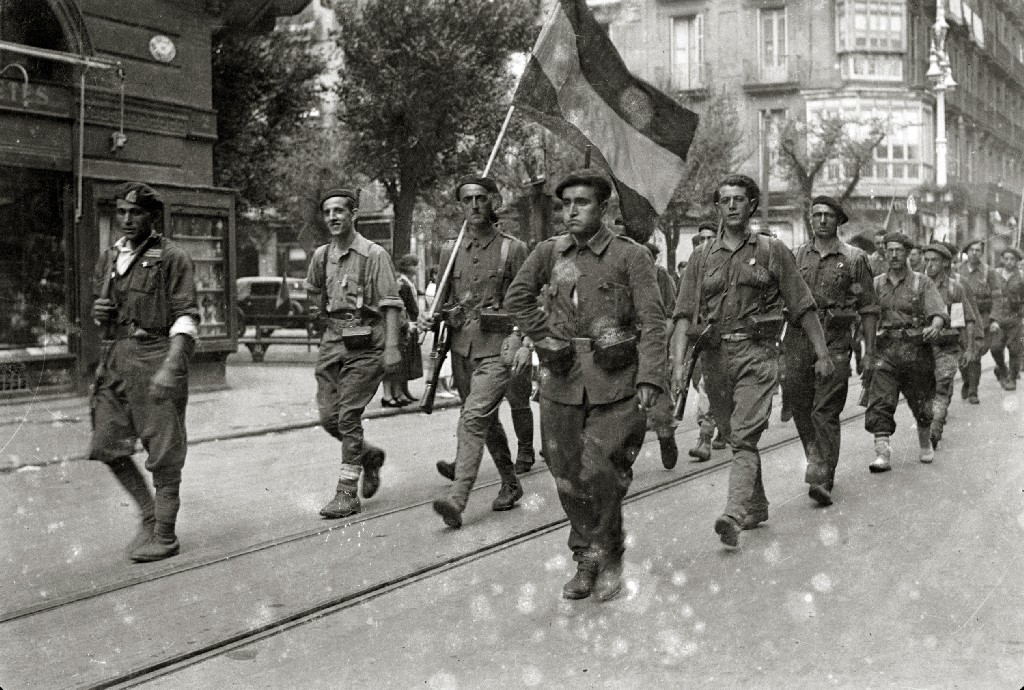
requeté in San Sebastián, 1936

In December 1936 the Fal-led Junta Nacional Carlista de Guerra, the war-time party executive, nominated Tellería one of 2 "inspectores jefe de servicio", part of the infrastructure supposed to launch the Carlist-only Real Academia Militar de Requetés. He resumed also his pre-war position of the provincial Gipuzkoan party leader. The family Antzuola factory was now working for the Nationalist war machine and in early 1937 he published account of his days in the Republican zone as a booklet, El milagro de Agustín Tellería. De miliciano rojo a soldado de la España Imperial. In March 1937 the Republican court in Bilbao in course of formal proceedings declared Tellería guilty of rebellion and sentenced him to prison; the same ruling was applied to his son, one month earlier killed in action.

Tellería's position towards mounting Franco's pressure for Carlist unification with Falange is not entirely clear. One scholar classified him as "carlista posibilista". However, in late March 1937, during heated internal debates within Carlism, Tellería seemed to side with the intransigent Falcondistas. In course of one of key meetings in Burgos he questioned the legality of Consejo de la Tradición, a body formed by the Rodeznistas as part of their strategy to overpower Fal. Shortly after declaration of the forced unification and watching a joint Carlist-Falangist juvenile parade in San Sebastián, he remarked: "this is shameful. This is intolerable. What is this all about? Tomorrow I go to Salamanca to speak to Rodezno". He did, and returned excited; he got convinced that the arrested Hedilla conspired against Franco, that with marginalisation of Falange "the moment is ours, entirely ours", and that the Carlists should seize it and align with the military. This is what he wholeheartedly recommended to the regent, Don Javier.

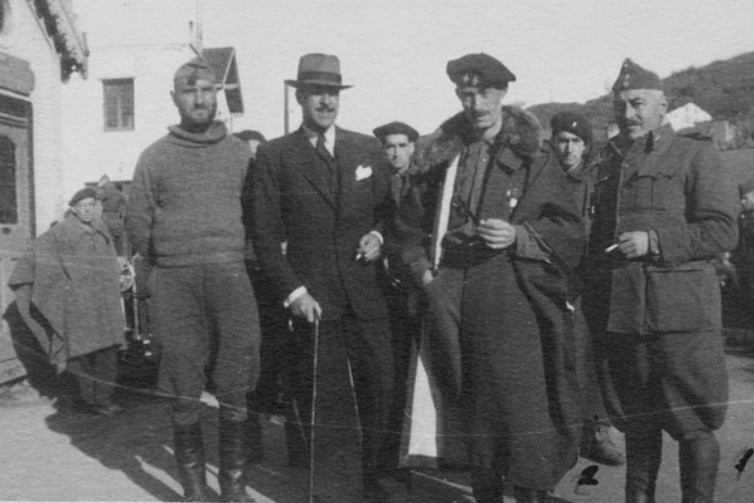
Tellería on the Northern Front, outskirts of Vergara, 1937

In late April 1937 Tellería was nominated the first provincial Gipuzkoan jefe of the unified Falange Española Tradicionalista. At this role he tried to ignore the Falangists, to pay due respect to the army and to advance Traditionalism as the political cause; when leading preparations to the first anniversary of Nationalist troops taking San Sebastián, he tried to format the gala as an exalted Carlist spectacle. Since alarm signals were sent to Burgos, an "inspector nacional" and "inspector general" of FET arrived at San Sebastián and investigated; in early September Tellería was promptly dismissed, before the anniversary celebrations took place. However, Tellería did not fall out of grace entirely. In October he was allowed a radio speech, already as ex-delegado, and in early 1938 he was confirmed by the military as "inspector de las comisarías de Requetés", now formally under the army command. Little is known of activity at this role. On March 20, 1939, he lost control over his car on a slippery, poorly maintained road in Betoño, near Vitoria; he survived the crash, but perished the following day in a hospital. The funeral was attended by Rodezno, civil and military governors, president of the Alavese diputación and the mayor of San Sebastián.
