= Xibeca =

Spanish beer brand

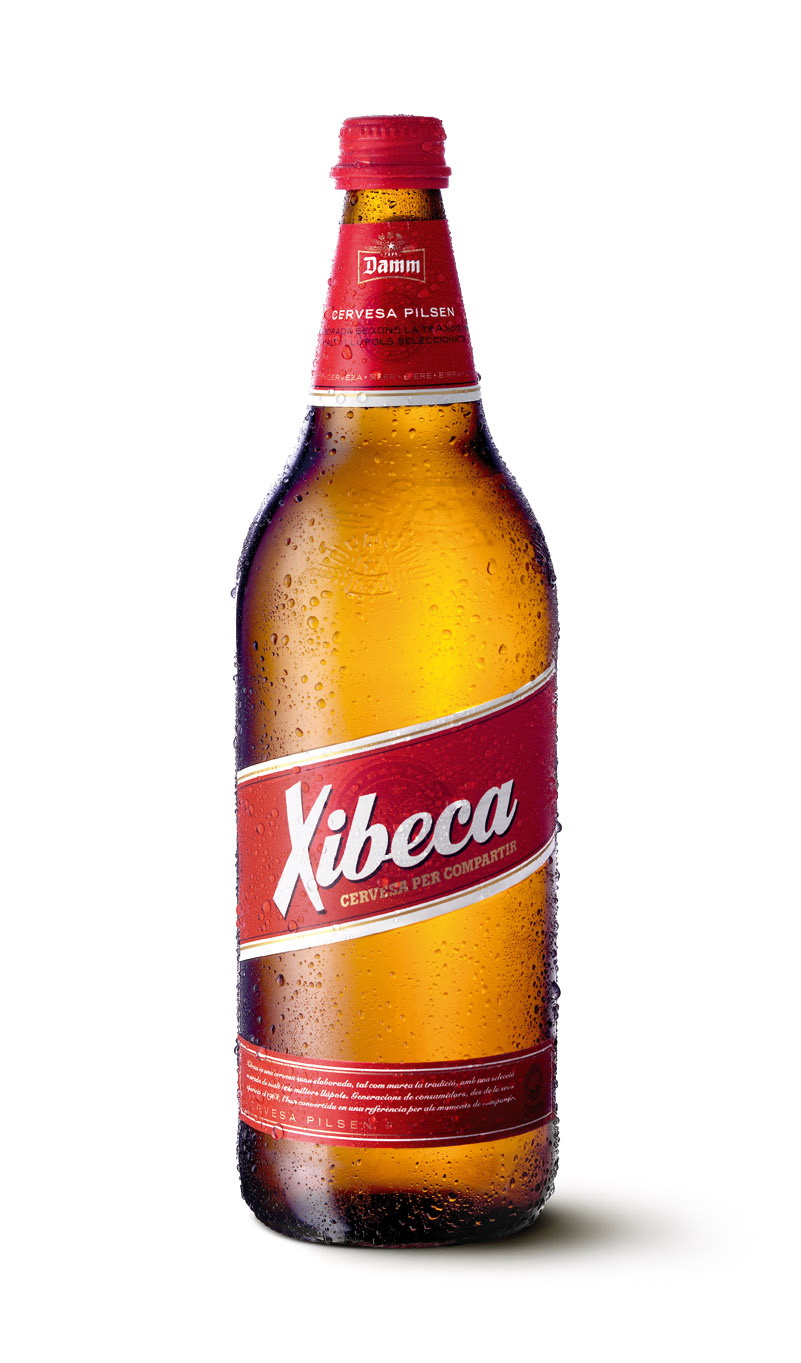
Xibeca: 1-litre bottle

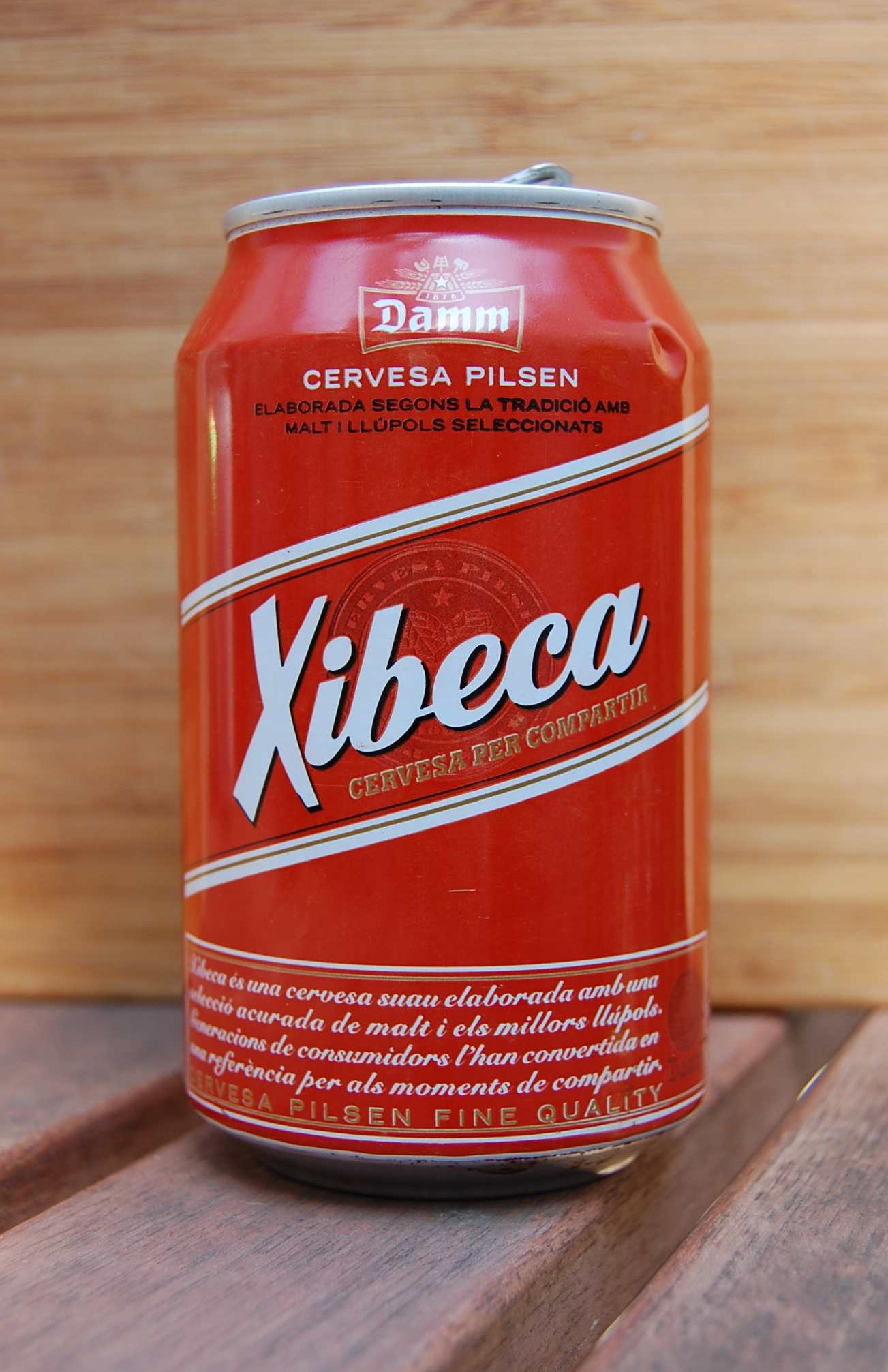
A can of Xibeca beer

Xibeca or Xibeca-Damm, is a Spanish beer brand of Barcelona brewery S.A. Damm, produced and mostly sold in its home Catalan market.

It is a low-alcohol grade, pale lager-style, table beer coming in large one-liter bottles. "Xibeca" was meant to be consumed along with meals, as a cheap substitute for red table wine when the prices of table wines rose at the end of the 1960s. It was very popular among the low-middle class in Catalonia during the 1970s.

Damm is one of the main breweries in Barcelona. During the heyday of baseball in Spain in the 1950s and 1960s, S.A. Damm sponsored a local baseball team, Picadero Damm.

Other Damm products include Estrella Damm and Voll-Damm.

== Bibliography ==
- Xibeca at the Damm site (in English)
- Beer Rate
