= Ramón Massó Tarruella =

Spanish media and communications expert

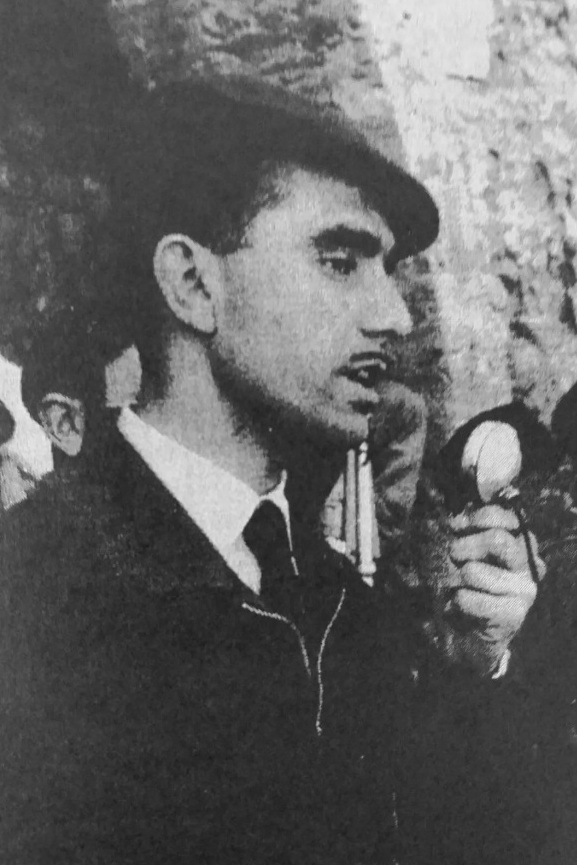
- Born: Ramón Massó Tarruella; 1928; Pallejà, Spain
- Died: 2017 (aged 88–89); Barcelona
- Occupations: Scholar, entrepreneur
- Known for: Media expert, politician
- Political party: Carlism

Ramón Massó Tarruella (1928–2017) was a Spanish media and communications expert, known also for his role in Carlism of the 1960s. He gained nationwide recognition in the 1970s and 1980s, when as academic, theorist and brand communications specialist he published numerous books and co-ran a media agency. In historiography he is moderately recognized for his role in politics of mid-Francoism. He was leading the group of young Carlist activists who challenged the Traditionalists and eventually ensured domination of the progressist current. However, his bid to promote Prince Carlos Hugo as a future monarch and as an alternative to prince Juan Carlos failed.

== Family and youth ==
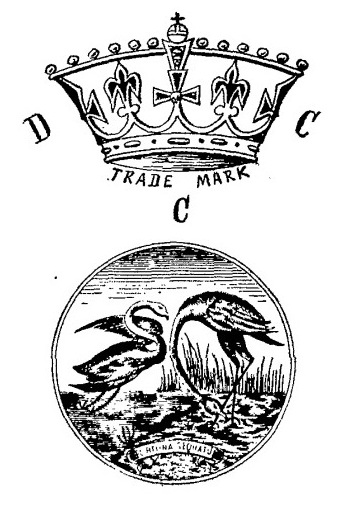
Massó early trademarks

Massó descended from a well-to-do Catalan bourgeoisie family. His grandfather Ramón Massó Marcer (died 1936) originated from Sant Pere de Ribes. In 1885, during rapid expansion of the Catalan textile industry, he moved to Barcelona to set up his own business. He started a company which specialized in production of textile dyes; fairly successful, in 1902 it was turned into R. Massó y Cía, Sociedad Colectiva. His son, Juan Massó Soler (died 1975), developed the business into a diversified chemical company. Massó Soler also owned real estate in the then suburban Barcelona zone of Pedralbes. He was member of many Catalan commercial and trade institutions. At unspecified time, though probably in the mid-1920s, he married Nuria Tarruella Riu; the couple lived in Pedralbes, in the late 1930s moving into a luxury mansion at Avenida Pearson.

Juan and Nuria had 8 children, 3 sons and 5 daughters, all raised in deeply Catholic and moderately conservative ambience. For barely 2 years Ramón frequented Colegio Nelly in Barcelona. Following outbreak of the civil war and thanks to a huge bribe, the Massó family was allowed to leave the revolution-engulfed Catalonia and made it to the Nationalist zone; they settled in San Sebastián. After the end of hostilities the family returned to Barcelona, where Massó Soler resumed his chemical business. Ramón resumed education in a Jesuit college in Sarrià, where he obtained baccalaureate in 1945. Diagnosed with tuberculosis, he spent 1946-1947 mostly in sanatoria. In 1948 he entered Opus Dei and until 1949 was undergoing its formative courses in Seville and Cádiz. He commenced law in Barcelona, but in 1951 was called to military service. When released he abandoned law, moved to Madrid and enrolled at Filosofia y Letras in Central. He got a degree in philosophy with a thesis on "temas pedagógicos de innovación educativa"; the year of Massó's graduation is not clear, though it was likely 1954. In the mid-1950s he moved to Bilbao to commence teaching at Colegio Gaztelueta, a school founded few years earlier by Opus Dei and the local high bourgeoisie of Getxo.

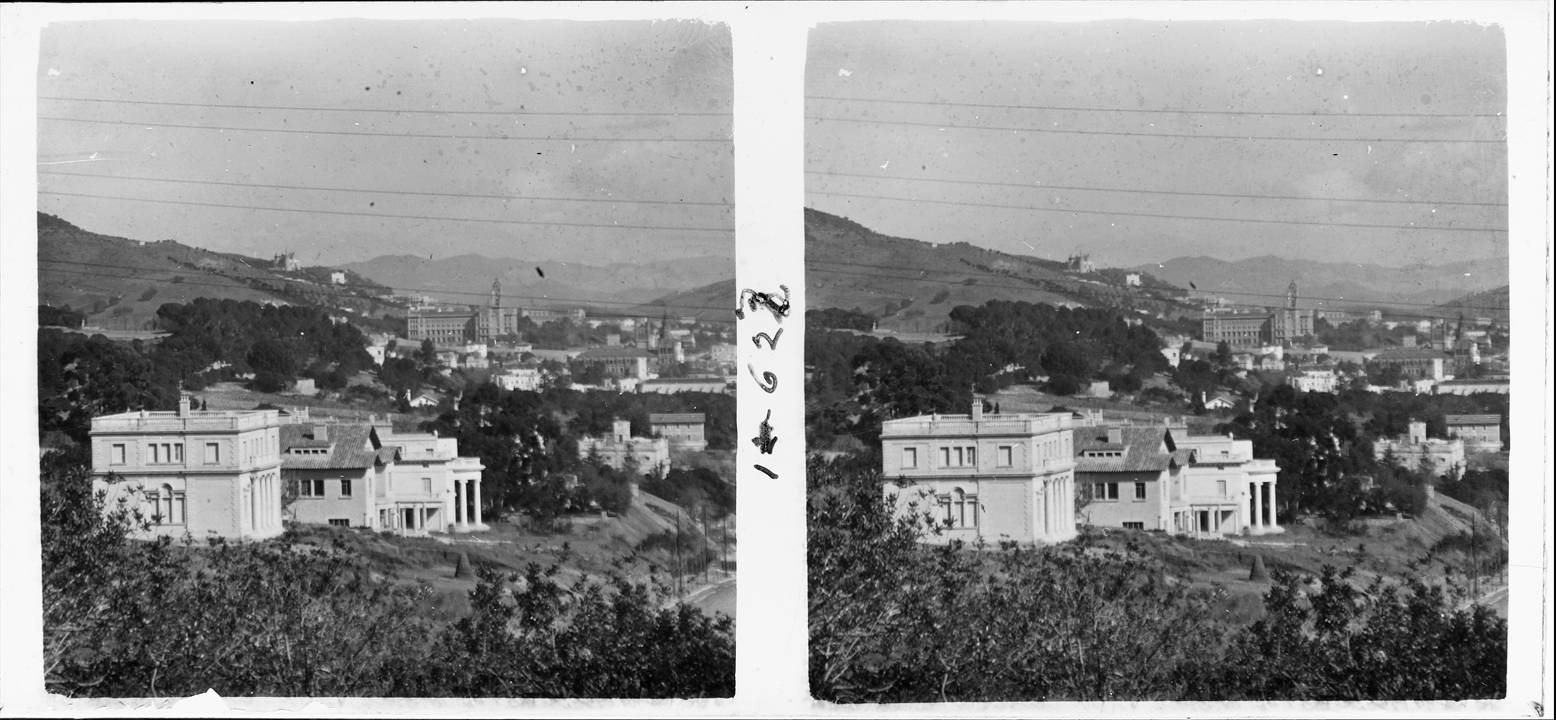
Pedralbes, 1920s

In 1968 Massó married Carmen Bigas Rovira, a woman from another Catalan high-bourgeoisie family; the couple had no children. His brothers José Luis and Juan Antonio joined the family company. In the 1960s José Luis, acting as co-owner and CEO, turned it into Comercial Química Massó Sociedad Anónima, which remains active until today; he was also known as engaged in the Barcelona football club, RCD Español. The youngest brother Juan Antonio left the world of business and commenced studying canon law; he was ordained as a priest in 1965. Following his transfer to Australia he later became the Regional Vicar of Opus Dei, the position retained until his death. Another known Massó's relative was his distant paternal uncle, Ramón Oliveras Massó; in the early 1930s he was director of the Barcelona-based Escuela de Ingenieros Industriales and taught there until 1936.

== Early Carlist engagements (until 1955) ==
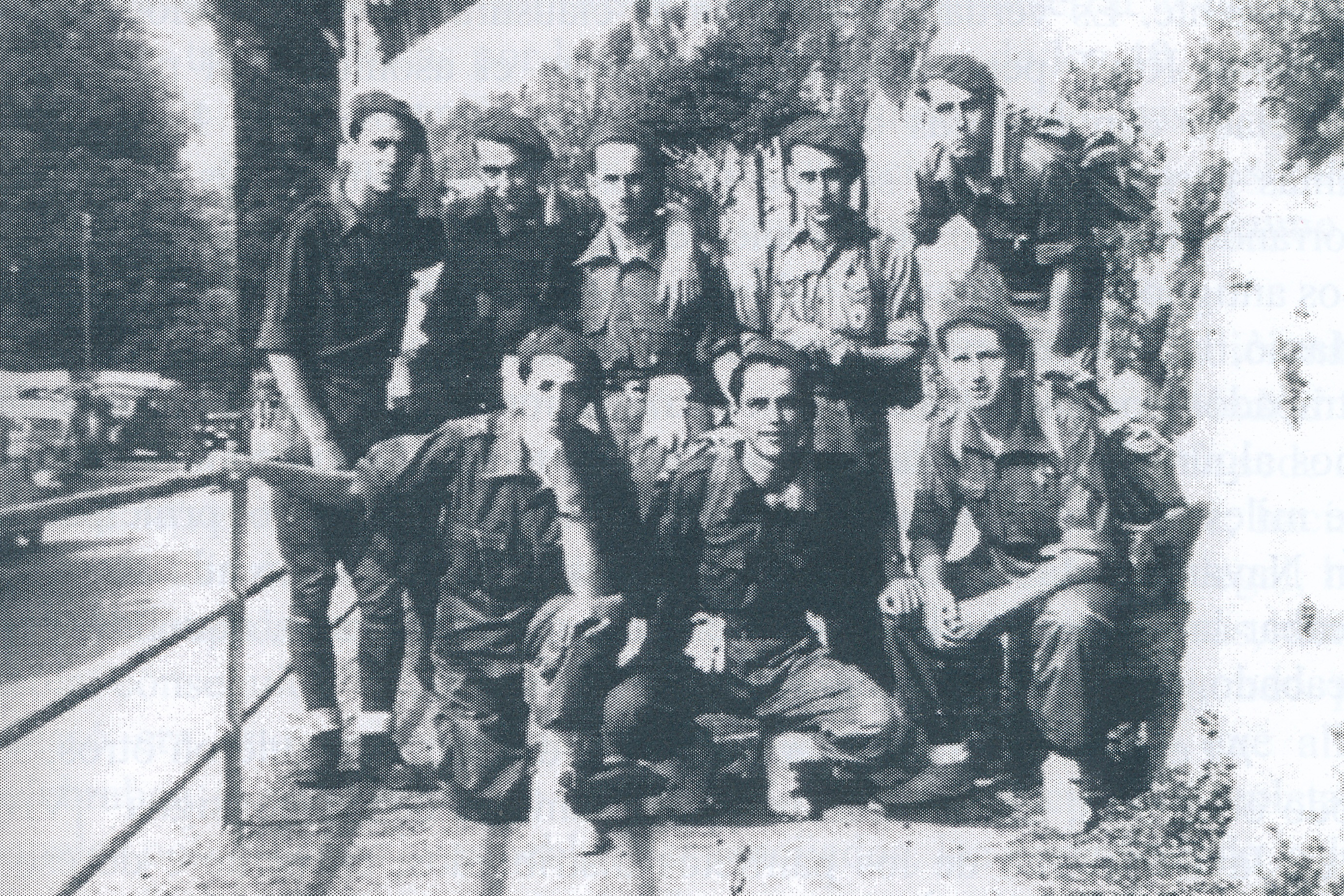
Massó in Montserrat, 1945

Massó's father politically was related to moderate Catalanist conservatism and held minor posts in Lliga Regionalista. Later in Francoist Spain he approached and possibly even joined Carlism, but until the civil war there were no Carlist "antecedentes familiares". Hence, it was mostly by accident that Ramón, at the time a 9-year-old, during the wartime exile years in San Sebastián joined the Carlist juvenile organisation, Pelayos. When in aftermath of political Francoist amalgamation it was merged with the Falangist youth branch Flechas Massó withdrew. As a boy he took part in the 1937 anti-unification demonstrations, shouting "death tto Franco" and "death to Falange". Having returned to Barcelona he remained active in informal Carlist youth structures and attended Carlist rallies; according to his own later account it was during the 1945 Montserrat aplec that he became determined to act whatever it takes.

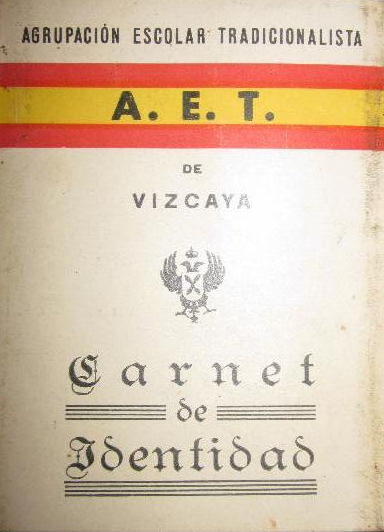
AET id card

During his academic years in the early 1950s Massó found himself part of a wave of young Carlist students, active in Madrid. They were increasingly irritated by what they perceived as complacent, somnabulic atmosphere of Carlist círculos. He was neither impressed by theoretical works by Traditionalist pundits like Rafael Gambra, which he found intellectually refined, but of little practical value. He was rather fascinated by José Ortega y Gasset and his vision of politics as action; he formatted his Carlist vision as activism pushing the limits of what was possible. He did not attend courses of the Carlist Academia Vázquez de Mella, though he joined Agrupación de Estudiantes Tradicionalistas, a technically illegal though tolerated Carlist student organization.

Enraged by increasing marginalization of Carlism within Francoist Spain, Massó developed his childish anti-Falangist sentiments into a firm anti-Francoist outlook. In the early 1950s together with other AET activists he engaged in leafleting campaigns against Sindicato Español Universitario, the official and the only legal academic organisation; he took part also in rallies and minor skirmishes against the SEU members, which eventually produced dismissal of the SEU president, Jorge Jordana de Fuentes. In 1952 for the first time he had the opportunity to meet the Carlist claimant Don Javier; Massó took part in a banquet which accompanied the Eucharistic Congress in Barcelona, where the pretender made some political declarations. He gradually emerged among the Madrid AET leaders. In 1954 (according to some sources in 1955) the Carlist political leader, Manuel Fal Conde, nominated him Delegado Nacional de la AET, the leader of the organisation.

== Launch of Carlos Hugo (1956-1961) ==
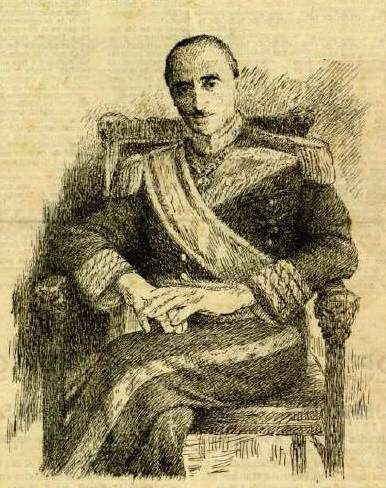
Don Javier, 1950s

In the mid-1950s Massó served as a link between AET members in Bilbao and Madrid. Disturbed by rumors of possible reconciliation between the Alfonsist and Carlist claimants, in early 1956 they met Don Javier en transit in Bilbao; during extremely emotional encounter they tried to dissuade him from a dynastical union. At the 1956 annual Montejurra rally Massó as AET representative spoke for the first time, and against somewhat reserved and vague monarchism of the likes of Zubiaur, he openly hailed "Rey Javier". However, disappointed with claimant's ambiguity, the Massó-led aetistas have already decided to focus on his eldest son Hugues, with whom the group found common ground during his earlier brief stay in Madrid. Settled in Bilbao, since late 1956 the prince was being introduced to Carlism by the Massó-led team until he made a public debut during the annual Montejurra amassment in 1957. The entry, repeatedly rehearsed, meticulously planned and pre-agreed with the Carlist leadership, turned out to be a masterpiece of public appearance. Massó and his team ensured that La Proclama de Montejurra gets propagated in Carlist circulos across Spain.

The address of prince Hugues sounded like an offer to Franco. Massó crafted it as part of "colaboracionismo táctico", a strategy of ill-willed collaboration with Francoism in order to gain room for further action; it was opposed to "colaboracionismo puro", promoted since the mid-1950s by the new Carlist leader, Valiente, who sincerely hoped for some sort of prudent partnership between Francoism and Carlism. However, the fiercely anti-Francoist AET rank-and-file did not distinguish between such subtleties and in late 1957 Massó was deposed from leadership of the organisation. Nonetheless, he continued along the same path; during the 1958 Montejurra in another Massó-written address Hugues reiterated vaguely pro-Francoist themes, combined with focus on social issues. The same year the prince asked Massó to settle in Paris and run his future political secretariat, the proposal he declined.

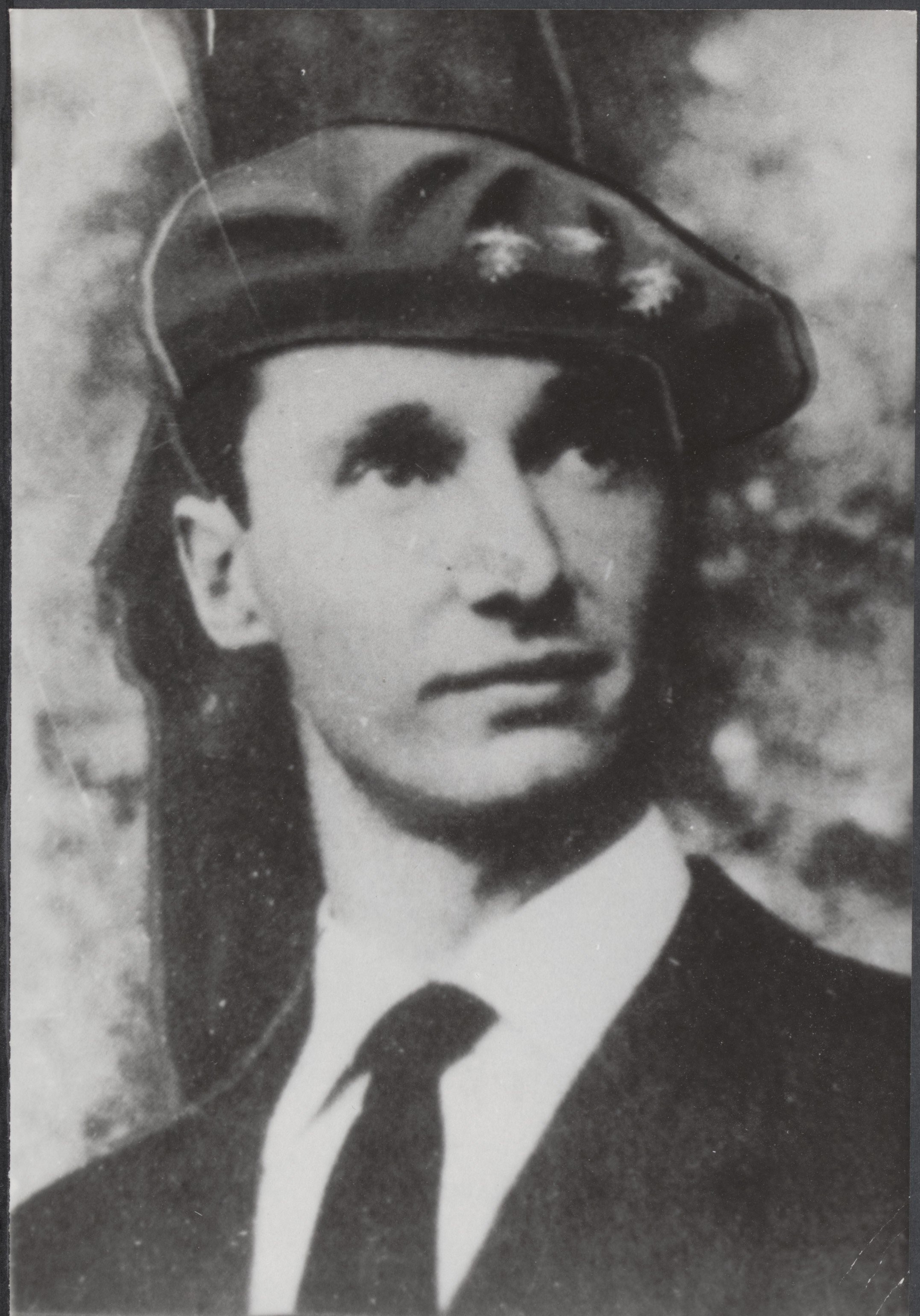
prince Hugues, 1950s

During the AET congress in 1959 Massó advocated his strategy of limited collaboration, enveloped in a vision of renovated, socially sensitive Carlism; it failed to get him a place in the executive. He shifted attention from AET to building a following for prince Hugues, with ambitious plan of "intentar la conquista del Estado" in the background. At the turn of the decades he took place and organized numerous public Traditionalist acts mobilizing support, including address at the 1960 Montejurra or lecture during Semana Nacional de Estudios the same year. He was also behind the action of re-positioning prince Hugues as "Carlos Hugo", with reference to iconic Carlist name. He convinced the prince to settle permanently in Madrid; the latter still wanted him to head his secretaría política, but because of opposition on part of his Opus Dei superiors, Massó initially declined. It was only in 1961 that the prince took up residence in the capital; Massó quit his job in Bilbao, also moved to Madrid and as secretario particular he became "sombra inseparable" of Carlos Hugo.

== Head of secretaría (1961-1965) ==
Carlist standard

Massó became head of Carlos Hugo's secretaría política, a team composed mostly of people in their 20s. The group, dubbed "camarilla", focused primarily on promotion of the prince as the would-be king of Spain; the campaign was clearly calibrated against prince Juan Carlos, who at the time was gradually emerging as potential Franco's successor and the future monarch. They posed as allies of the regime and seemed aligned with Valiente's collaborative approach; the strategy partially worked and the carlohuguistas were allowed to launch an array of periodicals; Massó published especially in Azada y Asta, though he edited also Información Mensual. and collaborated with Montejurra. The group used these titles as platforms for advocating what they presented as a new, progressist version of Carlism. They were posing as faithful partisans who either merely sought "agiornamento" of the doctrine, or who focused on the genuine, socially-minded basis of the movement.

Already in the early 1960s Massó-led secretaría found themselves suspected of nurturing subversive, progressist, anti-Traditionalist ideas. He claimed to have been a renovator of Carlist orthodoxy and avoided open confrontation with Traditionalist core of the movement; his memoranda which advocated change focused rather on technical, not ideological issues. In 1962-63 Massó skillfully outplayed his chief opponent, José Luis Zamanillo, and got him expelled; he also worked to isolate other groupings, like Siempre. A series of prince-supported reorganizations in the party followed; they diluted power in the top party layer. In 1963 the Massó-led secretaría effectively took control of the main office; though not holding any post in the executive, he became of the key party decision-makers. From this moment on the carlohuguistas spelled out their vision of Carlism more openly; in 1964 they published a progressist ideological lecture, Esquema doctrinal.

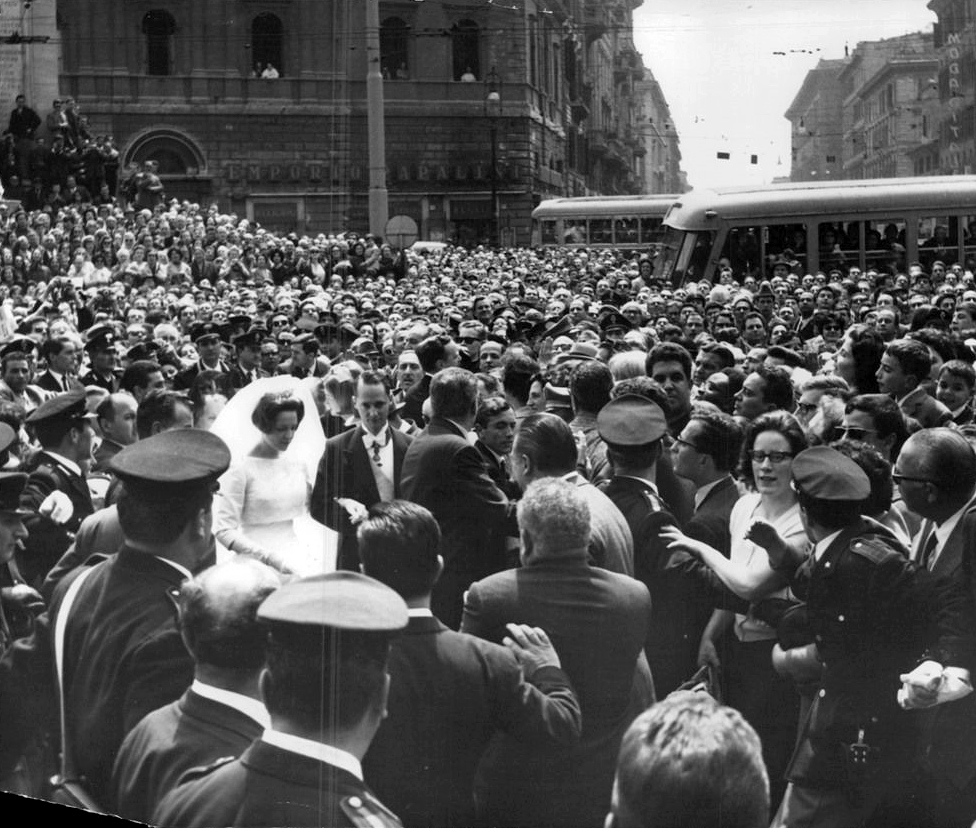
Hugues wedding Irene, Rome 1964

The ideological catch-phrase advanced across Spain was "monarchy of July 18", but Massó formatted the 1961-1964 public campaign in favor of Carlos Hugo rather as a series of "golpes de efecto", a communication strategy engineered to target the emerging consumer society. Apart from touring Spain in various engagements, the prince was portrayed as a miner in Asturias, attendee of a parachuting course, or mozo running with the bulls in Pamplona; his sisters, all in their 20s, were also exploited mediatically. The greatest media scoop, however, was the 1964 wedding of Carlos Hugo with princess Irene of the Netherlands. Massó hoped to win Franco and the Spanish public opinion against prince Juan Carlos; at this point, however, the regime propaganda machine was firmly ordered to backtrack. Franco grew increasingly anxious that the popularity of Carlos Hugo might get him cornered when it comes to an inescapable dynastical decision. National media played down the event. Apparently unabated, Massó kept working to obtain Spanish citizenship for the prince.

== Disengagement (1965-1967) ==
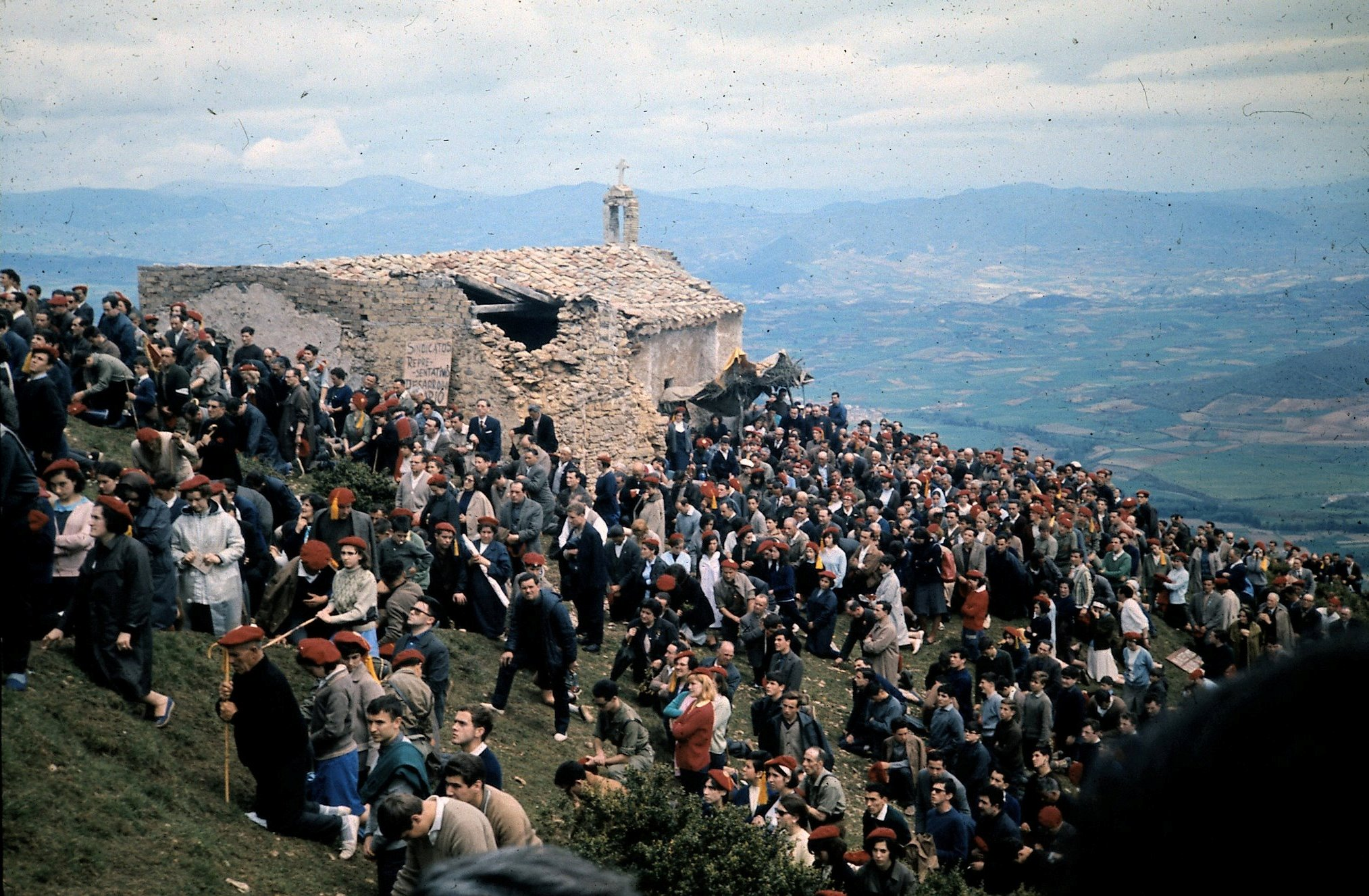
Montejurra ascent, 1960s

In the mid-1960s the Massó-led camarilla appeared largely in control of the Comunión, dubbed its "parallel executive". The isolated traditionalist leader, Valiente, approached Solis for the Cortes mandate for Massó and considered him his potential successor. When speaking at the 1964 Montejurra gathering Massó delivered "one of the most vehemently critical speeches pronounced up to then in a public event in Spain". Though he did not speak in 1965, this year the carlohuguistas almost abandoned their declared allegiance to tradition and voiced praise of socialism at unprecedented levels; the event is at times dubbed as the "swan song" of the secretaría. According to some historians there might have been some cracks within the group, with José María Zavala reportedly representing "sector popular" against the moderated faction represented by Massó, but others tend to treat carlohuguistas as fairly homogeneous. In 1965 the secretaría was at its peak, and Massó assessed that the balance of power between the progressists and the traditionalists was 90:10.

It came as a shock to most in the Comunión when in 1965 Massó declared that he was about to leave the secretariat and move from Madrid to Pamplona, where in the autumn he was scheduled to take a teaching post in Universidad de Navarra, a newly created Opus Dei institution. There are various motives quoted in historiography; some claim he got disillusioned with the prince and his wife, who demonstrated a bourgeoisie mentality, but most scholars tend to agree he realized the project of launching Carlos Hugo failed, that the regime would never grant him Spanish nationality and mediatic campaign would not overweight Franco's political preferences. In early 1966 he met Don Javier in Hendaye; the claimant accepted his resignation, and secretaría política was dissolved altogether. According to some, 1966 marks a ruptura between Massó and Carlos Hugo, though the two kept corresponding in 1967.

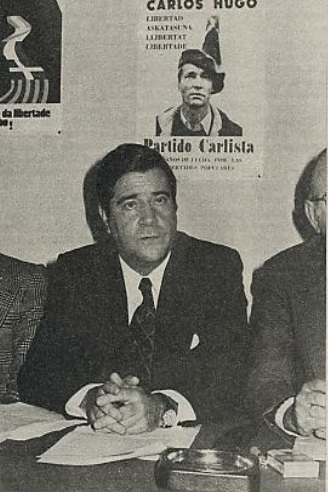
Zavala

Massó considered a new opening. He contemplated provoking an expulsion of Carlos Hugo, which would leave the prince free to embark on anti-regime propaganda, but his suggestions were not acted upon. He limited himself to labors in the local Navarrese milieu, e.g. in 1966 he helped to secure a place of the new El Pensamiento Navarro editor-in-chief for a young progressist, Javier Pascual Ibañez. The claimant explicitly asked him not to engage in open politics. In the spring of 1967 Massó was busy preparing another annual Montejurra ascent in May, but shortly afterwards he and a number of his collaborators from the former secretaría published a widely reproduced open letter. It declared resignations from the party and "the so-called monarchist cause". The reason listed was anti-democratic stand adopted by the claimant dynasty, and especially its opposition to religious liberty. Various authors speculate about other reasons, listing pressure of the Dutch court, failure of the Carlos Hugo project, financial matters, Borbón-Parma support for Franco, mistrust on part of Don Javier and his son, having "burnt themselves out" or even matters of the heart. The role of progressist leader was assumed by Zavala.

== Advertising industry (1967-1983) ==
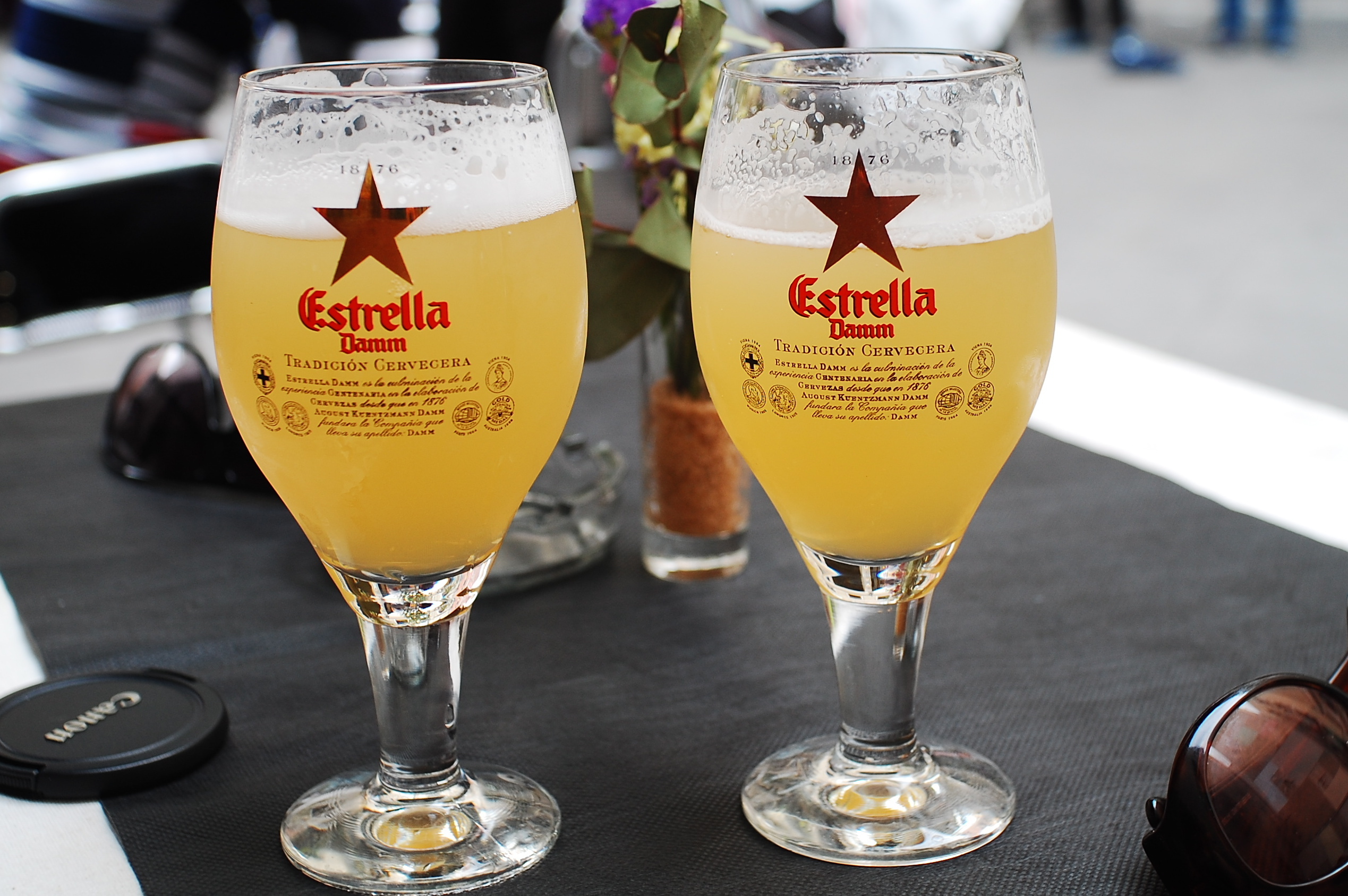
Estrella Damm glasses

Having settled in Pamplona in the mid-1960s Massó commenced as academic in Estudio General de Navarra, founded by Opus Dei and recognized as a private university. Some scholars claim that until the mid-1960s he provided a personal link between Carlism and Opus, the two highly mistrustful about each other. However, reportedly he was getting increasingly disillusioned, not least because of the opusdeista technocrats supporting Juan Carlos. This information does not match data about very strong links of the Massó family with the organisation. In the late 1960s IESE started to offer its courses within the Estudio General de Navarra framework, and Massó was engaged in its works. He also completed the Alta Dirección curriculum himself, a holistic leadership program offered to top corporate managers.

In 1967 Massó broke with Opus Dei and left Gaztelueta. He was about to enter the family enterprise, and spent 1967-1968 learning English in London and the business in family-related companies in Switzerland and Mexico. However, in 1969, when already employed in family-related Comertal, he decided to opt for the nascent advertising industry; he became head of the Barcelona branch of the media agency Clarín. He was co-responsible for launch of some Nestlé products and for the Codorniu brand. In the early 1970s he completed classes organized by Instituto Nacional de Publicidad and in 1972 he officially became "Técnico en Publicidad". About the same time, disappointed with recognition received, he left Clarín and co-founded ALAS, another media agency, and became head of its Barcelona branch. Its greatest success - and also Massó's personal greatest marketing achievement - was re-branding a local financial institution, Caja de Pensiones para la Vejez y Ahorro de Cataluña y Baleares, into La Caixa; another one was the Estrella Damm brand. ALAS was promoting not only commercial products, but also politicians; one of its customers was Eduardo Tarragona. Some time in 1977 or 1978 Massó left ALAS to join the Spanish branch of FCB; his key customer was S.A. Damm and its Estrella Damm brand, a carryover from ALAS. Massó left FCB and, as it turned out, the advertising industry, in 1983.

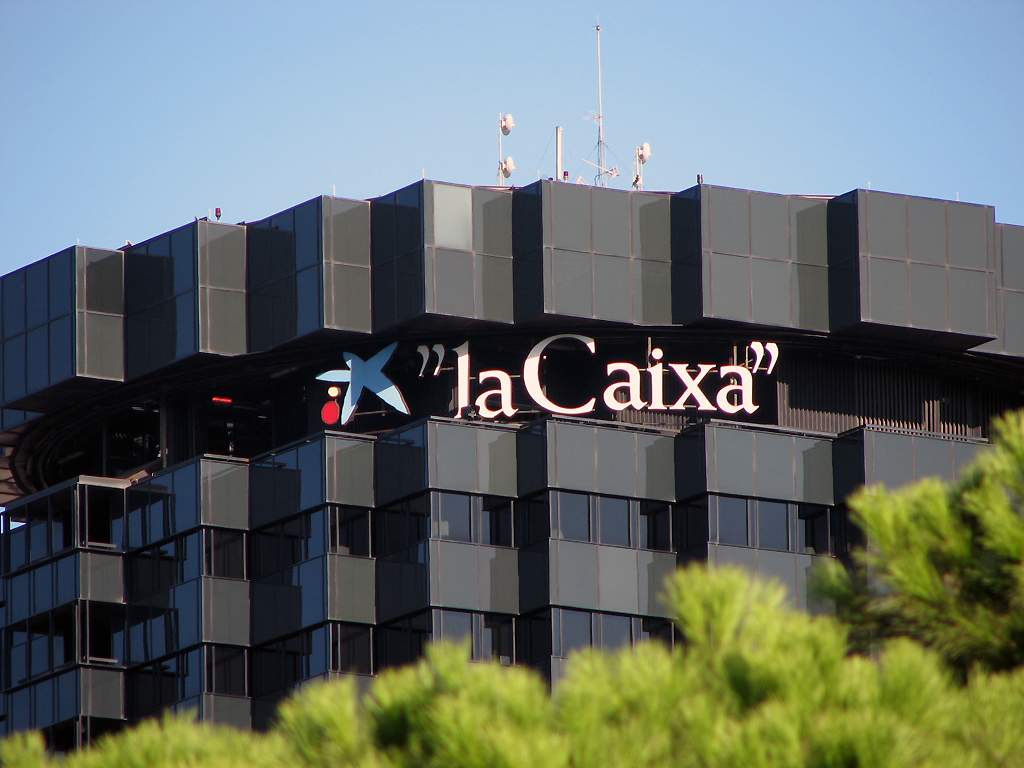
la Caixa brand

In 1977 and jointly with J. E. Nebot Massó published Introducción to ‘politing’. Lanzamiento de un aspirante. The book was formatted as theoretical lecture on basics of political marketing, though it contained many references to the 1957–1967 political experiences of the author, and relative success of launching Carlos Hugo became one of Masso's key credentials as a scholar in public relations. The work gained numerous prizes (Premio Markedit, Premio Instituto Nacional de Publicidad) and generated interest among academics, politicians and commentators. Its catchword was "politing", Massó's invention intended to denote a merger of politics and marketing. He followed up with other works on public relations, Estrategia para unas extrañas elecciones (1977) and De la magia a la artesanía: el politing del cambio español (1980). As expert he was contracted by La Vanguardia and until the mid-1980s he remained its key politics and public affairs commentator.

== Scholar and expert (last years) ==
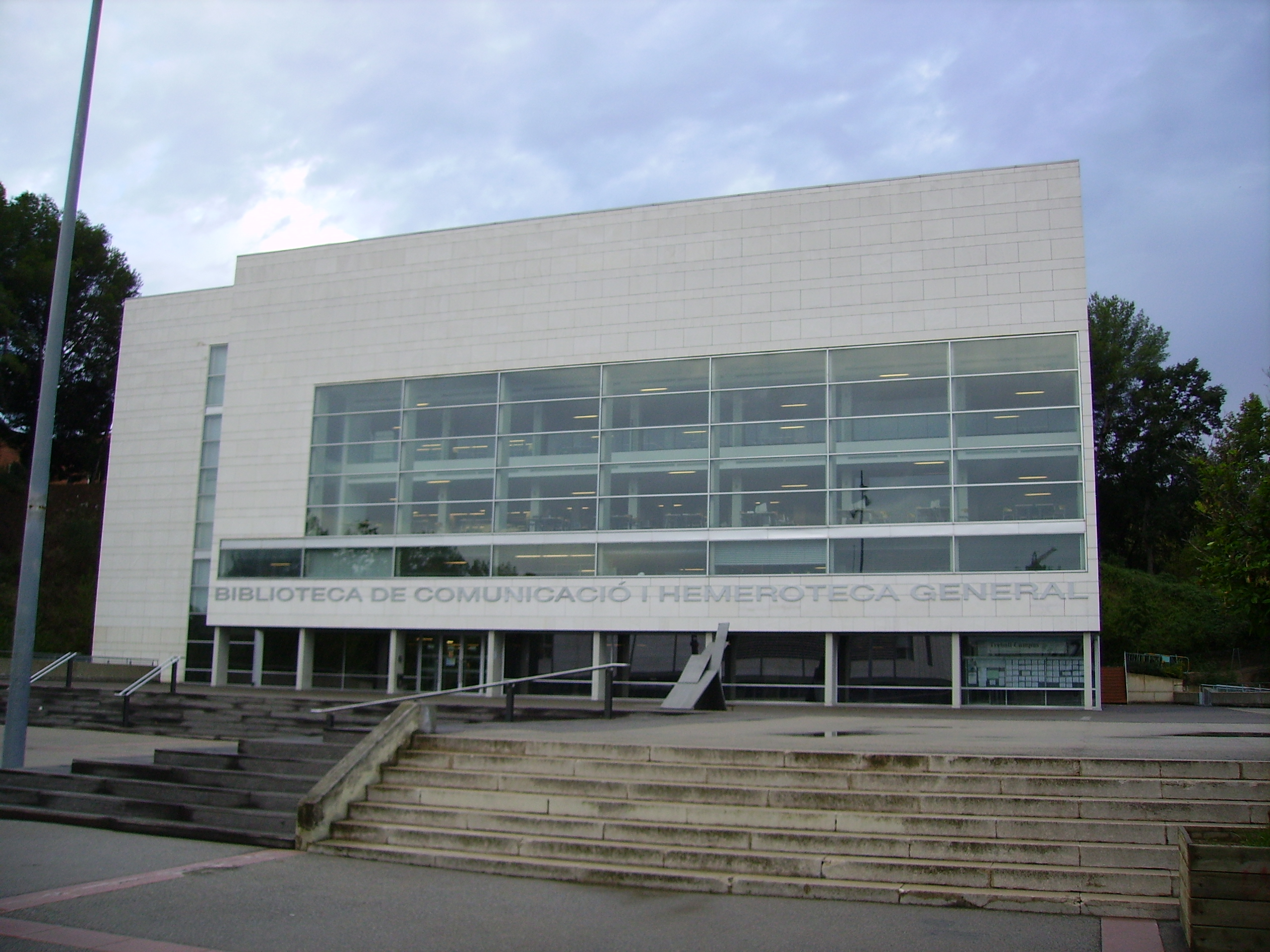
UAB (contemporary view)

Already in the early 1970s Massó joined Universidad Autónoma de Barcelona (UAB), where during a few semesters he was giving classes of publicidad in Departamento de Publicidad at the Facultad de Ciencias de la Información. In 1973 he was already recognized as an expert in the field of advertising, marketing, communications and media, and featured in the press when presiding over international conferences related, two years later speaking along world-recognized gurus like Marshall McLuhan. He started to feature in jury of various media-related prizes, e.g. in 1974 as representative of the Barcelona mediatic milieu in presidency of Premio Gardoqui, a prize awarded by the opusdeista publishing house SARPE, or in 1975 as representative of UAB in presidency of Gran Premio Laureo, awarded by the Barcelona Hoja de Lúnes. His area of expertise was far beyond advertising in the printed media; he also voiced on marketing in cinematography, e.g. in 1975 debating at Festival de Cine Publicitario Iberfilm.

The late 1970s and the 1980s was the period of Massó's top popularity as expert in media, marketing, advertising, brand communications and public relations. He engaged in numerous publishing initiatives, either these related to ALAS or to other institutions; e.g. together with his old collaborator from secretaría, José Antonio Parilla, Massó set up a publishing house Nono Art, and co-ordinated work on a popular series Breu História de Catalunya (1979–81). As a nationwide recognized scholar and apart from his academic role in UAB, he was giving courses organized by Sociedad Española de Anunciantes, Instituto Nacional de Publicidad or Escuela Oficial de Radio y Television. He was on friendly terms with Adolfo Suarez, whom Massó knew since the mid-1960 and interfaced with during late Francoism, when the latter was managing the state TV.

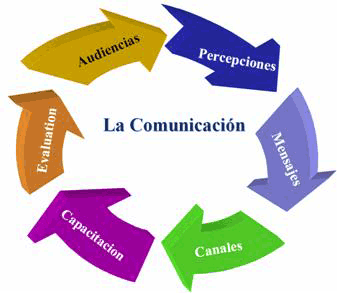
communication model (sample)

In 1989 Massó co-founded the Barcelona-based Institut de Comunicació Integral, an independent college specializing in marketing, brand communications and public relations, and became its president. It was supposed to focus on combined multidimensional holistic channels of information exchange, which he named "integral communication". ICOMI turned out to be a commercial (though not necessarily scientific) success and became a fashionable educational institute; it was sold to and later integrated within Universidad CEU in 2003. He published further works on communications: El exito de la cultura light (1993), Noticias frente a hechos (with García-Lavernia, 1997), Los últimos días de la Telecracia (with Nebot, 2009), and Nacimiento y muerte de las marcas (with García-Lavernia, 2010). Otro rey para España (2004) was more of an account from his Carlist episode, while Navegando por el cachondeo de la historia (2012) approached an autobiographic format. He maintained scarcely active Twitter and Facebook accounts. Since the 1990s Massó renewed his links with carloshuguista groups, e.g. during prince Carlos Javier visits to Spain, during conferences, or extensively briefing PhDs hopefuls, who were writing their dissertations on Carlism of the 1960s.

== In historiography ==
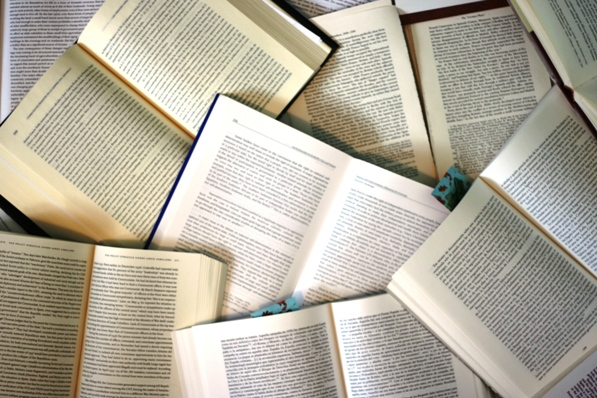

In mainstream historiography dealing with the Francoist era Massó is barely noticed. However, in works dedicated to history of Carlism of the time he appears as one of key figures, mentioned either as a protagonist or a source 21 times (García Ríol), 22 (Caspistegui), 44 (Miralles Climent), 46 (Lavardin), 111 (Vázquez de Prada), 159 (Rodón Guinjoan) and 189 (Martorell Pérez). With few exceptions he is almost unanimously identified as the leader of the progressist group, which challenged the traditionalists and took control over the Comunión, even though later this role has been taken over by José Zavala. Depending upon political preferences of partisan authors, Massó might be presented as an evil spirit who contributed to destruction of the grand movement or as a man who steered Carlism back to its socialist roots.

In both partisan and academic historiography Massó remains a rather ambiguous figure, with little agreement as to his role and intentions. Above all, it is not clear whether Massó intended to instaurate the Carlist dynasty by means of new social mobilization or whether he tried to promote profound ideological transformation using Carlos Hugo as an agent of change; anyway, the two threads became intertwined. According to one group of studies Massó was primarily motivated by dynastical objectives, according to another he was not a monarchist at all. Some claim that he consciously launched the process of redirecting Carlism towards a progressist, socialist formula, while some maintain that initially he did not aim for revolutionary change, and that cumulative radicalization emerged as an unintended collateral phenomenon.

There are numerous other question marks related. There are scholars who consider Massó a radical Leftist approximate to Marxism, while others consider him a "neocapitalist technocrat". To some he was "in fondo colaboracionista", while others present his strategy as opposition to "colaboracionismo puro". Certain works picture Carlos Hugo as a figure invented and created by Massó, while others see Massó as Carlos Hugo's sidekick, useful at one political phase and to be replaced at the following one. Some thought him a pawn of Opus Dei, while others view his position towards Opus and religion as highly ambiguous. A few treat Massó and Zavala as representatives of the same current, while others present them as ideological rivals.

Groups which claim Carlist identity hardly admit deference to Massó. The traditionalists tend to view him as a traitor and turncoat at best, and as a subversive leftist who infiltrated the movement at worst. The progressists might also deny him the name of a Carlist altogether and categorize Massó as a false Carlist and in fact a traditionalist; they might also see him as sort of an opusdeista fellow-traveler. However, some heirs to the carloshuguista current, mostly related to prince Carlos Javier, cherish his memory as the advocate of "a renewing proposal for a progressive Monarchy as a guarantee of a system of concrete freedoms" and an example of loyalty to the dynasty.

== See also ==
- Carlism
- Carlos Hugo, Duke of Parma
- Francoism
