= Nueva Pescanova =

Spanish seafood company

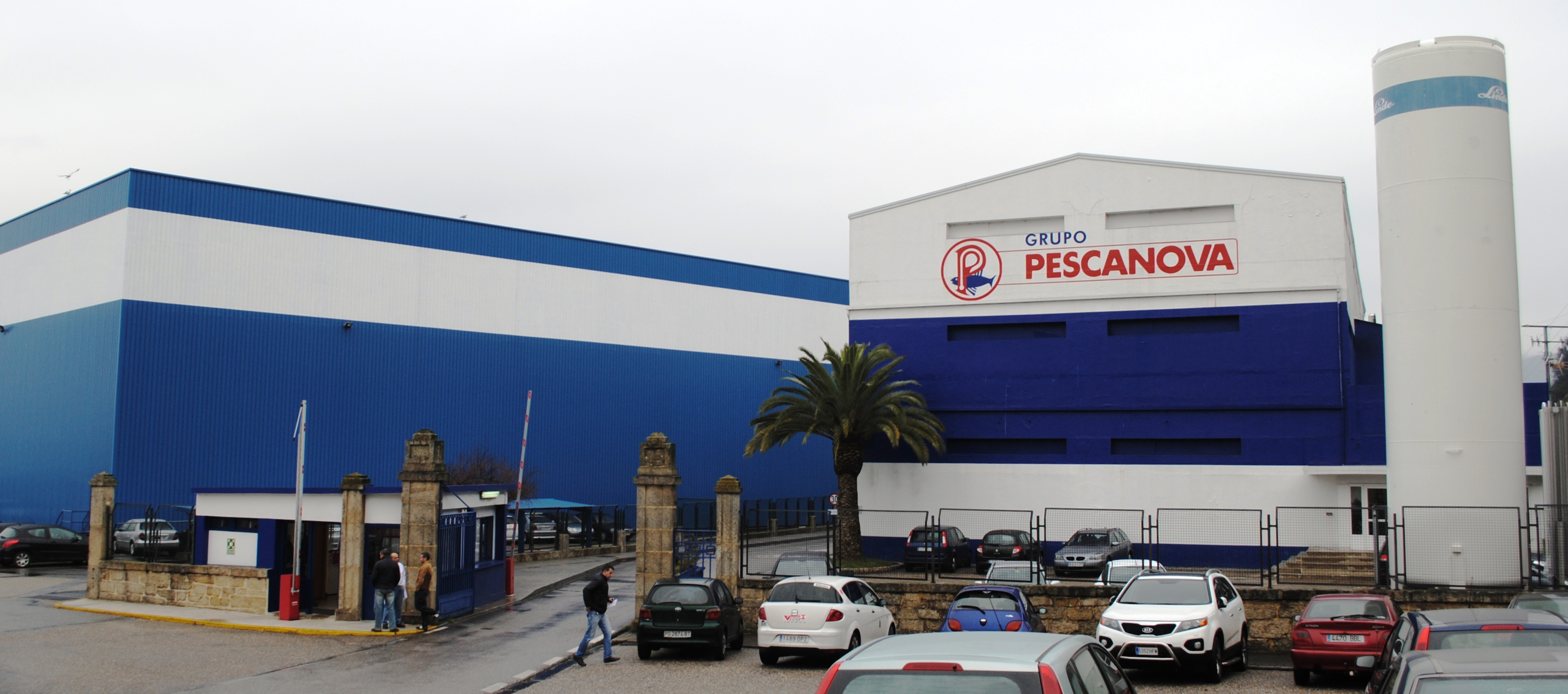
- Formerly: Pescanova, S.A.
- Type: Sociedad Anónima
- Traded as: BMAD: PVA; FWB: PNV
- Industry: Fishing
- Founded: Pontevedra, Spain (June 1, 1960)
- Founder: José Fernández López
- Headquarters: Redondela, Spain
- Products: Fresh Fish, Frozen Fish, Value-added Fish products, Fish meals, Frozen food
- Revenue: ▼€ 1.49 billion (2009)
- Operating income: ▼€ 88 million (2009)
- Total assets: ▼€ 964 million (2009)
- Number of employees: 7,700 (3,399 in Spain)
- Subsidiaries: Fishco, Acuinova, Aliholding
- Website: www.pescanova.com

Nueva Pescanova (previously Pescanova, S.A.) is a Spanish seafood company based in Redondela, Galicia. The group operates in 17 countries with approximately 12,400 employees.

== Company ==
Nueva Pescanova in headquartered in Pontevedra, Redondela, Spain. It operates in 17 countries, has more than 60 fishing vessels, and runs fish farming in Spain, Nicaragua, Guatemala, and Ecuador.

The company's chief executive officer is José María Benavent Valero.

== Early history ==
Pescanova was founded in 1960 by José Fernández López, who established the company in Vigo. From its beginnings Pescanova introduced new technology for the complete activity of fish processing, best defined by the factory ship which was not common in Spain at the time. The business model worked and allowed a continued growth making it one of the biggest firms in the fishing industry.

In 1980 Manuel Fernández de Sousa-Faro, the son of the founder, took over the presidency and, after a period of restructuring, Pescanova became a multinational empire. In 1985 it joined Madrid Stock Exchange.

== Bankruptcy ==
On 15 April 2013, Pescanova filed in Spanish court for bankruptcy protection. The insolvency filing mentions debts of €1.5bn, but financial sources who have had dealings with the company say total debt is probably more than double that amount, potentially making it the country's third-largest bankruptcy. The court accepted the filing and said it would name independent administrators to replace the board. Pescanova revealed only on the day of the insolvency filing that Fernandez Sousa had sold half his 14.4 percent stake in the company in the months leading up to the filing without telling regulators, as required by law.

The multinational empire had by January 2014 an accumulated debt of €5.8bn, according to Spain's National Securities Market Commission (CNMV). In January 2014, three multinational investment funds were interested to refloat the bankrupt company with approximately €300m. The company operated under court protection while arrangements were made. The interested investors are consortia of:

1. Damm, Luxempart, KKR and Ergon Capital Partners;
2. Centerbridge and Bluecrest vulture funds,
3. the major domestic creditor banks - Banco Sabadell, Banco Popular, NCG Banco, Bankia, CaixaBank, Santander and BBVA

The current board and management were opposed by minority shareholders. A director of Pescanova, Luis Angel Sanchez Merlo, resigned on 14 January 2014.

Simultaneously, negotiations were under way to separate Pesca Chile from the others through an offer by Cooke Aquaculture of Canada and Econsult of Philadelphia.

On 17 February 2014, Pescanova disclosed a new set of over €2bn outstanding loans to its restructuring committee. The loans are trading at about 12 cents on the euro while €160mn of its convertible bonds are quoted at about 14 cents. Lenders were willing to accept losses of 60 percent on the debt in exchange for a 90 percent stake in the Pontevedra, Spain-based business.

On 2 May 2014, the major domestic creditor banks agreed to lift the bankruptcy, and the company remained as one of the Galician multinationals. Damm and Luxempart were sidelined, and as a result, Jose Carceller of Damm and Francois Tesch of Luxempart resigned from the board of directors.

On 23 May 2014, Pescanova exited bankruptcy proceedings after 403 days. The restructuring plan had received support from 65% of its major domestic creditor banks. The company was to continue under administration by Deloitte, until the subsequent shareholders’ meeting. On 22 May 22, Deloitte reported to the Spanish financial regulator CNMV the resignation of Juan Manuel Urgoiti, who had been chairman of the Spanish multinational since September 2013.

On 8 January 2015, Manuel Fernandez Sousa-Faro was chastised because of his failure to report a number of properties to the Court, which had fined him for his role in the collapse of Pescanova. In January 2014, Fernandez had been condemned, along with colleagues Carlos Turci, Alfonso Garcia and Angel Gonzales, Alfonso Paz-Andrade, Fernando Fernandez, Robert Albert Williams, Antonio Taboas, Joaquin Vina, Alfredo Lopez and ICS Holding Limited, for their contributions to the collapse of the firm.

On 2 February 2015, the company reported profits of €1.6bn, which contrasted with losses one year earlier that totalled €718mn. By 6 February 2015, New York-based hedge fund Broadbill Investment Partners had acquired 3.69% of Pescanova, according to records of the Spanish financial regulator CNMV. The financial regulator showed Pescanova's former chairman Manuel Fernandez de Sousa as the company's largest shareholder with 7.5% of shares, followed by the Spanish heiress Carolina Herrero Masaveu, with 7.1% and Spanish brewery Damm, which lost its bid to control the fishing giant the previous year, with 6.2%.

After the bankruptcy proceedings, the creditors took the control of all the assets of the Group through the new parent company Nueva Pescanova, S.L. Pescanova S.A. is the only asset as 2021 is a minimum share in the equity of Nueva Pescanova (0.34%).

== Post-bankruptcy history ==
After poor financial performance caused by global inflation, Canadian company Cooke and American company Red Chamber was two of three companies negotiating to buy the company in February 2023.

=== Octopus farming ===
Nueva Pescanova was the first company in the world to successfully breed octopuses in captivity.

In 2023, the company's plans to build an octopus farm in Las Palmas in Gran Canaria were met with objections from scientists and animal welfare activists. Groups objecting to the plans include Compassion in World Farming and Eurogroup for Animals. In 2026, plans for the farm were dropped.

== See also ==
- Port of Vigo
