= Javier María Pascual Ibañez =

Spanish publisher and activist

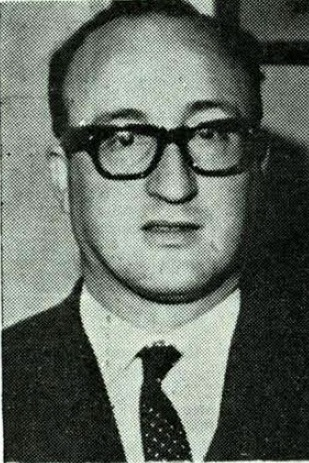
- Born: Javier María Pascual Ibañez; 1933; Sangüesa, Spain
- Died: 1998 (aged 64–65); Madrid, Spain
- Occupation: editor
- Known for: publisher
- Political party: Carlism

Javier María Santiago Pascual Ibañez (1933–1998) was a Spanish publisher and a Carlist activist. His professional career climaxed in the 1980s, upon assuming management of Departamento del Español Urgente in Agencia EFE, a unit with linguistic normative designs upon the entire Hispanic world. He is best known, however, for his role in El Pensamiento Navarro; under his guidance in the late 1960s the daily was instrumental in Socialist takeover of Carlist structures.

== Family and youth ==
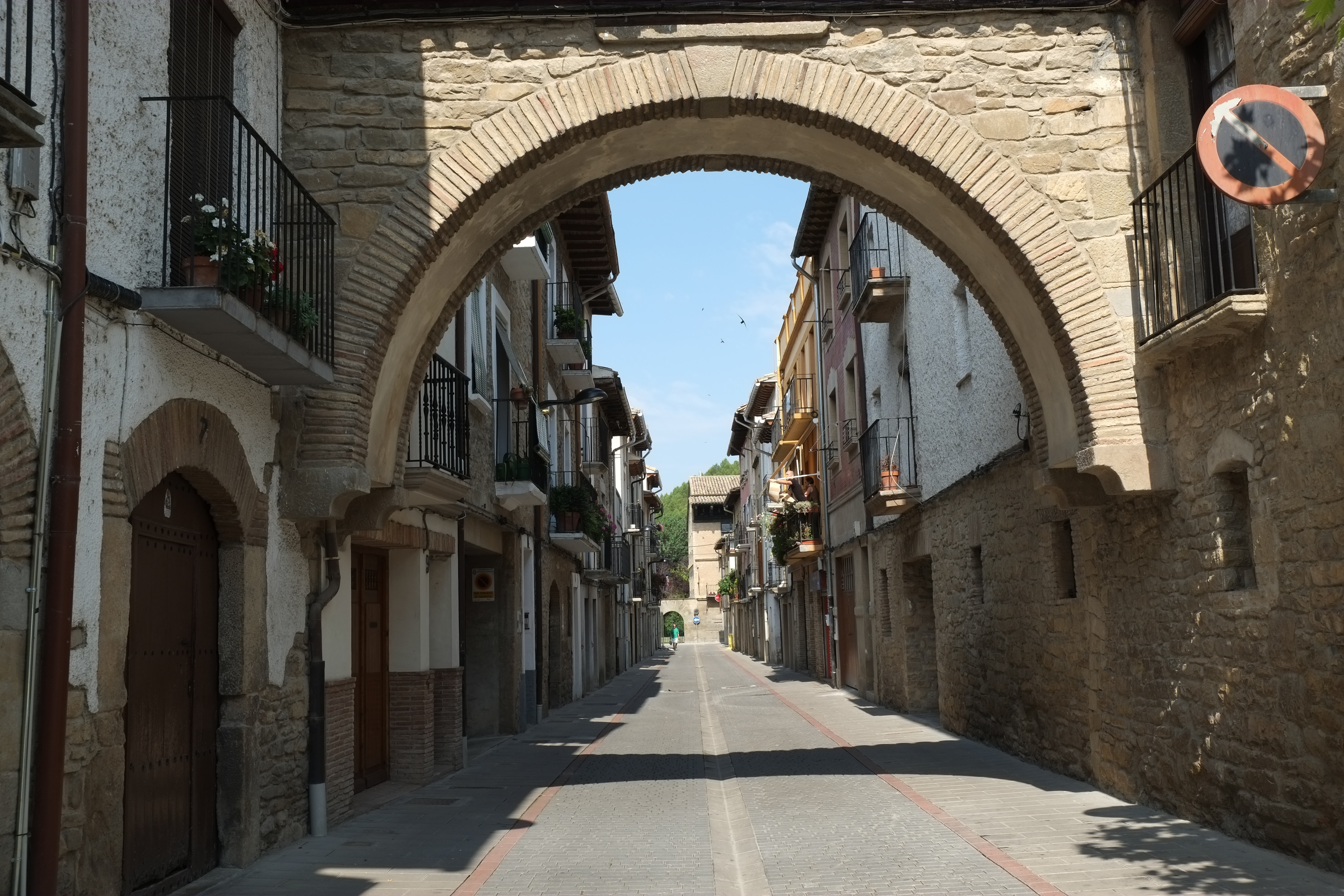
Sangüesa

The Pascual family have been related to the Navarrese village of Etayo, a few kilometers from the iconic mountain of Montejurra. Though its first progenitor can be traced back to the 16th century, none of his descendants made their name in the history of the region. Javier María's paternal grandfather, Genaro Pascual Subirán, was a local farmer; he married a girl from nearby Lorca, Severina Hermoso de Mendoza. Their son and the father of Javier María, Hernán Pascual Hermoso de Mendoza, was the first one to leave Etayo; having studied medicine and recording what was described by his son as a triumphal achievement, he became a doctor. In the 1920s Hernán Pascual settled in Sangüesa, in the Navarrese Prepirineos. He was a member of Cuerpo de Inspectores Municipales de Sanidad and practiced as a physician in the area; he is recorded in the living memory as "muy bueno". None of the sources consulted provides any information on his wife and Javier María's mother, María Ibañez; her son remembers her as extremely hard-working and devout.

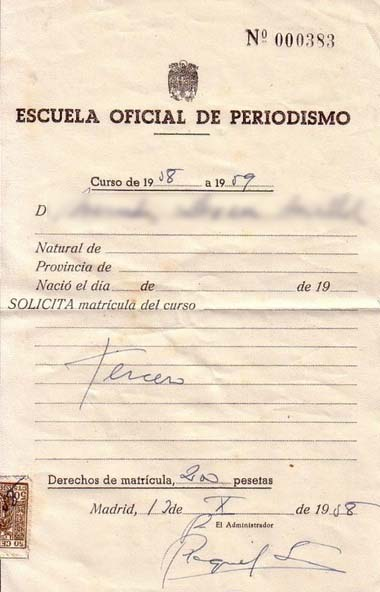
Escuela Oficial de Periodismo matriculation certificate, 1958

Javier María and his 3 sisters were brought up in a fervently Catholic ambience; one of them became a nun. He was first educated in the Jesuit colleges in Durango, Javier, and Tudela, narrowly evading expulsion as his independent character caused conflict and controversy. Upon bachillerato, obtained in 1951, the Jesuits suggested that he enters a novitiate; himself feeling he was rather tempted to pursue his knack for letters. However, Javier María's parents were skeptical and persuaded him to study law. Pascual was not at all enthusiastic, but he appreciated the advantages offered by the juridical culture; he moved to the capital and enrolled at Facultad de Derecho of the Madrid University. He completed the curriculum and graduated at an unspecified time, most likely in the mid-1950s. He did not give up his juvenile penchant; and in 1954 he joined the Madrid-based Escuela Oficial de Periodismo, becoming an officially licensed press journalist later on.

It is not clear whether before moving to Madrid Pascual started contributing to the Navarrese press, especially that two of his relatives wrote to Pamplona periodicals and held admin positions in the local newspaper realm. During the academic period he was already noted as a Madrid envoy of two key Pamplona dailies, Diario de Navarra and El Pensamiento Navarro; some time afterwards he commenced contributing also to journals elsewhere, sending correspondence from the capital to La Gaceta del Norte (Bilbao) and El Correo Catalán (Barcelona). In an unclear position he was also involved in a technical corporate periodical Información de la Publicidad. Some time, prior to the mid-1960s, Javier María Pascual married María Rosa Figueroa Otermín. The couple lived mostly in Madrid, though in the second half of the 1960s they resided in Pamplona. They had 8 children, 4 sons and 4 daughters; none of them became a public figure recognized nationwide.

== Early public career ==
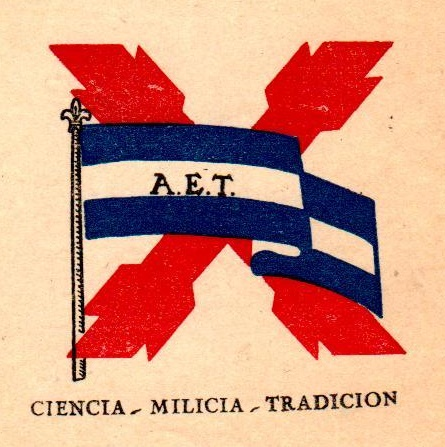
AET logotype

There were both Falangist and Carlist antecedents among Pascual's close family. He admitted great influence of a maternal relative, Joaquín Arbeloa, during early Francoism an emerging star in Navarrese historiography and journalism, co-founder of combative Falangist review Jerarquía and in the 1940s contributor to Diario de Navarra. Javier María remained indebted also to a paternal relative Angel María Pascual, a Falangist old-shirt, president of Asociación de la Prensa de Pamplona, a poet and a correspondent of Navarrese and national newspapers. On the other hand, Javier María's father was a vehement Carlist and his paternal uncle, José Manuel Pascual Hermoso de Mendoza, was an iconic movements figure; as a former Requeté chaplain, he served as a parish priest first in Etayo and then in Pamplona, active also as leader of a Traditionalist ex-combatant religious organization.

Having arrived in Madrid in the mid-1950s Pascual approached students of Traditionalist heritage, grouped in semi-legal AET. He perfectly fit their typical profile, "de procedencia rural o de pequeñas ciudades no demasiado urbanizadas, católicos, monárquicos y legitimistas". Brought up in Traditionalist ambience in their provincial towns but enjoying autonomy of students living in a huge city, they were not particularly concerned with the doctrine and looked for a new format of Carlism. With a new mid-1950s pro-collaborationist turn of the party the youth benefitted the most: the regime permitted a launch of AET-controlled periodicals La Encina and Azada y asta. Pascual was involved in both, in 1957–58 as editor-in-chief of the former and since 1959 of the latter. Under his guidance it grew into a platform where Traditionalism mixed with a search for a new intellectual formula, increasingly endorsing heterodoxy. Pascual contributed himself, focusing on social and religious topics; in line with ongoing Vaticanum II preparations, he called for a new Church. Falling short of openly embracing liberal trends, he endorsed "catolicismo liberal" in "su sentido etimológico y no político". Some of his combative pro-Carlist pieces have been noted even by the exile Republican press in France.

Carlist standard

In the late 1950s and early 1960s Pascual kept contributing to a number of regional and national titles, including 24, a periodical issued by the Francoist student organization SEU, Imperio, a syndicalist daily, or Punta Europa, an ambitious Traditionalism-flavored Catholic monthly. His first major assignment was the 1961 appointment to the editorial board of El Alcázar, a hard-line Falangist Madrid daily. Pascual remained in the board during the following 5 years and in the early 1960s started to emerge as a young star of the Madrid media. His articles were getting nominated to various awards, be it Catholic or corporative ones; as the representative of "prensa madrileña" he travelled across Spain and abroad; he was honored with Cruz de Orden de Cisneros, awarded by Movimiento Nacional for meritorious civil service. Last but not least, he started to appear on TV as a guest pundit, invited among chief editors of major dailies.

== El Pensamiento Navarro ==
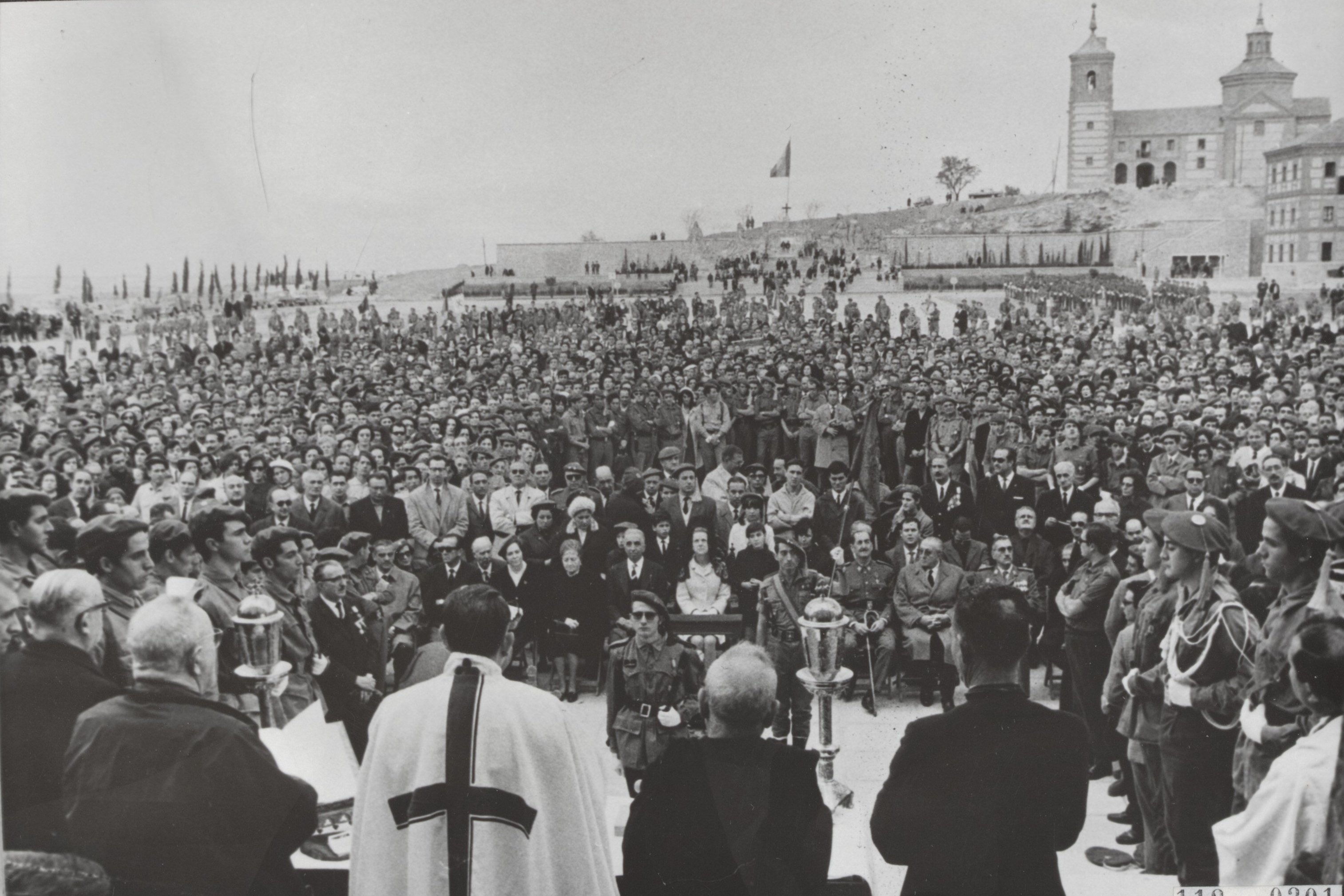
Carlist meeting, 1966

In the mid-1960s Carlism was increasingly but not openly divided between the reactionary Traditionalists, standing by ultra-conservative principles, and those seeking a progressist formula, soon known as Carlohuguistas. Though intellectual leader of the latter and Pascual's mentor Ramón Massó abandoned politics, his AET-entourage continued the campaign to gain control of key positions in the party. Supported by the Carlist heir-to-the-throne Don Carlos Hugo, in 1966 they ensured Pascual's nomination to manager of the semi-official Carlist mouthpiece, El Pensamiento Navarro. It is not clear whether the Traditionalists realized the plot; officially they wholeheartedly endorsed Pascual.

Due to lack of funds Pascual failed to launch a technological overhaul of the antiquated newspaper; he made it look more agile by re-arranging the layout, introducing new columns and bringing in new staff. The key change, however, was de-emphasizing Traditionalism and saturating the pages with novel democratic ideas of the Carlohuguistas. The editorial line championed by Pascual avoided open confrontation. To the contrary, the change was styled as renovating Carlists thought; he presented Carlism not as a fixed doctrine but rather as a dynamic approach. Key elements of this strategy were highlighting two pillars of the movement's ideological toolset: unswerving loyalty to the Carlist dynasty and to the Church. As the former was getting dominated by Don Carlos Hugo and the latter were undergoing transformation adopted at Vaticanum II, the strategy worked as a trap for conservatively-minded readers; it also served as a springboard to advance increasingly Left-wing ideas.

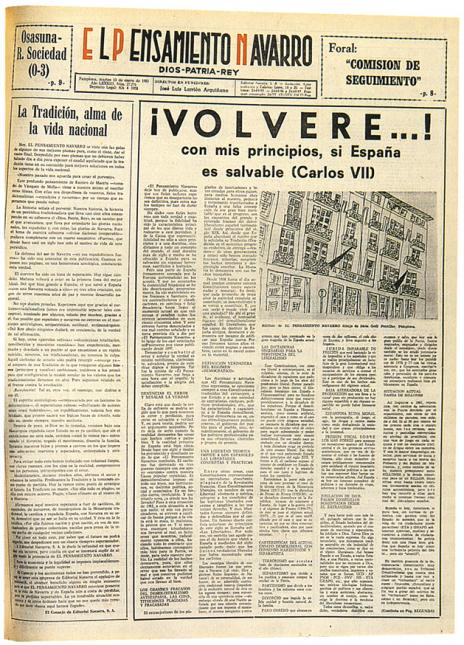
El Pensamiento Navarro (issue from the post-Pascual period)

Apart from mobilizing support for the Borbón-Parmas and for labor-related changes embraced by the Church, another key thread of the newspaper was the support for de-centralised organisation of state. This however, has never amounted to endorsing separatism of peripheral nationalisms, which Pascual vehemently opposed. Though supportive of creeping democratization, Pensamiento avoided an open challenge of either Franco or Francoism and – perhaps to some extent genuinely – boasted fidelity to "the spirit of July 18th". Calls for liberalization were styled as defense of the very regime, official auto-denomination of the state as "Monarquía Tradícional, Católica, Social y Representativa" was repeated ad nauseam, and Franco's own words were often quoted when presenting Carlism as representation of "la España ideal, frente a la bastarda y afrancesada de los liberales".

The regime identified Pensamiento as subversive, though it applied few inconclusive measures. The boldest one was a 46-day exile in Riaza, administered versus Pascual in early 1969. More fateful were differences with the Traditionalists controlling Editorial Navarra, a front company which owned the newspaper. Though there were no public clashes between Pascual and the board in 1966–1968, key Traditionalist pundits used to challenge Pascual's line from the very onset. In the late 1960s he was already considered one of three "prohombres del neocarlismo socialista", who presided over transformation towards Marxism. Following the printing of the declaration issued by Catholic syndicates, which in the name of "the working class" lambasted "unjust and inhuman capitalist system", in the spring of 1970 Pascual was officially admonished by the managing board; in July that year Editorial Navarra terminated Pascual's employment contract.

== Back in Madrid: politics and around ==
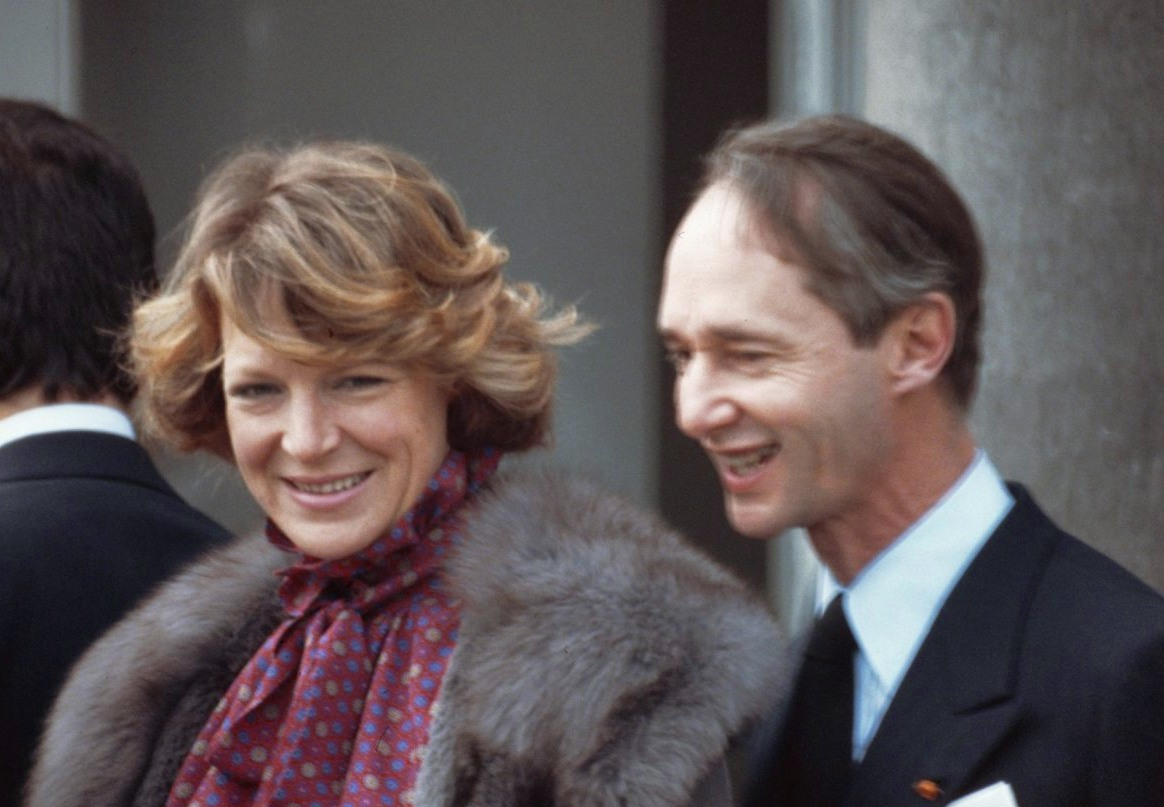
Carlos Hugo and his wife, 1978

Pascual's dismissal came as a heavy blow for the Carlohuguistas; under his guidance El Pensamiento Navarro was "instrumental for a new Carlist evolution" and together with a few minor periodicals constituted a propaganda branch of the Progressists. The faction immediately launched a counter-strike; they attempted to remove the Traditionalists from the Editorial Navarra board, orchestrated a wave of protest letters and engineered a boycott of the newspaper; the campaign climaxed in a bombing attempt. All that proved fruitless and El Pensamiento Navarro was re-claimed by the Traditionalists, their last and ephemeral victory in the struggle to control the party. At that time the Carlist structures were already firmly dominated by the Carlohuguistas.

Apart from a minor role in an advisory Carlist propaganda body, Pascual held no political positions either in Comunión Tradicionalista or in a 1970-created Carlohuguista organisation, Partido Carlista. He was also not an ideologue and no rally-type speaker; his role was chiefly about managing the faction's propaganda campaign and as such is classified as representative of "sector más abierto del Carlismo". Having left Pamplona and taken up employment in a state-ran media company, Pascual no longer was an asset for the party. Moreover, he developed doubts about a militantly left-bound and decreasingly religious course adopted by Partido Carlista. Though earlier he praised the party ideologue, Pedro José Zabala, as "carlista sin lastres inncecesarios", he later nurtured some second thoughts and corresponding with the old-time party leader Manuel Fal tended to accept at least some criticism. As a result, Pascual's relationship with Partido Carlista deteriorated, especially as co-managing a state-ran news agency in the early 1970s, he could have not afforded demonstrating radical political sympathies. None of the sources consulted provides any information on Pascual's involvement in Partido Carlista electoral efforts of the transición. In 1976 he might have been involved in Progressist seizure of Carlist historical memorabilia. The last time he was identified as supporting Don Carlos Hugo was in 1978, when Pascual took part in Jornadas Carlistas de la Prensa in Madrid.

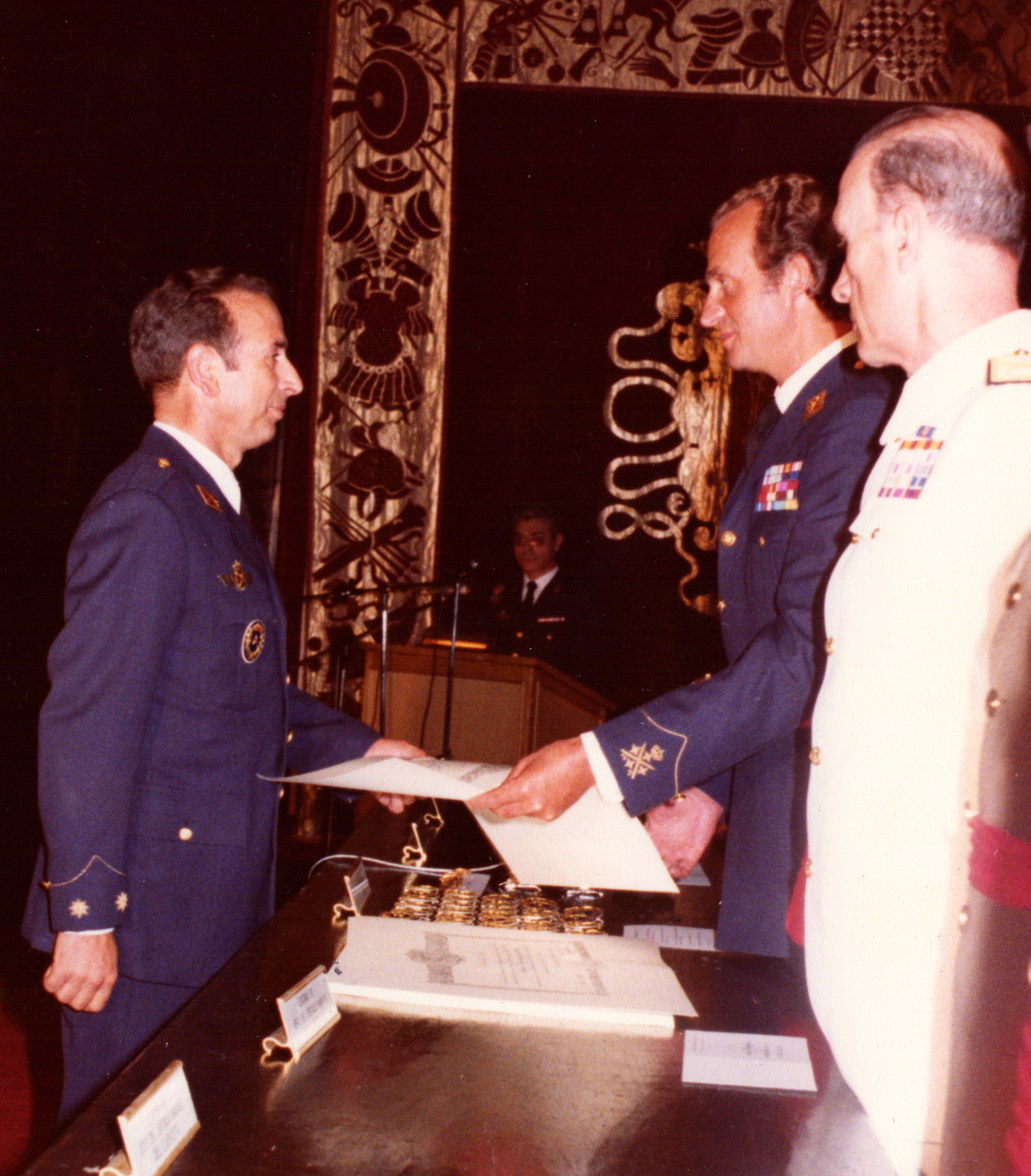
Juan Carlos, 1984

The late 1970s and the early 1980s marked Pascual's full integration within the public realm of post-Francoist Spain. In 1979 he entered the executive of Asociación de la Prensa de Madrid and – perhaps as a great fan of bullfighting – was appointed head of its Comisión de Festejos. Taking part in a number of corporate debates in 1983 he grew to vice-secretary of AdP. His career in the Asociación came to an abrupt end in 1984, marking also completion of his dynastical u-turn. Protesting against what he perceived as a TVE insult to king Juan Carlos, he resigned from all functions in the corporate association - which did not prevent him from nurturing "gran sentimiento" towards the memory of his former Carlist monarch, Don Javier. What did not change was Pascual's opposition to Basque separatism. Though he fully supported new democratic media legislation, in the late 1980s Pascual publicly demonstrated some unease about what he considered blasphemous threads in the free Spanish media.

== Agencia EFE ==
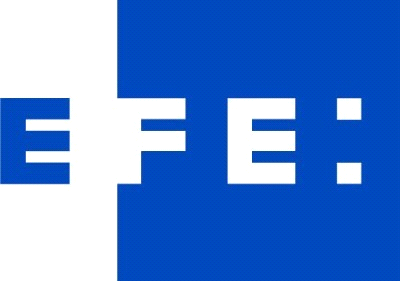
EFE logotype

Upon returning to Madrid, Pascual was employed in the central office of Agencia EFE, the official Spanish news agency. It is not clear what his role in the company structure was in the early 1970s; according to one source he worked as redactor-jefe, a senior editor responsible for news released during his shift. Already at that time he was a respected figure in the world of Madrid media; in 1973 he was among the first ones to move into the so-called Ciudad de los Periodistas, a complex of five high-rise residential buildings commissioned by Asociación de la Prensa, in the 21st century still dubbed "the best place to live in Madrid". As Pascual was redactor-jefe during the night Franco died, it was he who determined how the news was distributed. Some time prior to mid-1979 he rose to executive of Sección de Información Nacional and subdirector of the entire agency; in 1981 he was nominated manager of the national section of EFE.

In the early 1980s EFE created Departamento del Español Urgente (DEU), a sub-unit dedicated mostly to quality assurance; its focus was on language and style used by the agency, with three key tasks specified. Pascual was nominated head of DEU; at this job he shaped his modus operandi and prioritized work, presiding over Comisión Permanente and co-operating with Comisión Asesora. It is not clear whether, apart from typical managerial tasks, his role was also providing actual linguistic and editorial expertise; however, he clearly emerged as leader of a unit set up as high authority on Spanish language, with a normative role across EFE branches worldwide and exercising influence on the entire Hispanic realm. At this position Pascual tackled heterogeneity of Spanish as used worldwide and led the drive to introduce a global standard, to be shaped mostly by Madrid and adopted across all Hispanic communities.

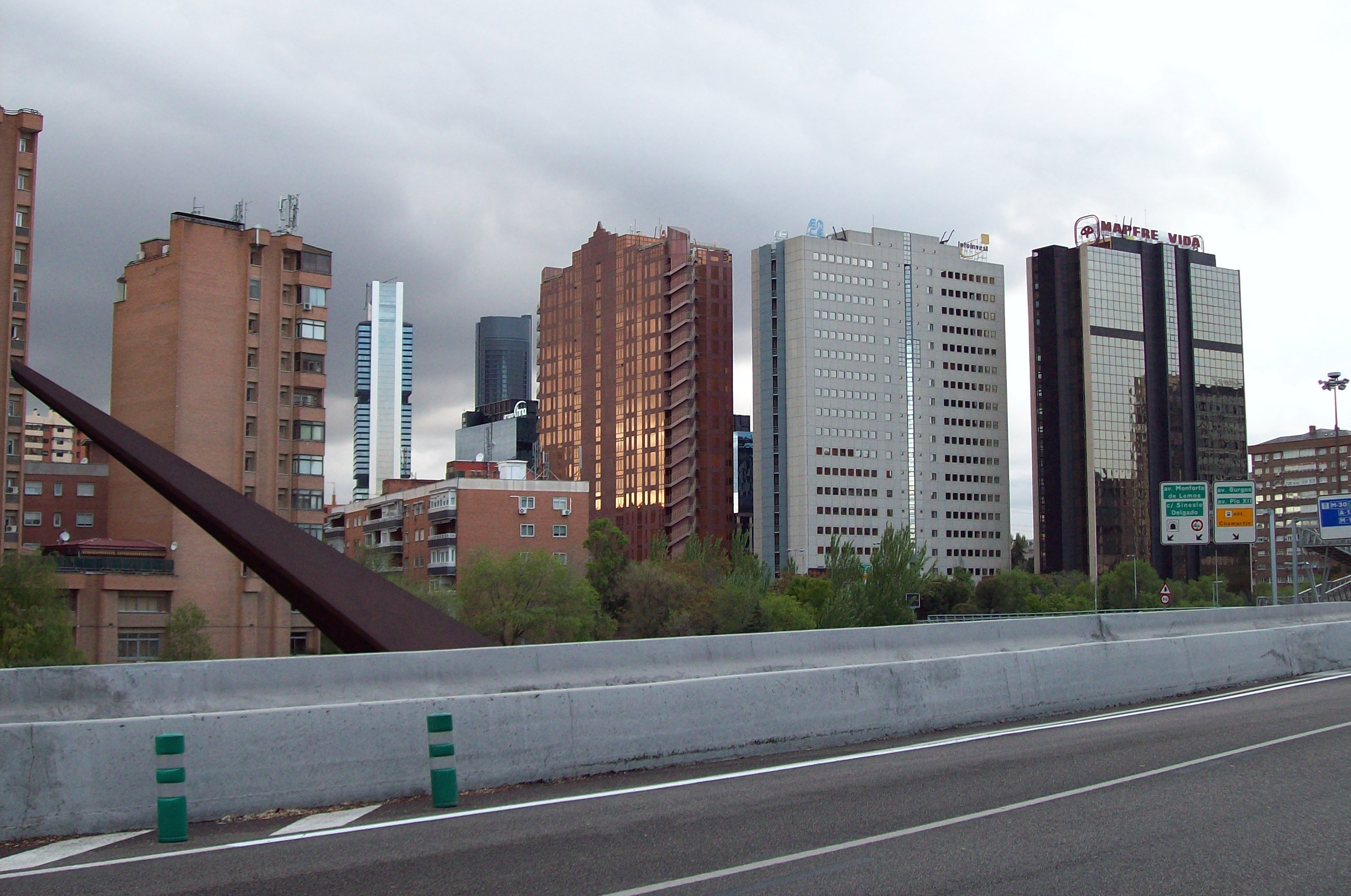
EFE hq (2nd from right), Madrid

Pascual continued as one of the EFE subdirectors and head of DEU across the 1980s. Due to his role he interfaced with a number of institutions, including Real Academia Española, e.g. when championing his homogeneity drive and attempting to set up Fundación para la Defensa de la Lengua Española; he also took part in a number of linguistic and educational initiatives. Apart from having been responsible for periodical updates of EFE's Manual of Style, he edited and co-edited a number of EFE publications. The best-known of them El neologismo necesario (1992). For reasons which are not clear in 1992 he ceased as head of the unit, at that time renamed Departamento de Control de Publicación y Análisis de Estilo of EFE. The motive might have been his poor health; in 1994 he was already noted for frequent absence on sittings of the EFE boards. It is not clear whether Pascual's ailing health was anyhow related to a serious car accident he suffered in Pamplona in 1967. A car he drove collided with a truck and Pascual sustained very heavy injuries.

== Academic ==
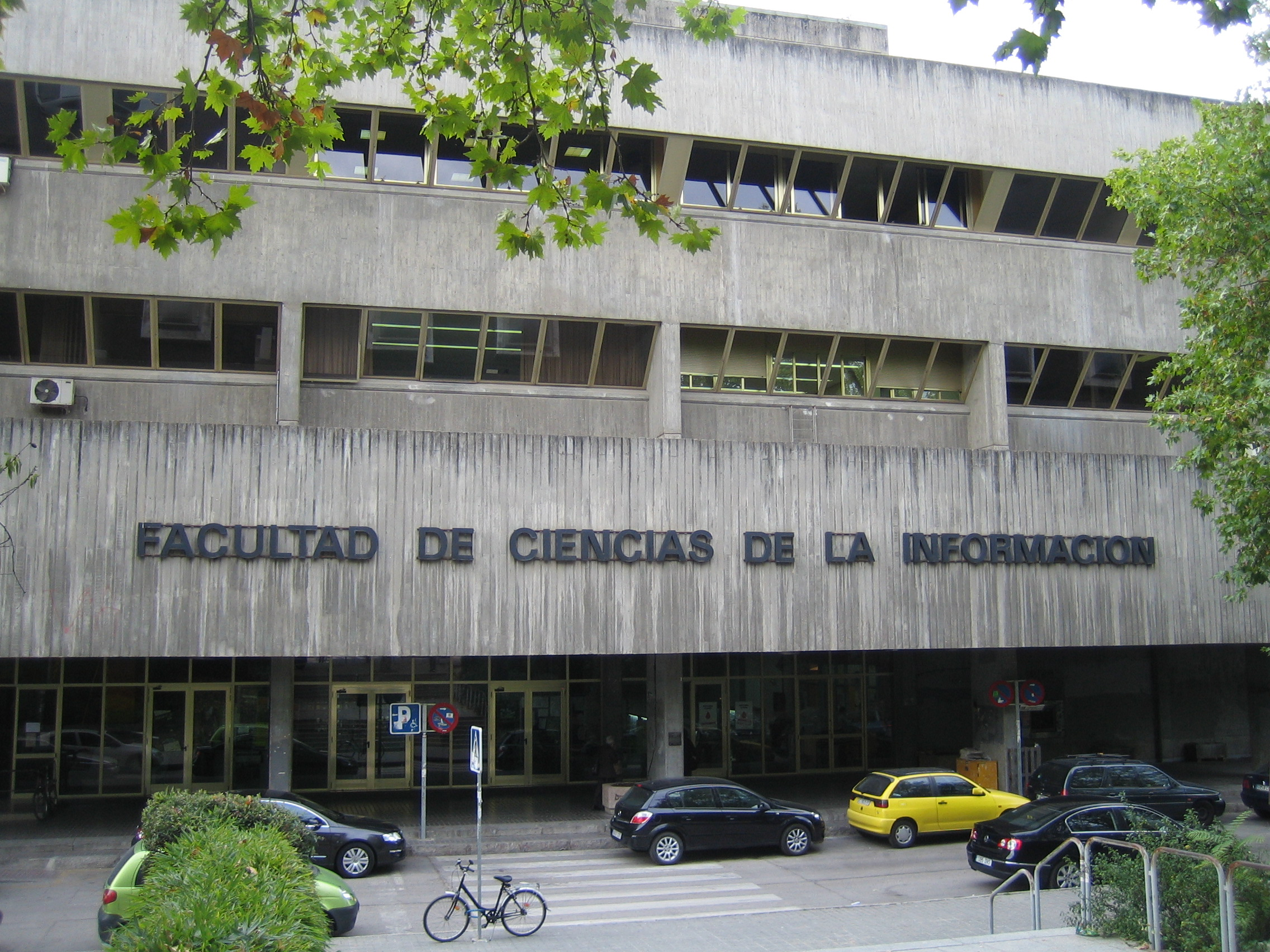
Facultad de Ciencias de la Información, Complutense

Already in Pamplona in the late 1960s Pascual tried his hand as an academic; his old-time mentor Massó, at that time teaching at the Opus Dei managed Universidad de Navarra, arranged for Pascual to be invited to give lectures at Escuela de Periodismo, a brand new established section of the university. The co-operation was terminated once Pascual left Navarre, though rumors about the Opus Dei link continued. Once in Madrid he decided to upgrade his scientific credentials and commenced doctoral research, with focus on media in works of the Second Vatican Council. The thesis, written under the guidance of Pedro Lombardía and titled Trayectoria doctrinal del Concilio Vaticano II sobre la comunicación y sus medios, was accepted cum laude at Universidad Complutense in 1973. A few years later it was published as Los medios de comunicación social en la doctrina de la Iglesia; in the prologue it was boasted as "la monografia más completa que existe – y no sólo en castellano". The reception abroad was rather lukewarm; the critics challenged both methodological basis and conclusions.

Already as a PhD in 1973 Pascual was invited to join the newly created Facultad de Ciencias de Información at Universidad Complutense; he kept teaching there until the mid-1980s. In the late 1970s, when employed as professor adjunto contrado, he was among key figures at the faculty; he vehemently opposed plans to re-format the unit, which would de-emphasize its scientific role and turn it into sort of a job centre, offering specialized courses to students. In the 1980s he rose to a regular professor numerary holder; at that time he was already heading Departamento de Redacción Periodistica. Taking advantage of his role in the realm of Madrid media, he acted in-between Facultad de Ciencias de la Información and Asociación de la Prensa, arranging internship schemes for students. In 1986 Pascual signed a Professor Titular contract with San Pablo CEU, a Catholic educational establishment at that time in transition between Colegio Universitario, affiliated at Complutense, and a stand-alone high education institution. Joining Facultad de Periodismo, he remained head of its Departamento de Redacción Periodística until his passing in 1998.

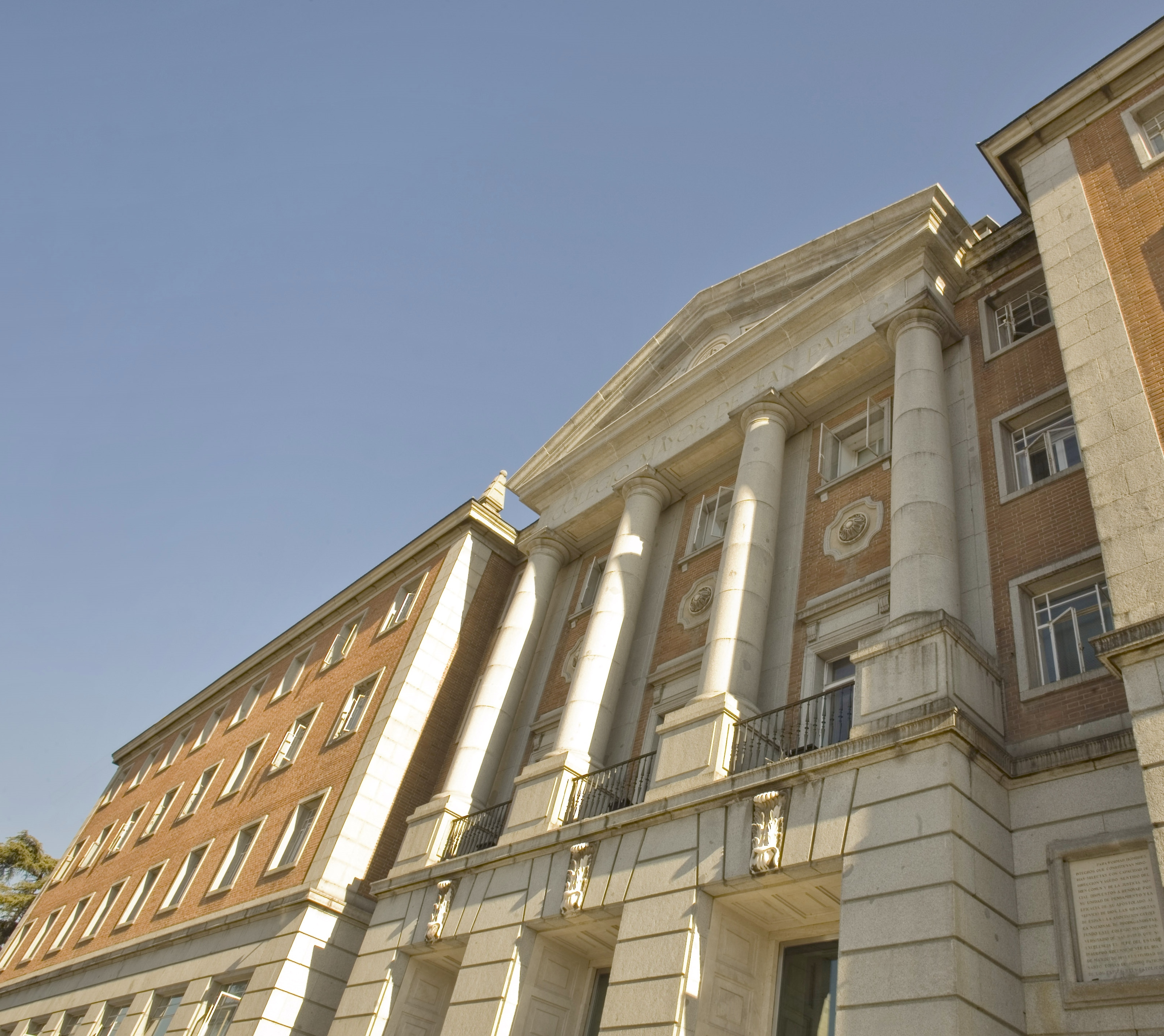
CEU San Pablo, main entrance

Apart from the official academic realm, Pascual remained moderately involved also in semi-scientific educational initiatives sponsored by different institutions, though primarily by the Church. Already in the early 1970s he was active in giving public lectures on media and regional press; by the end of the decade he took part in Jornadas Carlistas de la Prensa in Madrid, organized by Partido Carlista in its Madrid headquarters, and acted as vice-president of the Madrid-based Asociación Cultural Navarra. In the 1980s he was noted for taking part in Jornadas Nacionales de Informadores Religiosos. He did not resume his earlier role of an author; despite having published analytical works in ambitious periodicals like Punta Europa in the 1960s, after the fall of Francoism he did not contribute to corporate or Catholic reviews.

== See also ==
- Carlism
- El Pensamiento Navarro
- Partido Carlista
- Agencia EFE
- Asociación de la Prensa de Madrid
