= S.A. Damm =

Spanish brewery

- Type: Sociedad Anónima
- Industry: Beverage
- Founded: Barcelona, Spain (1876); July 11, 1961
- Founder: August Kuentzmann Damm; Joseph Damm
- Headquarters: Barcelona, Spain
- Area served: Nationwide
- Key people: Demetrio Carceller Coll, owner Demetrio Carceller Arce, President
- Products: Estrella Damm
- Revenue: 2,061,000,000 euro (2023)
- Net income: 130,000,000 euro (2023)
- Number of employees: 5,765 (2023)
- Website: www.damm.cat

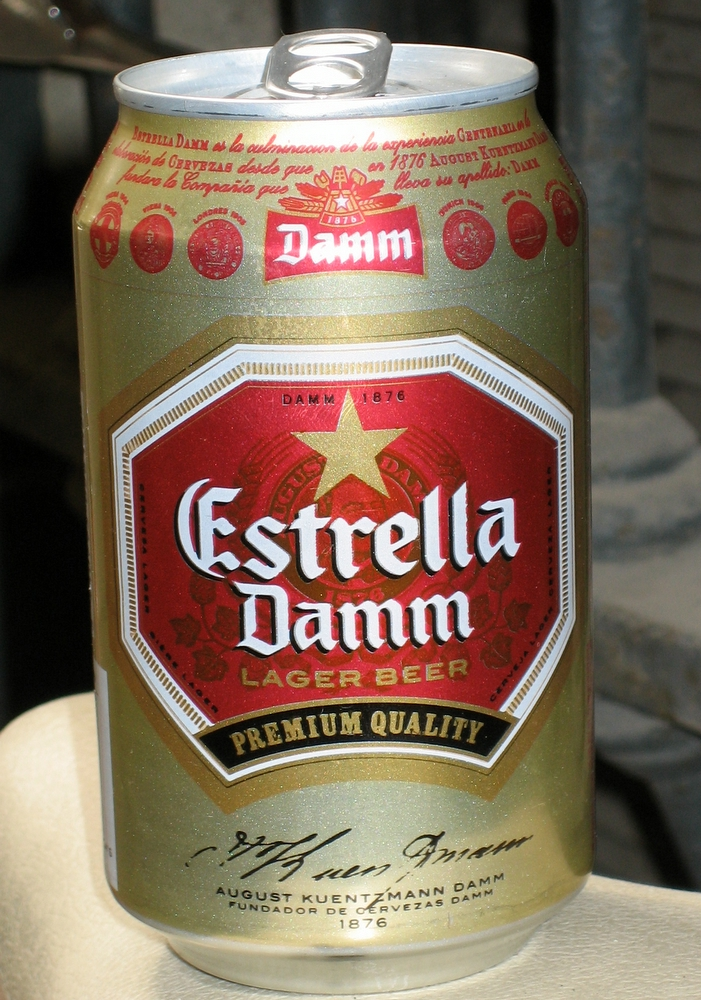
A can of Estrella Damm beer

Sociedad Anónima Damm is a Spanish brewery founded in Barcelona in 1876 by the Alsatian August Kuentzmann Damm and Joseph Damm. It is the main brewery in the city.

== Products ==
Its best known beer products include the following four:

- Estrella Damm, formerly "Estrella Dorada", a pale beer, one of the most popular beers in the Barcelona area. It has been brewed since 1876. Its bottles and caps used to display a characteristic golden star on white ground. Now the star on the cans is on a red background.
- Voll-Damm imitates a German-style Märzen beer. It has more body and a higher alcohol content than Estrella. Its dark-green coloured labels display writing in the Gothic script.
- Xibeca is a low-alcohol grade table-beer coming in large, low-priced one-liter bottles. "Xibeca" was meant to be consumed along with meals, as a cheap substitute for red table wine when the prices of table wines rose at the end of the 1960s. It was very popular among the low-middle class in Catalonia during the 1970s.
- Estrella Levante (es) Clásica is a pilsner lager produced in Espinardo, Murcia. It has been brewed since 1963. Other beers are Especial, Skol, and Punta del Este.

Other Damm products include Inedit, Bock Damm, Free-Damm, A.K. Damm, among others. Damm also produces a range of Gluten-reduced beers under the Daura label, including a Lager and a Märzen.

== Corporate activity ==
In 2018, the shareholding was formed by the Canarian oil company Disa Corporación Petrolífera (33%), owned by the Carceller family, the German food group Dr. Oetker (25%), Seegrund (13.95%), also controlled by the Carceller family and Demetrio Carceller Arce himself (0.083%). The rest of the company's shareholders are several historical families and descendants of the founder, August Kuentzmann Damm, La Moràvia d'Inversions (Armadàs family, 6%) and Boag Valores (Agenjo family, 5%).

In 2022, Carlsberg Marstons Brewing Company announced it will sell the Eagle Brewery in Bedford, England to S.A. Damm. The Eagle Brewery has packaged Estrella Damm since 2010.

== Sponsorship ==
During the heyday of baseball in Spain in the 1950s and 1960s, Damm sponsored a local baseball team, Picadero Damm. During the 1960s, Damm was also known for marketing its beer to all members of the family, including children.

== Shareholders ==
Shareholder	Stockholding
Disa Corporación Petrolífera	27,190%
Dr. Oetker	25,014%
Seegrund B.V.	13,951%
La Moravia D'Inversions, S.A.	6,056%
Boag Valores, S.L.	5,126%

== Stockholdings ==
Society	Interest
Ebro Foods	9,651%
Pescanova	5,000%
