= Voll-Damm =

Spanish beer

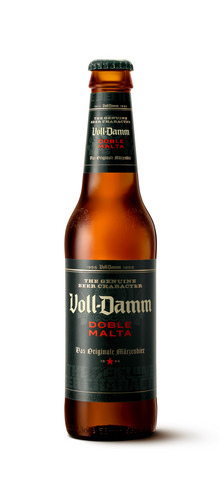
Voll-Damm - 33 cl bottle.

Voll-Damm Doble Malta is a lager and Märzen or Märzenbier-style beer manufactured by S.A. Damm, a brewery in Barcelona, Spain. This robust, full-bodied beer emulates a German-style "Vollbier" and contains 7.2% alcohol by volume. Its dark-green colored labels display writing in the Gothic script.

The name of this Pale Lager comes from the word “voll”, which means full or complete in German, referring to the intense body and flavour of a beer with an original wort extract of 17%.

== Awards ==
- International Beer Competition 2004: gold medal in the Strong Lager category and Best Beer in the competition.
- World Beer Awards 2007: Best Strong Lager.
- Superior Taste Awards 2009: rating with the highest score, Three Stars (“Exceptional” product).
- World Beer Championship Awards 2009: Gold Medal.
- Australian International Beer Awards 2010: Gold Medal.
