= Estrella Damm =

Catalan brand of beer

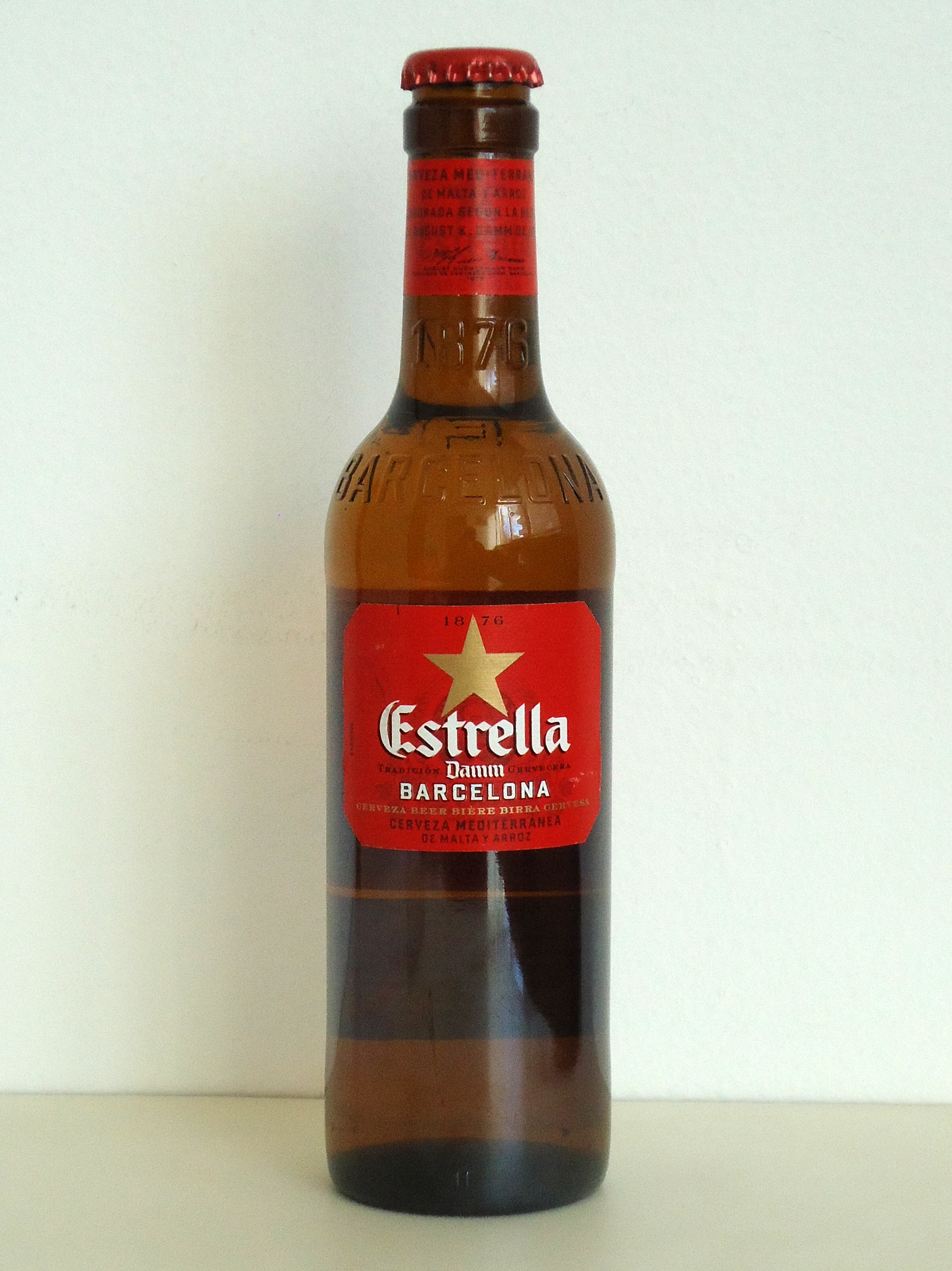
- A 33 cl bottle of Estrella Damm beer
- Manufacturer: S.A. Damm
- Introduced: 1876; 150 years ago
- Alcohol by volume: 5.4%
- Style: Pilsner Lager
- Website: www.estrelladamm.com

Estrella Damm (Spanish: [esˈtɾeʎa ˈðan], Catalan: [əsˈtɾeʎə ˈðam]) is a lager beer brewed in Barcelona, Catalonia, Spain and Bedford, UK. It has existed since 1876, when August Küntzmann Damm founded his brewery in Barcelona, and is the flagship beer of S.A. Damm, a prominent brewery in the city. The brand is the oldest in Catalonia and the name Estrella means "star" in both Catalan and Spanish.

Estrella Damm is available in many countries, including Ireland, Hungary, Palestine, Israel, Australia, Brazil, Costa Rica, Peru, Bulgaria, Canada, Cyprus, Croatia, Greece, Ukraine, Norway, Poland, Estonia, Portugal, Finland, Sweden, South Korea, Taiwan, Georgia, Honduras and the UK in a 4.6% version.

In 2009, the chefs and sommeliers from El Bulli Restaurant created a luxury bottled lager beer called Inedit ("Unprecedented") for Estrella Damm by mixing blend of lager and wheat beer styles, then a combination of barley malt, flavoured with coriander, orange skin and liquorice.

== History ==
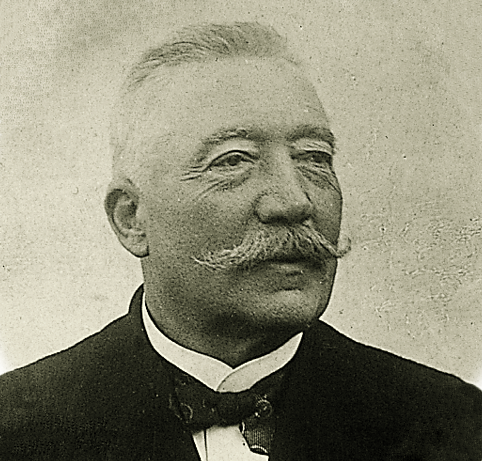
August Küntzmann Damm

Estrella Damm was founded in Barcelona in 1876 by two Alsatians who had arrived to the city fleeing from the consequences of the Franco-Prussian War: August Küntzmann Damm and his cousin Joseph Damm. They founded the Damm Corporation and opened a brewery where they brewed their own beer: a lager lighter than Central European, adapted to the climate and tastes of the Mediterranean, making it known as "Mediterranean lager beer".

It was marketed as "Strasburger Bier", although the symbol, a five-pointed red star, was what made it popular, to the point that people referred to it as "[the one with] the star".

In 1905, after the growth of production, a new factory was inaugurated on Carrer Rosselló, in the heart of Barcelona's Eixample. The factory would be known as "la Bohemia" as a tribute to the brewing area of Central Europe.

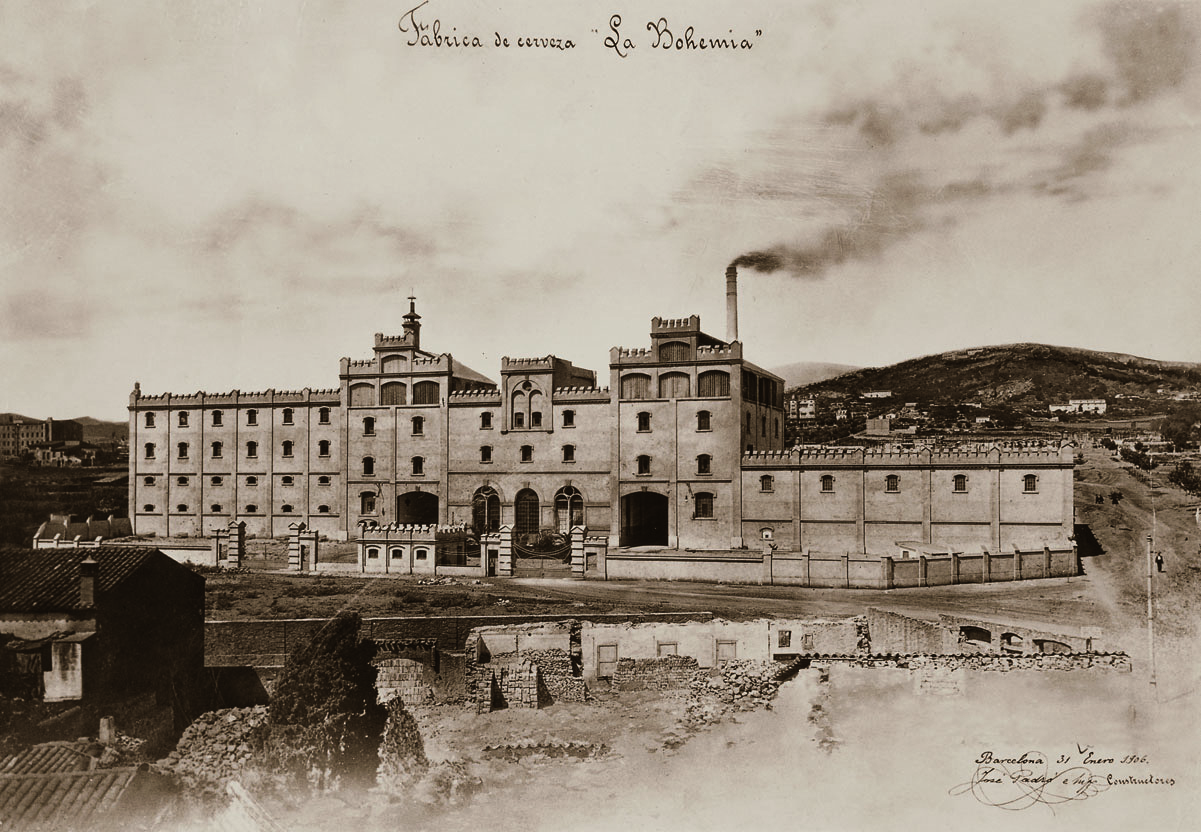
Damm Factory, 1906

By 1907, beer had already received international recognition at trade fairs in Rome, London, Antwerp, Paris, and Genoa.

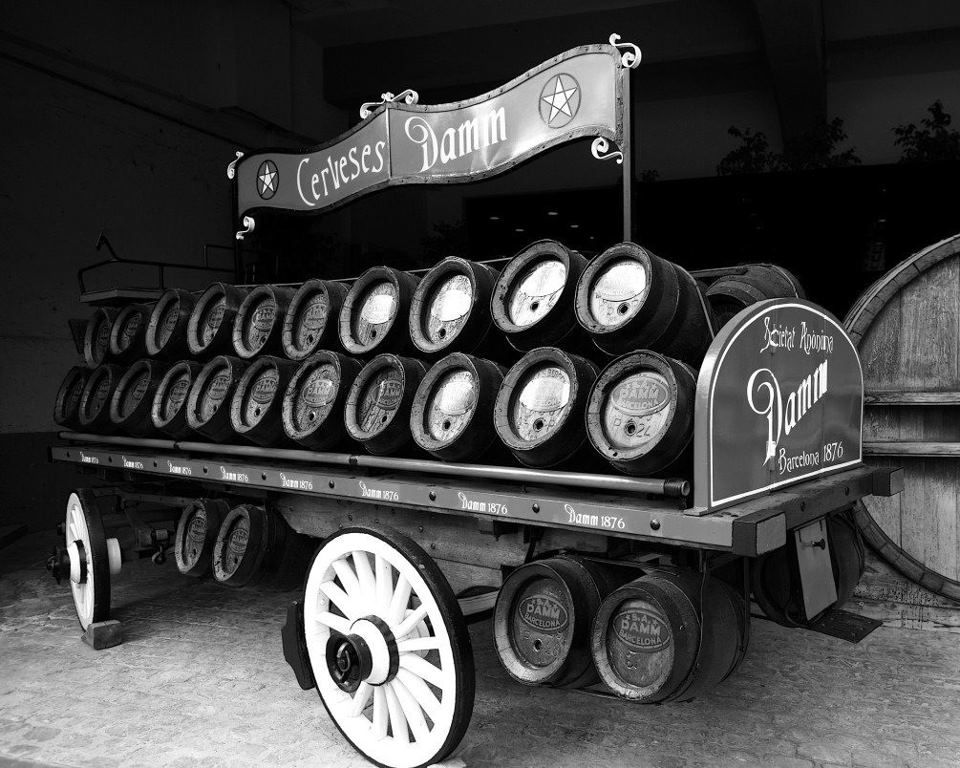
Beer delivery carriage

In 1921 the first name change took place. The star went from being the symbol to the name of the beer, which became known as "Golden Star" (Spanish: Estrella Dorada).

In 1929, the brand took part in the Barcelona International Exposition. At that time, all the distribution was done with horse-drawn carriages. In 1939, in the face of the Franco victory in the Spanish Civil War, the red star on the packaging disappeared, becoming golden.

In 1991 the beer ceased to be called "Estrella Dorada" and became "Estrella Damm". In terms of corporate image, although it kept the gold for the five-pointed star, and regained the red of the original star to make it the corporate colour of the brand.

In 2026, Estrella Dorada was the only beer brewed outside the United Kingdom to win a three-star rating in the Great Taste Awards by the UK publication Guild of Fine Food.

== Gallery ==
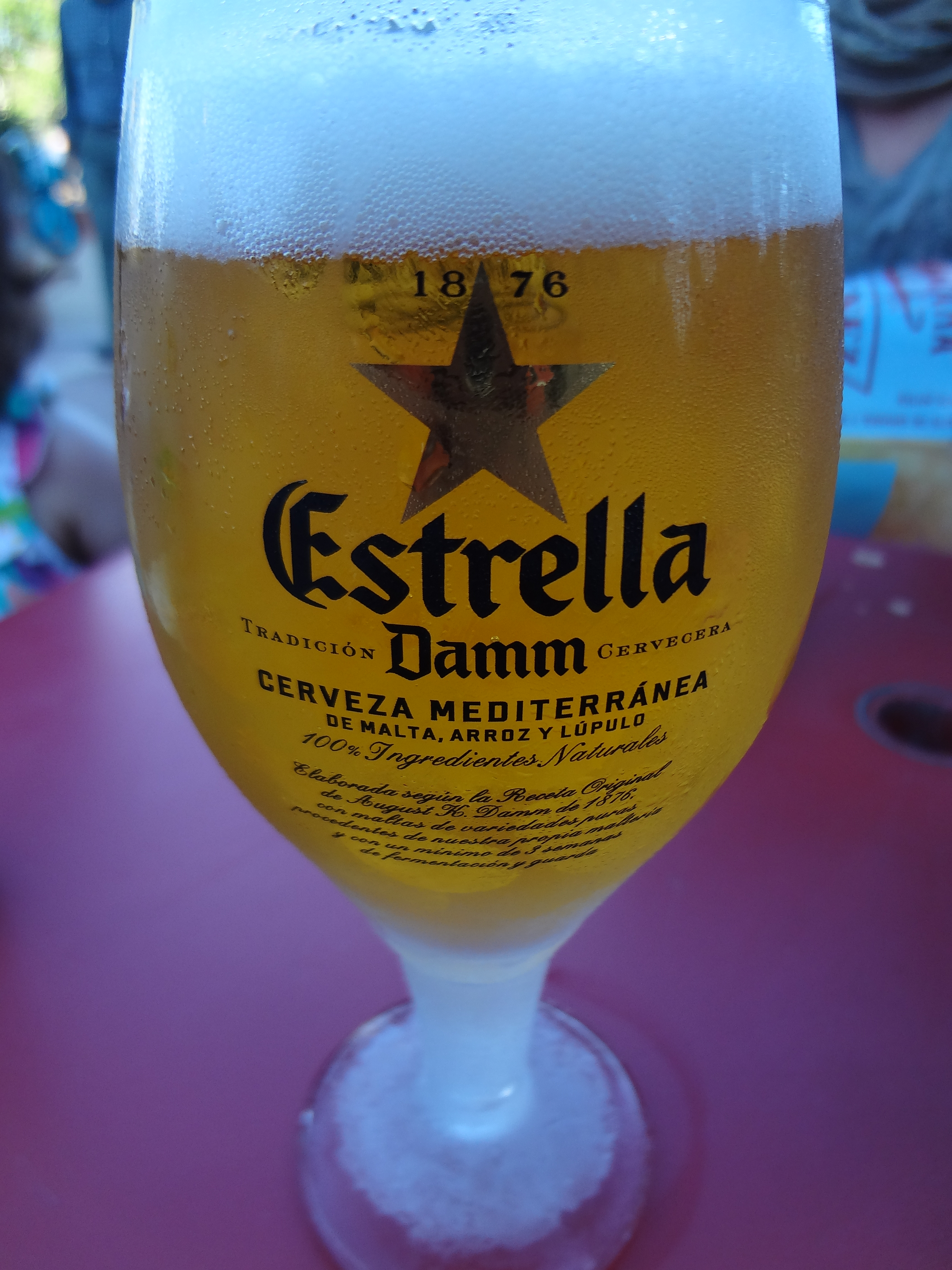
A cold glass of Estrella Damm in Madrid, Spain

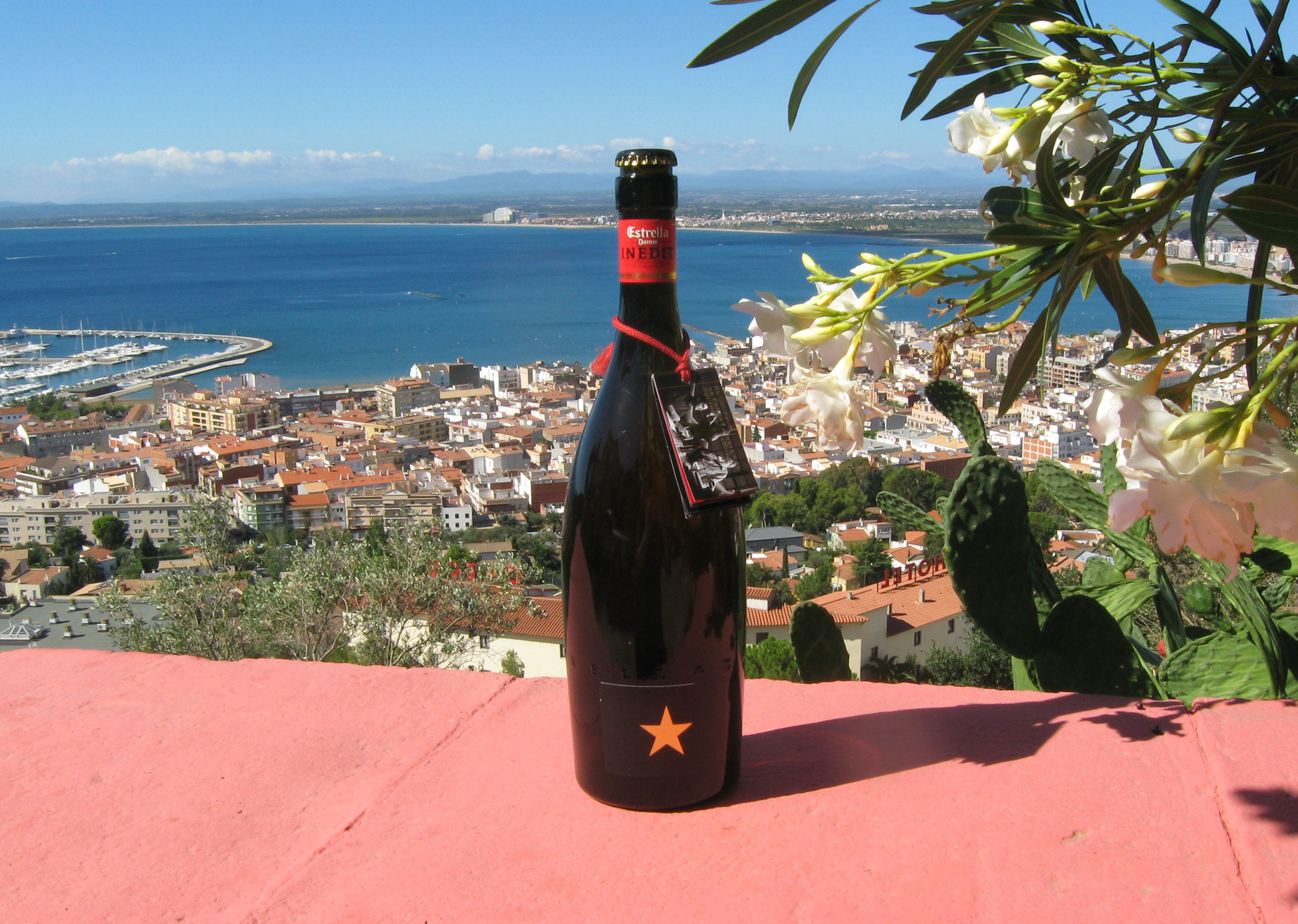
Estrella Damm Inedit

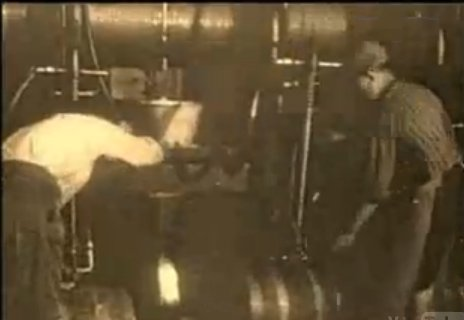
Workers at the brewery in 1920

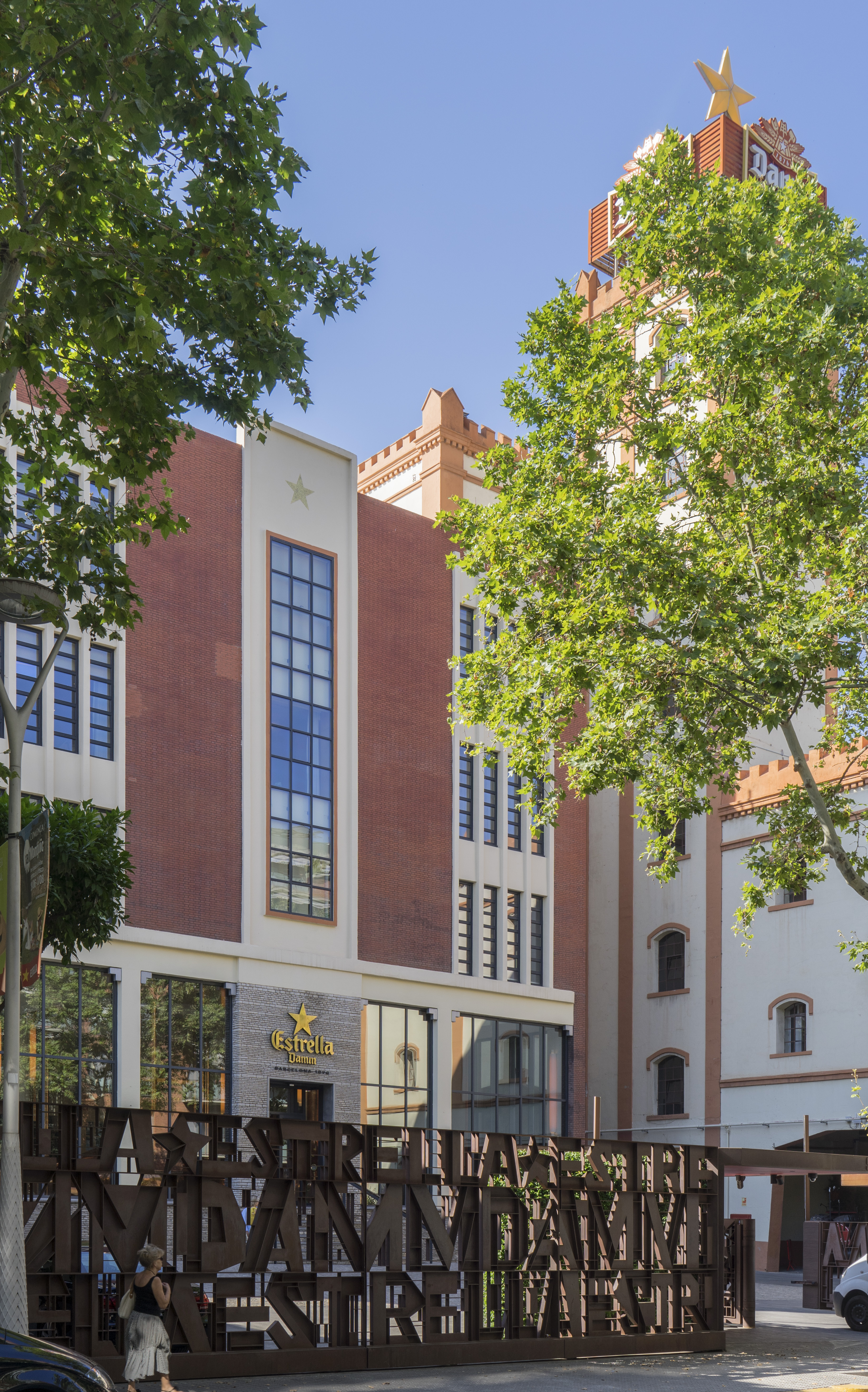
The brewery in Barcelona, Carrer del Rosselló 515
