= Barrau =

Barrau is a surname. Notable people with the surname include:

- Aurélien Barrau (born 1973), French physicist and philosopher
- Caroline de Barrau (1828–1888), French educationalist, feminist, writer and philanthropist
- Enrique Barrau Salado (1912–1961), Spanish paramilitary commander and army officer
- Laureano Barrau (1863–1957), Spanish painter
- Mathieu Barrau (born 1977), French rugby union player
- Théophile Barrau (1848–1913), French sculptor
- Xavier Barrau (born 1982), French footballer

As a forename:

- Barrau de Sescas (fl. 1295–1304), Gascon knight and English admiral

== See also ==
- Family of Barrau
- Monte Barraù, a mountain of Sicily
- Barrau, the native name of Berau Regency in the Berau language
