= Enrique Barrau Salado =

Spanish military officer (1912–1961)

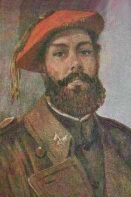
- Born: 1912; Seville, Spain
- Died: 1961 (aged 48–49); Seville
- Occupation: military
- Known for: conspirator, military commander
- Political party: Carlism

Enrique Barrau Salado (1912-1961) was a Spanish military officer and a Carlist militant. He is particularly known for his role in the Andalusian anti-Republican Traditionalist conspiracy of the mid-1930s, his engagement in the July 1936 coup in Seville, and then for his position as a requeté commander in the Tercio Virgen de los Reyes battalion during the Spanish Civil War. Afterwards he became a professional officer in the army and retired in the rank of a major. After the war he did not engage openly in politics, yet among the Andalusian Carlists he remained an iconic point of reference. Some fictitious literary characters have been modeled after him.

== Family and youth ==
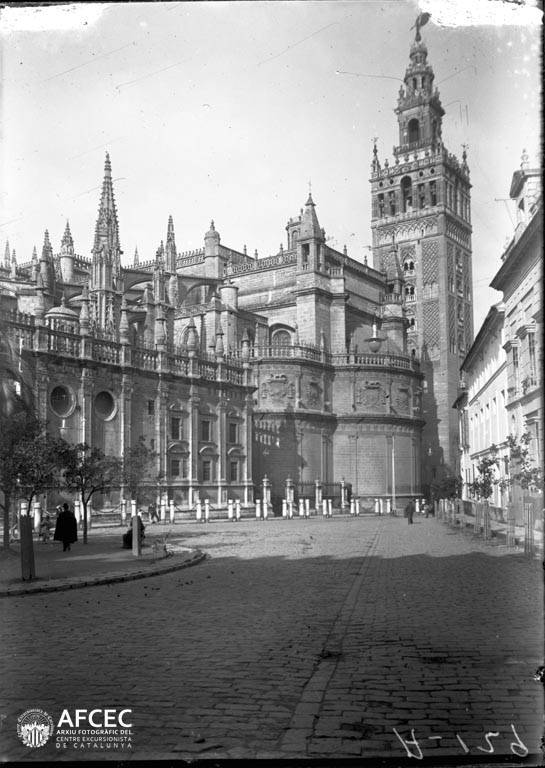
Seville, 1910s

The French noble family of Barrau was traditionally related to Toulouse; some of its representatives served as military among Hundred Thousand Sons of St. Louis, during the anti-liberal French intervention in Spain in the 1820s. It is unclear whether the great-grandfather of Enrique, Jules Barrau, was among them, yet his Toulouse-born son and Enrique’s paternal grandfather, Leoncio Barrau Galinier (1837-1924), studied in Seville and became a civil engineer specializing in roads. He grew to a distinguished member of the hispalense bourgeoisie; in the mid-1870s he was CEO of the Alcalá railway line, while in the mid-1880s he was member of the board and manager of Caminos de Hierro de Este de España. Barrau Galinier co-purchased the defunct San Agustín convent and turned it into a food market, operational until 1900. In the early 20th century he engaged financially in Banco Díez y Vergara, managed an undefined "minerales" business and remained CEO of Ferrocarril de Sevilla, Alcalá, Carmona. He was a cultured person; apart from owning Teatro San Fernando and Teatro Cervantes, he also published a booklet on the San Agustín convent.

Barrau Galinier’s son and Enrique’s father, Enrique Barrau Grande (1871-1930), studied medicine and is mentioned either as "medico-cirujano" or "medico oculista", yet there is no information whether he has ever practiced. He inherited shares in his father’s railway business and in the 1920s served as manager of Compañía S.A.C. He married Carmen Salado Iznaga (1879-1957), daughter to a respected Seville doctor; she was cousin to the later rector of the Seville University, Mariano Mota Salado. The couple had 4 children, apart from the oldest Enrique also Leoncio, Carmen and Antonio. Barrau Grande died in mysterious circumstances, a day after having sold majority shares in C.S.A.C., the railway company that he owned and managed.

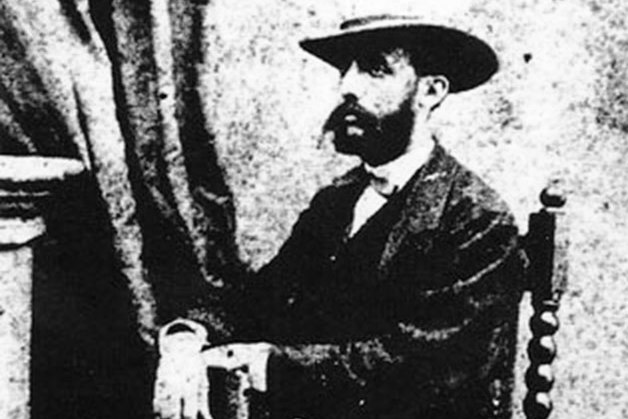
maternal grandfather

None of the sources consulted provides information on childhood and early education of Enrique, apart that he was strongly influenced by his maternal Salado family. Given his tumultuous youth, punctuated by detentions and arrests, it is not clear whether he pursued a university education. In 1933-1934 as Alférez de Complimento he was undergoing military training in 8. Regimiento de Caballería in Seville. There is no information on his professional engagements prior to outbreak of the civil war. Already after the conflict, in 1940, Barrau married Petra García Vélez (died 1973); there is nothing closer known either about her or her family. The couple had 5 children: Enrique, Petra, Aurelio, Antonio and Carmen Barrau García. None of them became a public figure, though Antonio and Aurelio remained active as Carlists until the 21st century; Antonio was in executive of the Andalusian CTC, while Aurelio remained active in the post-war requeté organisation; his daughter and Enrique’s granddaughter, Angeles Barrau Lena, acted as the Andalusian CTC treasurer.

== Republic ==
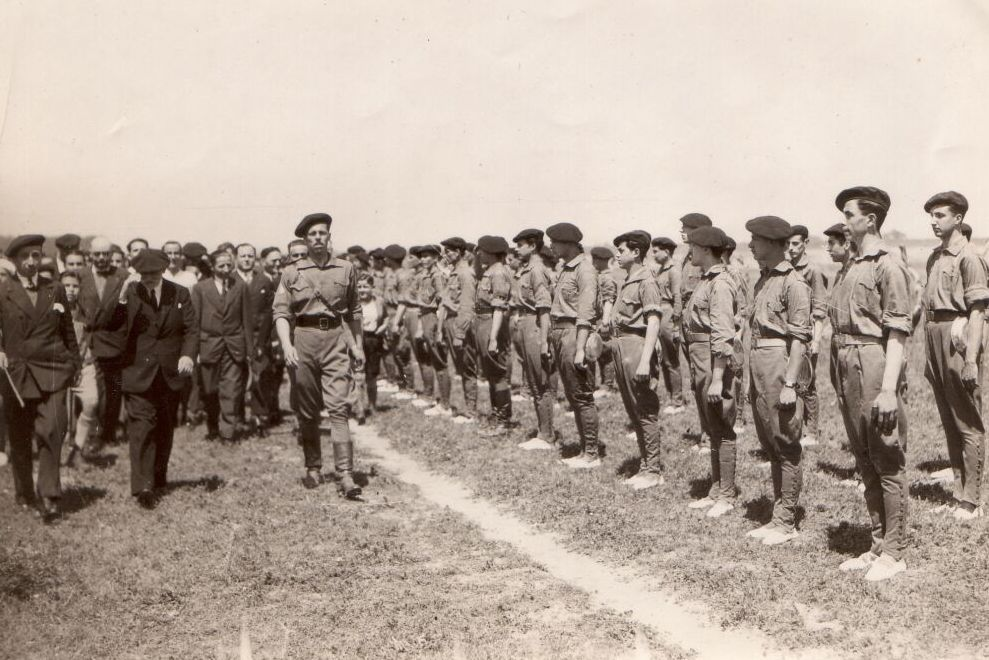
drill of Andalusian requeté

There is nothing known of political preferences of Barrau’s paternal ancestors, though they might have nurtured some legitimist sympathies; the maternal ones were Traditionalists of Integrist leaning. In 1930, when aged 17, the adolescent Enrique was introduced by his uncle José Salado Yznaga to Manuel Fal Conde, the Integrist leader in Andalusia; the two were later to develop sort of a father-son bond. Barrau followed Fal to the united Carlist organization, Comunión Tradicionalista, and in 1932 he was appointed secretario of its newly created Seville youth branch, Juventud Tradicionalista. In the summer of 1932 he was engaged in the Sanjurjo coup, but there are no details available. Barrau was then detained and though shortly released, a string of incarcerations followed in December 1932, January 1933 and April 1933, the last case related to an anti-governmental demonstration. He was among the longest-incarcerated Carlists of the time.

Praised by Fal as one of the most promising muchachos of the movement, in 1933 Barrau became secretario of Jefatura Regional de Andalucia; he accompanied Fal during his local party engagements and during longer trips across Spain, e.g. to take part in a grand Carlist rally in Zumarraga. Also in 1933 he started to organize a Seville branch of the Carlist paramilitary structure, requeté. Following a year of hectic efforts the organization was strong enough to stage an impressive display of strength at the Quintillo estate, when some 600 uniformed members performed drills and military exercises; Barrau was among key speakers during the event. Also in 1934 he co-organized sending some Seville requetés to military training in Rome, yet it is not clear whether he went himself. At the time he was already a member of Junta Directiva of the Seville CT branch.

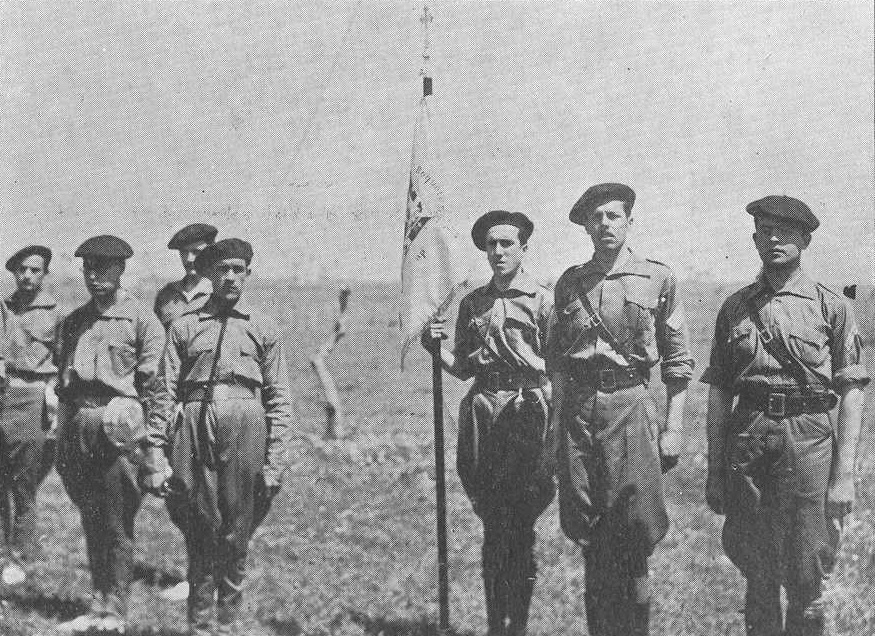
Barrau (2fR) at Quintillo, 1934

Since 1935 Barrau was formally the commander of Primer Requeté de Sevilla, a battalion-strength paramilitary unit subordinated to the Andalusian requeté commander, Luis Redondo. In 1936 the Carlist claimant Alfonso Carlos acknowledged his efforts with Corbata de la Orden de la Legitimidad Proscrita. In the spring of 1936 Barrau was actively engaged in Carlist efforts to mount an anti-Republican coup; according to the plan, prior to takeover of key Madrid premises distractive risings were to be staged in few spots, among them in Andalusia and Extremadura near the Portuguese frontier. Under supervision of professional officers, Redondo and Ignacio Romero Osborne, Barrau was busy gathering requeté volunteers in the Andalusian countryside. The coup was eventually called off as in May the Republican security uncovered part of the scheme and detained some of those involved, yet Barrau was not among them.

== Civil war ==
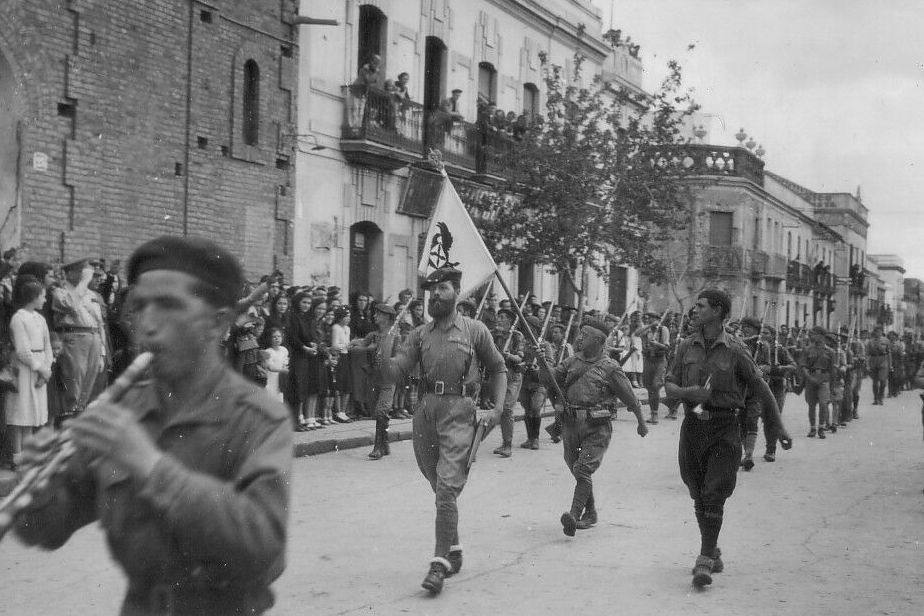
Barrau in Peñarroya-Pueblonuevo

In early July 1936 the Barrau brothers were heavily involved in local talks between the Carlists and the military, aimed at seizing power in Seville. Around mid-day of July 18 Enrique Barrau commanded a requeté detachment which tried to take control of the gobierno civil building, but the assailants failed and withdrew. They returned in early afternoon as infantry support for rebel army artillery sub-units; following some skirmishes, the premises were seized shortly afterwards. During following days Barrau’s home served as concentration point for requetés; he led his men in combat against workers’ militia for control over the Seville districts (Macarena, San Julián, San Marcos) and in repressive actions.

In August–October Barrau was involved in numerous requeté operations in western Andalusia. It appears that he commanded one of 3 companies of a battalion, headed by professional officers; first Luis Redondo and then José María García Paredes. Initially the unit operated west of Seville in the Huelva province, suffocating pockets of republican resistance in Sierra de Aracena and the mining region of Rio Tinto; then it was shuttled towards the Málaga province and as part of so-called "Columna Redondo" took part in fightings for Saucejo. Already when the unit was renamed to Tercio Virgen de los Reyes, Barrau was engaged in operations on the Cordobese front in the Peñarroya-Pueblonuevo sector; in October requetés seized the Anarchist stronghold of Bujalance and set their headquarters there.

In November 1936 Barrau was recalled from the line to join Fal in Getafe and Leganés; then in Toledo he took part in planning of Real Academia Militar de Requetés, perhaps to become one of its commanders. The scheme ended up in disaster, as Franco blocked it and got Fal expelled from the country; however, there is no information about any measures taken against Barrau. In early 1937 he was back in line, taking part in combat first for Málaga and in the summer again in the Bujalance-Lopera region. He was fiercely hostile to the Franco-imposed political unification and declared utter loyalty to the sidelined Fal. Later during the year he contemplated "war against the Blues", "in desperation" complained about Carlist marginalisation and even staged minor demonstrations.

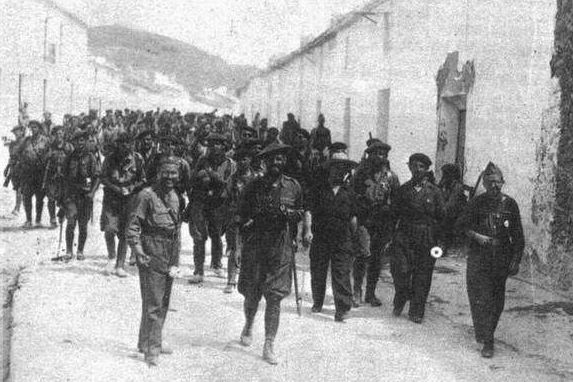
Barrau in Cuevas del Becerro

Despite displays of dissent, in December 1937 Barrau was declared in "empleo de Capitán", acting captain. In early 1938 his unit was moved to Extremadura and took part in combat for Valle de la Serena, the Zújar river and Castuera. In July he was wounded, according to some sources heavily, and spent some time in the rear. Following re-establishment, in January 1939 he returned to line and commanded a company in what was named "4. Batallón-Bandera de FET de las JONS de Sevilla"; at Peñarroya, Valsequillo and Belmez the unit opposed the last Republican offensive of the conflict. Barrau ended the war as a highly decorated officer, with two Medallas de Sufrimiento por la Patria, Medalla de Mérito Militar, Cruz de la Orden de San Hermenegildo and collective decorations.

== Francoism ==
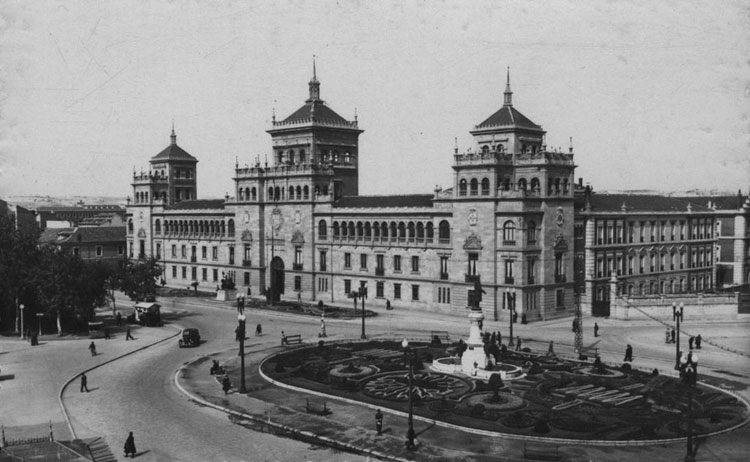
cavalry Academy, Valladolid

In the summer of 1939 Barrau decided to commence a professional military service and in July he was admitted to ranks with "empleo inmediato", immediate employment. Though formally he was merely "teniente de complemento de caballería", a reserve cavalry lieutenant, he got his wartime provisional promotion to captain acknowledged with seniority from May 25, 1938. Already as a capitán in 1940 he was admitted to Academia de Caballería in Valladolid. None of the sources consulted provides details on his military education in the academy and it is not known when he graduated, though most likely it occurred in the early 1940s. The 1942 graduation album claims that as a professional officer he was promoted to captain with seniority from March 31, 1939. There is almost no information on Barrau’s military postings, except that in the early 1950s he was assigned to Regimento de Caballería Cazadores Sagunto no. 7 in Seville. He did not ascend much along the rank ladder and was promoted only once; around 1952 he ascended from captain to comandante (major). Reasons for such a moderate career of a previously distinguished officer are not known. At some point he passed from active service to reserve, attached to the 2. Región Militar (Seville); his last rank was comandante de caballería.

As a professional military in the Francoist Spain Barrau was not in position to cultivate his Traditionalist political preferences publicly. None of historiographic monographs on Carlism of the post-war era mentions him as engaged in buildup of party structures or propaganda activities. In private he remained in touch with prestigious personalities of Andalusian Carlism, like his former commander Luis Redondo and the Carlist Jefe Delegado, Manuel Fal Conde, who both had him in extremely high regard. Due to his wartime deeds and cheerful, unassuming, lively personality he became sort of iconic point of reference for the Seville Traditionalists; also the young carlohuguistas, who nurtured own political plans centred on Don Carlos Hugo, considered it a must for the prince to see Barrau when visiting Seville in the late 1950s.

Carlist standard

In 1959 Barrau was among co-organizers of the 25th anniversary of the Quintillo parade, which due to its independent Carlist flavor caused unease within local administration. In 1960 the Quintillo ceremony, with preparations already under way, was explicitly banned by the civil governor, Hermenegildo Altozano Moraleda. Barrau stormed into his office but failed to get the decision reversed; afterwards he photocopied the order and distributed a lengthy account of the incident. In spite of it, his very formal funeral was attended by numerous high military; the widow received Orden de la Legitimidad Proscrita. Dubbed "un capitán español del viejo estilo de los tercios de Flandes o de Lepanto", until today among Traditionalists Barrau remains an iconic Andalusian requeté figure. In his 2020 novel Linea de fuego Arturo Pérez-Reverte modeled one of the protagonists, captain Coll de Rei, on Barrau.

== See also ==
- Carlism
- Requeté

== Footnotes ==
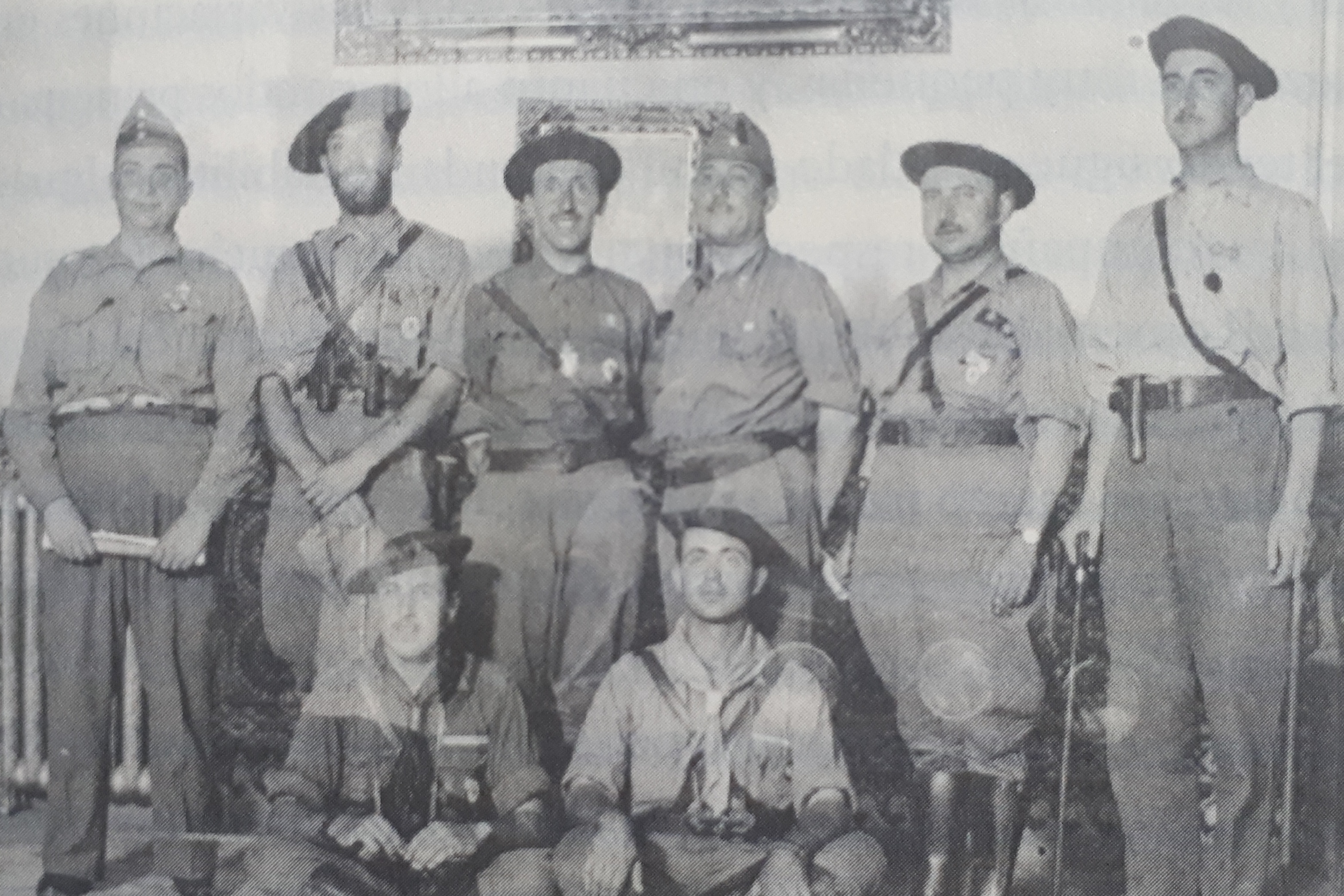
commanders of Andalusian requete, Barrau standing 2fL
