= Requeté =

Spanish Paramilitary organization

Requetés
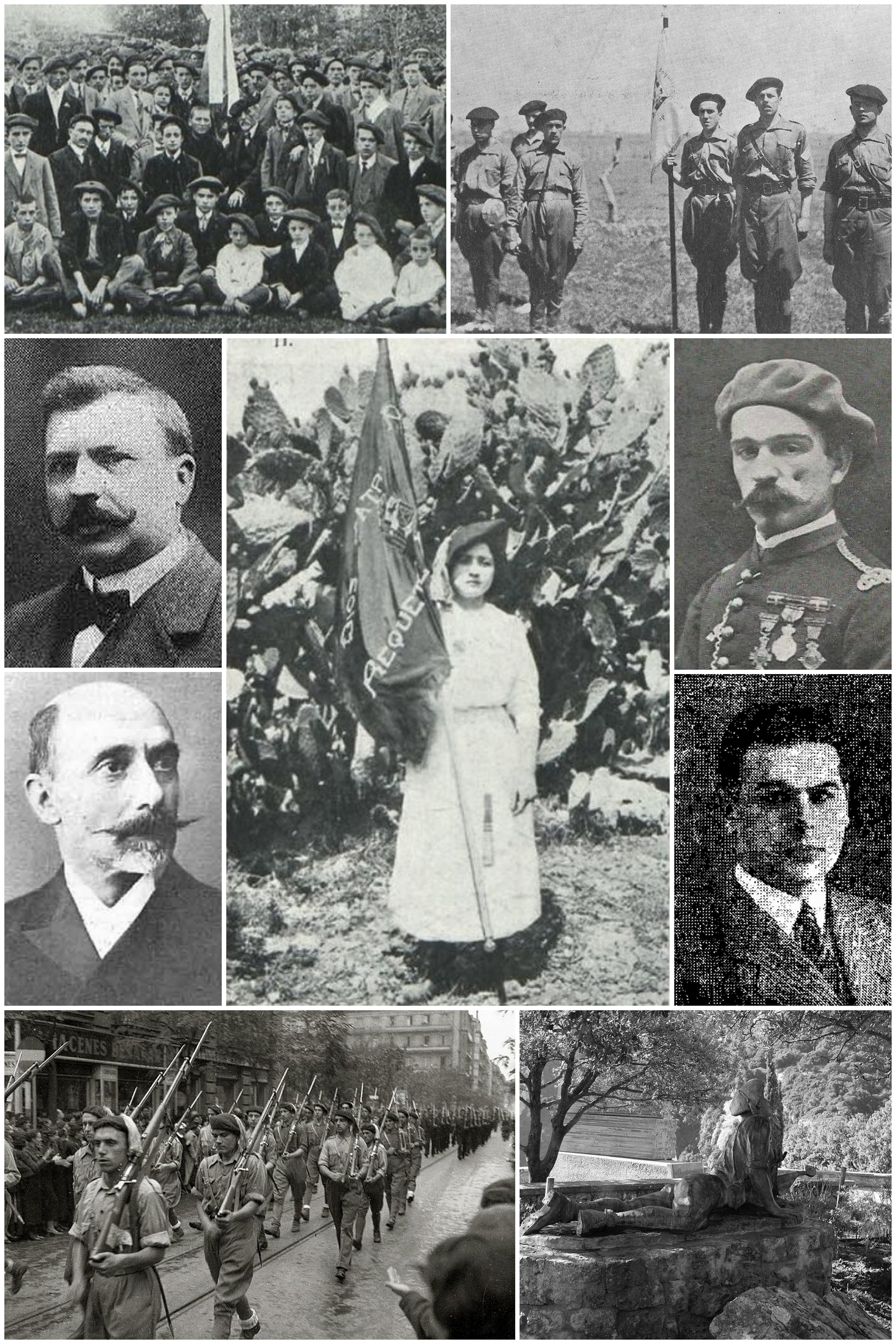
- Clockwise from top left: Olot, late Restoration; Andalusia, Second Republic; Pérez Najera; Zamanillo; monument to Requeté, Montserrat; San Sebastián, Spanish Civil War; Llorens; Roma. Centre: standard-bearer
- Active: 1900s–1970s
- Country: Spain
- Type: Militia
- Engagements: Spanish Civil War

The Requeté (Spanish: [rekeˈte]; Catalan: Requetè, Basque: Errekete) was a Carlist organization, at times with paramilitary units, that operated between the mid-1900s and the early 1970s, though exact dates are not clear.

The Requeté formula differed over the decades, and according to its changes, the history of the movement falls into several phases: 1) heterogeneous youth organisation (mid-1900s to mid-1910s); 2) urban street-fighting squads (mid-1910s to early 1920s); 3) dormant structure with no particular direction (early 1920s to early 1930s); 4) paramilitary party militia (1931–1936); 5) army shock units (1936–1939); 6) party branch in-between youth and ex-combatant organisation (1940s–1950s); 7) internal "order of the faithful" (1960s).

The Requeté played a major role in Spanish history in the early months of the Civil War, when its units were critical for ensuring Nationalist advantage on some key frontline sections. It is not clear whether there is any Requeté network operational today.

== Background ==
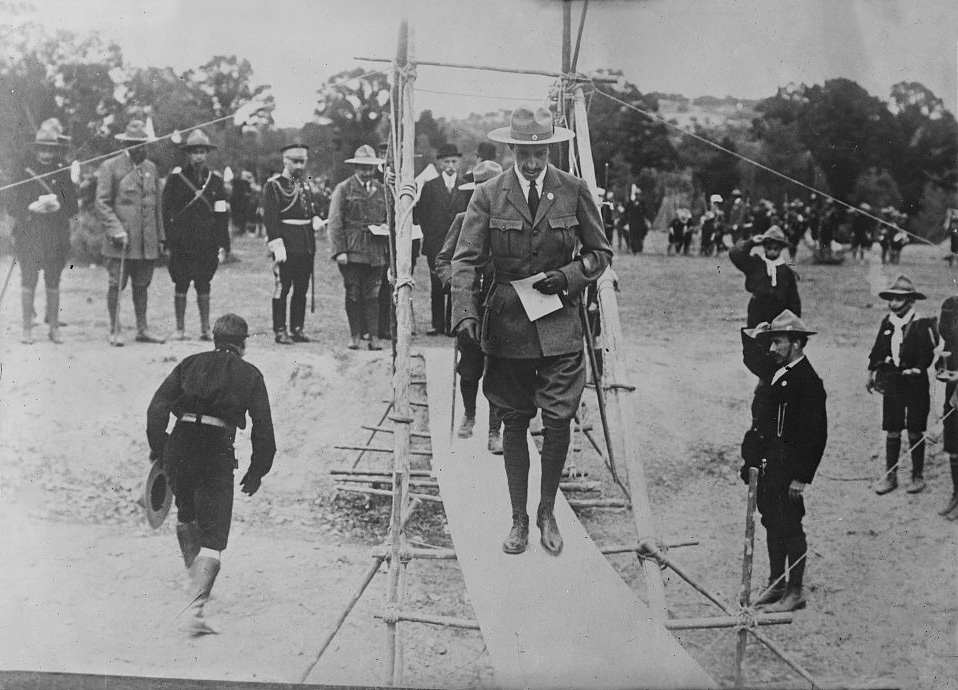
Early scouting, Spain

Apart from academic associations, until the end of the 19th century there were no youth organisations in Spain. They started to emerge in the early 1900s as branches of various political movements; in 1903, a first youth socialist group appeared in Bilbao, and in 1906, Federación de Juventudes Socialistas staged its national congress. In 1904, the Basque nationalists set up Juventud Vasca. The same year in Barcelona the radical republicans founded Juventud Republicana, operating under a colloquial name of "jóvenes bárbaros"; in 1911 they formed Federación de Juventudes Radicales. In the early 1910s, youth conservative Maurista groups started to emerge. At that time also non-political organizations began to appear; the first Boy Scouts group was recorded in 1911, in its Catalanized version as "Exploradores de Barcelona" born in 1912. Though in the early 20th century there were already various sporting, tourist, or other leisure associations operational in Spain, they were oriented towards young adult males and were not specifically intended to group minors.

The first Carlist youth formations started to emerge in the early 1900s, but their origins are highly unclear. Groups named Batallones de la Juventud were recorded in Madrid (1902) and Barcelona (1903) when staging marches and parades, apparently intended to demonstrate prowess of Traditionalism and perhaps also to intimidate political enemies. Some scholars see these initiatives not as part of freshly born political mobilization among the urban youth, but rather as a continuation of the old Carlist "tradition of direct action". They claim that "abortive resumption of violence at the turn of the century" – i.e. a series of minor disturbances, staged mostly in Catalonia in 1900 – as their important consequence produced loose "armed squads of Carlists", which engaged in petty urban violence during the following years. These gangs were easily suppressed by forces of order, yet their emergence demonstrated a new phenomenon: mostly urban Carlist militancy, independent of official movement structures and oriented towards street violence.

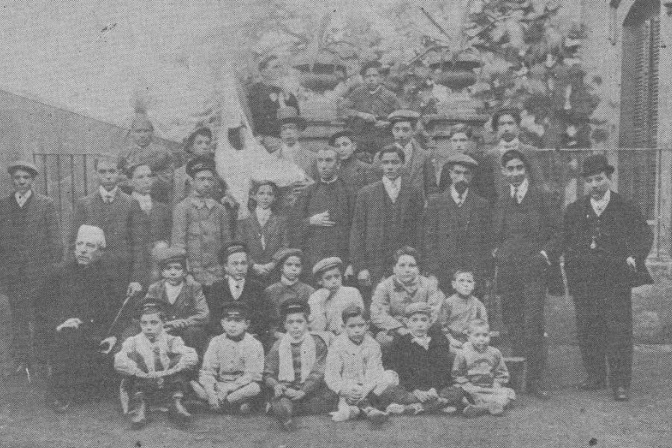
Carlist youth, Barceloneta

It is not clear whether the birth of Juventud Carlista, a party youth organisation, was supposed to take emerging violence under control or was rather an attempt to institutionalize and enhance the violent strategy. Its first branch was set up at unspecified time in Madrid; since 1903 the organization operated in Barcelona and proved particularly dynamic in the urban Catalan milieu. It soon turned out that Catalonia in general and Barcelona in particular by far outpaced other regions in terms of mobilization of Carlist youth. At that time the region was rapidly undergoing massive social transformation, turning from a mountainous rural area to a region dominated by the industrialized, urban coastal belt; profound social changes proved fertile soil for the growth of new urban phenomena. Mushrooming and loosely organized groups of Juventud engaged in military drills; they also got increasingly involved in street clashes with hit-squads related to left-wing politics, especially the Radicals and the Anarchists.

== Emergence (1907) ==
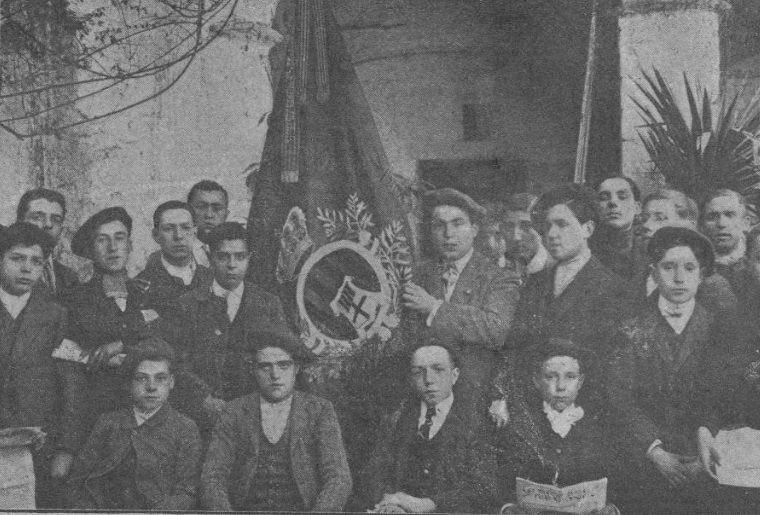
Manresa requeté

Exact origins of requeté organization are not clear. In the early 1900s loose Carlist groups in Catalonia referred to themselves as "requeté", a name that dates back to the crack battalion of Navarre in the First Carlist War, distinguished by general Zumalacarregui for their gallantry. Also, some correspondents of Traditionalist press used the term as their pen-name. It seems that the first attempts to create a Carlism-flavored framework for juvenile and youth activities were related to the city of Manresa. In 1907, a local review, Lo Mestre Titas, was referred to as "portavoz del requeté escolar" and present-day scholars also consider it an unofficial mouthpiece of local juvenile Carlism. Historians often repeat a theory that the first organization named "Requeté" was set up in Manresa in 1907 by a 37-year-old publisher and propagandist Juan María Roma. The first press reference is dated 1908, and it points to "Requeté Carlí de Manresa", but does not mention Roma. The principal objective of the organisation was defined as "fem propaganda" and called "joves carlins de Catalunya" to follow suit. Indeed, soon groupings from other locations like Sabadell or Girona notified setup of their own requeté branches.

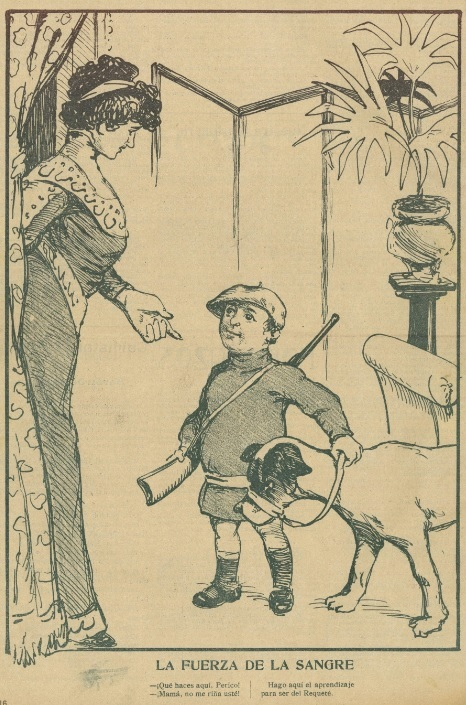
"Mom, I am training to become requeté"

There is not a single case of provincial or regional Carlist juntas having been mentioned as involved in the buildup of the requeté cells. It seems that their emergence was related to or inspired by Juventud Carlista; its members were at times referred to as "older brothers" of "jovencitos" from requeté, requeté was approached as sort of preparatory stage for entry into Juventud and at times the organization was named "Requeté de la Juventud Carlista". Sporadically requeté was explicitly referred to as "organized under the Juventud auspices". Most geographical references to requeté were related either to Catalonia or Levante. Since 1910 there were notes related also to Madrid, since 1911 to Andalusia, Aragón, Galicia, Old Castile and Vascongadas, and since 1912 to Navarre and Canarias. However, in various parts of Spain, local cells were perceived as an emulation of "‘Requeté’ al estilo de Barcelona".

A party document from somewhat later period claims that originally requeté was intended for older children and younger teenagers aged 12–16, who could not enlist to Juventudes; other notes specify the age limits as 8–15. Historians describe the organization of its constitutive phase as "pacífico y infantil", similar to later Pelayos of the 1930s rather than to a paramilitary organisation. Indeed, press from the era used to describe requeté members as "jovenes", "jovencitos", "chicos", "niños", "infantiles", "muchachos", or "chiquillos". Purpose and objectives of requeté were described vaguely as "mature, learn, and train to be a soldier of God" though growing in peace, but also "prepared for war". Early notes suggest that a requeté member had to be a good Christian, but did not necessarily have to be a Carlist. Initially some naming confusion ensued; members of the organization could have been named "requetés", "requeténs" or "requetenistas".

== Early phase (1907–1913) ==
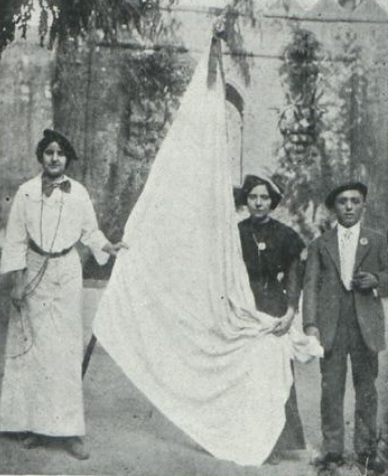
Abanderadas, Barcelona

In 1909, the Catalan Junta Regional asked Roma to prepare a formal set of regulations that would define the requeté modus operandi; there is no immediate follow-up known. In 1911, some press titles published an anonymous ordinance draft; it is unlikely that it was adopted, let alone implemented. It appears that separate requeté groups operated on their own with no provincial or regional network organized; until the mid-1910s there was no co-coordinative body or executive ever mentioned. Membership remains unclear; according to the friendly press, there were over 100 associates in Barcelona in 1910 and 130 in Lleida; a 1911 rally in Terrasa gathered 200 youth, while in the town of Valls there were 50 members enlisted in 1912. A hardly credible note claims that a rally in Valencia was attended by 800 requetés. Though the draft rulebook envisioned only boys as members, photos demonstrate that there were also girls present, some sources refer to "requeté de damas blancas" and adolescent females served even as standard-bearers.

Larger of more affluent groups boasted of their own standards, usually received during pompous ceremonies; in Catalonia the first such case was noted in 1910, while in Valencia in 1911. At least basic governing structures started to emerge, usually with the president, but at times also with the vice-president, treasurer, secretary, librarian, or members of junta directiva. Larger local groups started to set-up specialized sub-sections, like sección dramática, de caridad, excursionista, instructiva, ciclista, recreativa, militar, alpina, politico-religiosa, de prensa y propaganda, or sección de sport. None of the sources consulted confirms existence of dedicated premises and it is not clear whether members of local cells met in private, in Carlist círculos or outdoors. Since 1911 there are vague references to common gear, usually red or blue berets, but prior to 1913 there was no explicit note of a shirt or other part of uniform identified.

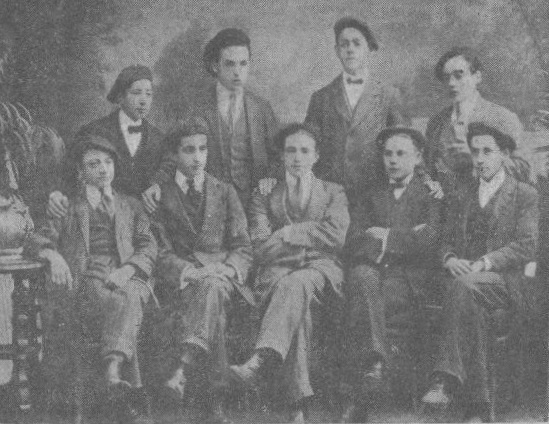
Junta de requeté, Barcelona

Personal information on leadership is scattered, fragmented, and imprecise. Circumstantial evidence suggests that Juan María Roma played a major, if not key role in organization of early requeté. Another Catalan Carlist leader associated was Dalmacio Iglesias, allegedly bent on turning requeté into shock troops designed to take part in street fightings. In Valencia, the major person related was a retired artilleryman, in the Carlist ranks known as general, Joaquín Llorens; already in 1910 some press titles referred to "requeté d’en Llorens." Among leaders of local groups, in 1910 the president of Barcelona requeté was named Martin Gibernau; in 1911 it was first Fernando Bertrán and then Valentin Estefanell. Still in 1911, Joaquín Font y Fargas was named "director del requeté jaimista". In 1912, the elected president of Barcelona requeté organisation was Julian Oliver. In other major centers, Francisco Alcón Orrico presided over the Valencia branch and Joaquín Castaneda over the Madrid one.

== Main activities (1910s) ==
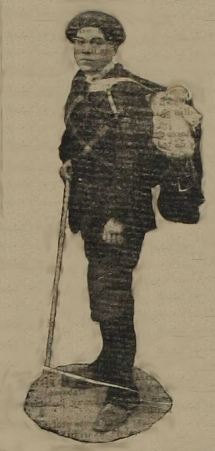
Requeté on excursion

One of the key requeté activities was propaganda. The members were selling party periodicals or pamphlets with Carlist Cortes speeches, distributing free press, leafleting, or tearing down street materials of competitive groups. Propaganda tours might have included small musical bands or parades. Various cultural initiatives were also flavored with Traditionalist propagandistic zeal. They included literary evenings, at times covering also musical pieces, choirs, reading poetry, infantile recitations, journalistic competitions, theatrical performances, dance, music and other "bellas artes". Some gatherings turned into multicultural events. A related field was education; some circles organized lectures and at one point there was even an "Academia del Requeté" set up.

Standard requeté practice was taking part in religious events, usually field masses, parades, or pilgrimages. Members of the group were supposed to practice to become good Christians, e.g. they were expected to take holy communion at least monthly; however, there is no explicit information identified on abstinence vows taken, e.g. these related to tobacco or alcohol. Many requeté cells embarked on charity, reported as engaged in social work among the poor or the sick or involved in other initiatives. In some cells, there were specific charity sections set up.

Among outdoor activities, numerous excursions were usually formatted in-between tourism, religion, and propaganda. Marching in organized, disciplined and military-like formations with standards and at times with accompanying music, the members walked to sanctuaries like Montserrat or Poblet; single individuals embarked on longer journeys. There are fairly frequent press notes about requeté members in military foot drills. A recurring theme is shooting practice. Last but not least, requetés were noted as involved in sports. The discipline mentioned in particular was cycling; football seemed much less popular, and a single case of a climbing group was noted. Trophies involved were named "Copa Requeté".

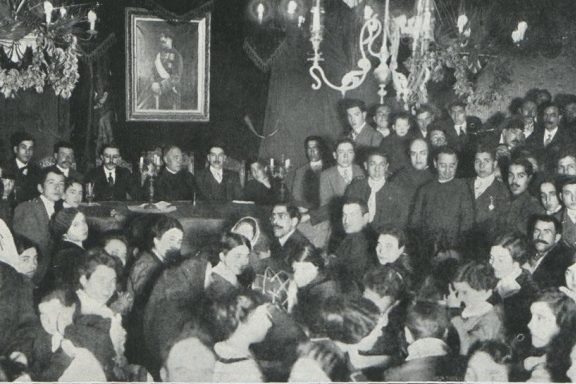
Tarragona requeté

Since 1909, the Republican press reported numerous incidents of requeté-related violence, ranging from insulting other juveniles to provocative marches, assaults on the premises of left-wing newspapers and organizations or attempts to stop tram circulation in order to enforce observance of religious holidays. Hostile press agonized about "juvenil y bizarro ejército" trained for "asesinato, el robo y el incendio", educated in hate and "ready to die and to kill"; in the best case, they were "creatures 8 to 10 years, cigarettes in their mouths and cards in their hands". Progressist authors warned about "burlesca comedia de una guerra civil" and in every second report, "requeté" was paired with "browning". There were requeté militants detained by security or court-martialled, clashes with police and Guardia Civil, arms confiscations, or administrative measures applied by civil governors against specific circulos. The 1911 street battle in Sant Feliú de Llobregat, which left few people dead, might have involved some requeté members. Violence was reported not only in Catalonia but also in the Vascongadas. The Carlist press, when discussing violence, presented requeté as preventing assaults on churches or ensuring safety during Carlist rallies.

== Attempted overhaul (1913) ==
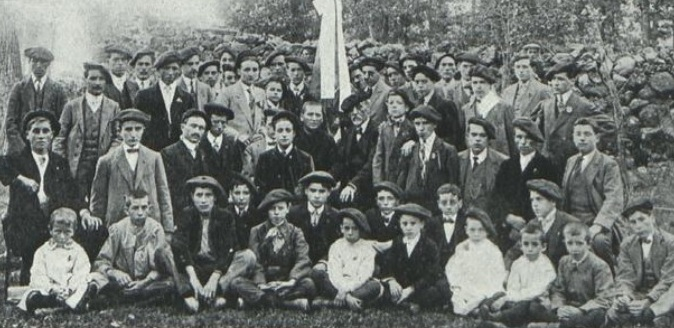
Olot requeté

Requeté of the early 1910s was a heterogeneous formation hosting 10-year-old children and young men, its activities falling between culture and street violence. At times differences led to comical confusion, but there was no uniform framework emerging. Some historians suggest that the impulse to reform the organization came from the new Carlist claimant, Don Jaime. Reportedly impressed by the 1908-established the French monarchist formation Camelots du Roi, he intended to build a similar structure. Already in 1910 he discussed the plan with Llorens, though his first public references to requeté are dated 1911. General guidelines for a new requeté formula were issued in late 1912; the news soon became public and the first known draft of the re-alignment plan was dated in early 1913. The same year, the 59-year-old Llorens was nominated head of Comisíon de Requetés, one of 10 sub-sections of the party executive, Junta Superior Central. This was also the first moment when Requeté was officially recognized by the party as its branch.

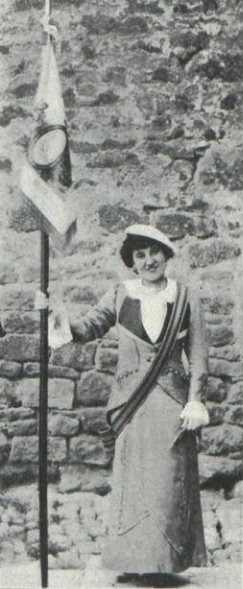
Abanderada, Pamplona

Llorens intended to build an organization of disciplined, trained young men, structured in units and capable of co-ordinated action, with a view of forming a future "ejército". He intended to name them "Grupos de Defensa" and Requeté and Juventud were supposed to be sort of training or logistics arrangements. They were to form a network with various command layers, and the entire structure was to remain under the supervision of Carlist politicians. A draft attributed to Llorens envisioned that Requeté were to be split into a younger and an older section. A 16-man squad was to be a basic unit 4 squads would make a sección and 2 sections would make a company, all commanded by individuals of specific ranks. The draft envisioned also insignia and a gray-colored uniform.

In 1913, a body named Junta Central Tradicionalista Organizadora de los Requetes de Cataluña was set up, with Matías Llorens Palau nominated as its president. The Junta issued a number of guidelines intended to discipline and unite existing requeté cells and proceeded with the nomination of provincial juntas. Apparently a rulebook has been edited and published. Since late 1913, there were sporadic news of dissolving existing structures and creating escuadras as outlined in manuals issued by Junta Organizadora; at times there was only "reorganización" of specific branches mentioned. The same year first requeté units were reported as appearing in public uniforms in gear "modelo Llorens".

The exact outcome of the reform attempted by Llorens is not clear. It is known that "Grupos de Defensa" have never emerged and that both Requeté and Juventud continued to operate as autonomous structures. Junta Central Organizadora proved to be a rather short-lived body, as there is no news of its existence after 1914; instead, there were sporadic references to Comisión de Requetés, active until 1919. To what extent the local requeté cells were indeed transformed into structured, disciplined units focused on paramilitary activity remains unknown. Some scholars suggest that the attempted reform was largely a failure.

== Post-reform organization (1913–1920) ==
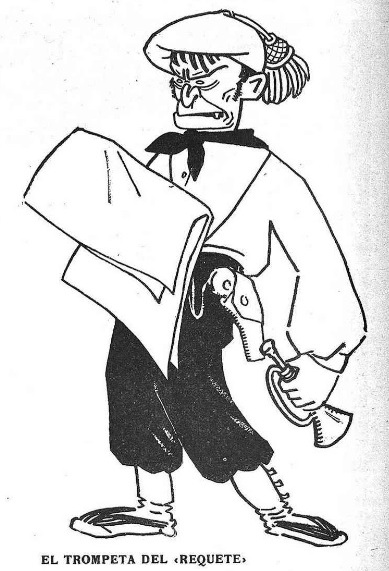
Requeté ridiculed

The reform attempted by Llorens coincided with peak of requeté activity during the Restoration era; in the late 1910s it was in steady decline. It seems that at the time Requeté was increasingly getting formatted as a paramilitary organization, as news on related violence clearly prevail over information on cultural, leisure or charity activities, dominant in the early part of the decade. Carlist youth was reported as engaged in street altercations with other groupings, especially Jóvenes Bárbaros of the Radicals; however, there were also news about clashes with Catalanist and Basque nationalist youth. Not few of these incidents involved use of firearms and produced casualties, including fatal ones. Since 1915 there are news on automobiles used during shooting incidents. It is usually impossible to tell who started violence, especially given all groups behaved provocatively. However, it is clear that in many cases it was the requeté youth which assaulted premises deemed hostile or tried to break down rallies of the opposition. There is also increasingly frequent information on requeté groups sabotaging electoral action, e.g. attempting to destroy ballot boxes.

Slightly ahead of the Great War the Requeté activity assumed a visibly pro-German and anti-French tone. When the president of France Raymond Poincaré travelled by train to Madrid, in Catalonia he was greeted with "¡Viva España y Alemania!" paintings, signed by Requeté. During the hostilities, when the question of Spanish stand versus the conflict remained a heated political issue, requeté militants provided protection to rallies advancing either neutralist (effectively pro-German) or openly pro-German and pro-Austrian narrative. During a popular feast in Barcelona they assaulted participants who carried cartoons mocking the Kaiser and in 1917 some politicians already suggested that the organization was actually financed by Germany; as there has never been a shadow of evidence unearthed, the claim was most likely entirely unsubstantiated.

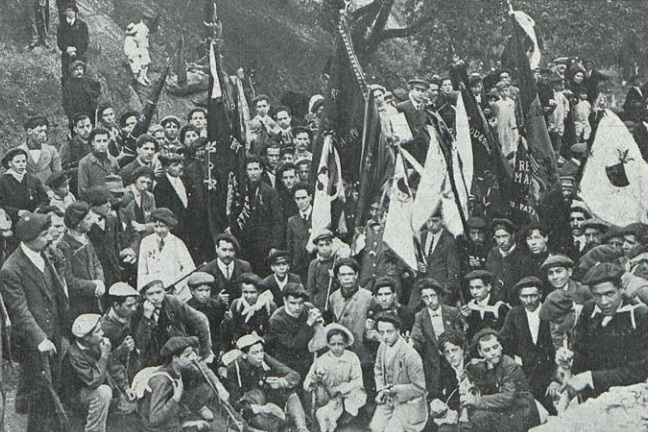
Sant Feliu requeté

There is information suggesting that fairly frequently requeté appeared uniformed, though it seems also that police or Guardia Civil approached half-military gear as threat to public order, and organized groups of adolescent boys were permitted to operate – e.g. to exercise marches – only when unarmed and in plain clothes. Partial and sporadic data provides evidence that at least some elements of organized structure, including military ranks and hierarchical command layers, have been introduced; there are also unconfirmed news about expulsions from the organization. Relations with the official political Traditionalist hierarchy remain unclear; there are cases of militant youth exalting regional leadership reported, but there are also cases of Carlist deputies voicing unease and even suggesting dissolution of specific requeté cells. In the late 1910s no political party heavyweights seemed particularly related to the organisation. Llorens ceased to appear as engaged, especially that due to the Germanophile stand, he found himself conflicted with the claimant. In 1920 Don Jaime nominated Juan Pérez Nájera, a 75-year-old military, the jefé of all requeté in Spain.

== Dormant phase (1920–1930) ==
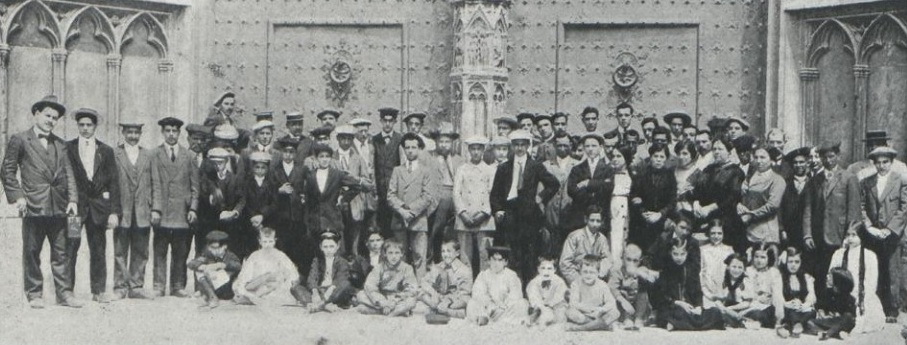
Valls requeté

Since the mid-1910s the activity of Requeté was in steady decline, but at the turn of the decades the organisation entered the period of lethargy and hibernation, by scholars dubbed "disengagement and paralysis" or "irremisible decadencia". It is not clear whether the crisis was related to any single factor, like half-completed Llorens’ reform, grave political crisis of Carlism during the Mellista breakup of 1919, inefficiency of Najera and the new leadership, or limitations on public activity imposed by the Primo de Rivera dictatorship of 1923. It is neither known to what extent the deteriorating militancy resulted rather from other processes, like general downturn of Carlism in Catalonia, outpaced by republican, Catalanist or Anarchist organizations.

In the early 1920s it might have appeared that the Carlist urban militancy was re-channelled from youth organizations like Requeté or Juventud to syndicalist groupings, or that some sort of synergy between two types of organizations was near. Numerous proletarian members of Carlist-affiliated Sindicatos Libres involved in violent clashes with competitive labor unions were former requetés; the first identified requeté killed during inter-syndicalist violence was José Torrecasana Valentine. However, Sindicatos Libres failed to gain dynamics and stagnated. In 1922 Don Jaime asked the Carlist political leader Marqués de Villores to revitalize Requeté and Juventudes into "action groups", but there is no tangible outcome of this initiative known. While in 1923 Catalonia saw another surge of violence bordering collapse of public order, requeté contributed little; at times noted for clashes of their organized squads with the police, they were increasingly frequently on the defeated end during skirmishes with left-wing hit-squads. Having declared 3 members dead, in June the Barcelona requeté promised to retaliate and take bold action. At that time there were also first references to requeté against the Fascist background.

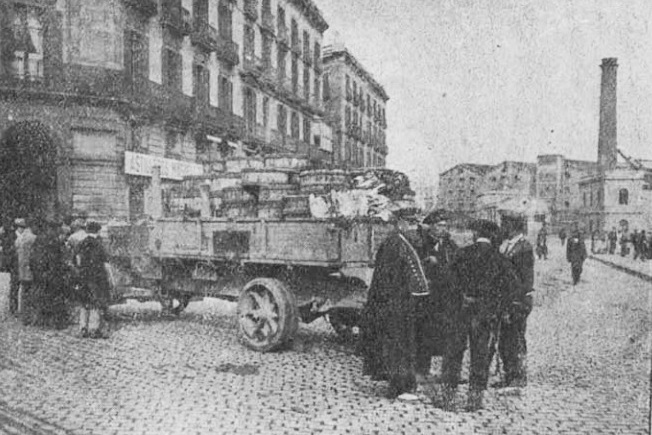
Rare picture of requeté in action, strike unrest in Barcelona

Dictatorship of Primo de Rivera cracked down on street violence and restored calm. Since then there are no news on requeté-related disturbances, and if noted in the press, they were mentioned e.g. in relation to pilgrimages, issuing bulletins, sending protest letters or taking part in religious services. In some provinces requeté activity ceased completely. In unclear circumstances a Barcelona branch declared itself dissolved and renamed to "Los Mosqueteros de Jaime III". Relations with the primoderiverista militia Somatén remained ambiguous. In the early 1920s the two formations used to confront each other in violent fist-fights; later it was reported that some individuals held double membership. Since the mid-1920s numerous requeté members entered Somatén, especially that such a move was officially recommended by de Villores. In 1927–1928 the regime suspected requeté of planning a coup d'état and some detentions followed, e.g. this of the Barcelona requeté president Felix Oliveras y Cots. Indeed, some Catalan Carlist hotheads engaged in anti-Primo conspiracy, promptly dismantled by the party executive.

== Reformatting (1930–1931) ==
Carlist standard

When the 1930 fall of the Primo regime removed limitations on public activity the Carlists voiced their relief after the end of "seis añox largos de silencio impuestos por una Dictadura". Scholars claim that the entire movement was at its lowest point ever, though none of the sources consulted provides estimates as to the state of Requeté at the moment. The information available suggests the organization languished as few isolated and rather inactive cells, engaged mostly in resumption of party propaganda and religious activities; there were attempts to return to the old format with renewed excursionist or sporting bids. Most news of requeté activity, scarce as they were, came traditionally either from Catalonia or Levante. The latter region was somewhat privileged as this is where the party leader, marqués de Villores, resided; at times he appeared in public with the local Valencian requeté leader, Pelayo Beltrán Ripollés.

In May 1930 Don Jaime called the Carlist leaders to Paris and set up Comité de Acción. Historians speculate that as the situation in Spain was getting increasingly fragile, the claimant acted with a view to future violent developments; some maintain that "revitalization of shock groups was key concern" for him at the time. However, there was no follow up visible. A study on Catalan Carlism of the early 1930s does not contain a single paragraph on any attempt to revitalize the requeté structures in the region in 1930–1931; the only evidence of focus on the organization was Cruz de la Legitimidad Proscrita, the high Carlist honor the claimant conferred upon Beltrán. When in April 1931 the monarchy collapsed and Republic was declared, Requeté continued to stagnate with no apparent direction. In the summer of 1931 the Carlist executive engaged in talks with the Alfonsists and army generals about an anti-Republican coup, but given shortage of resources, they realized ruritanian nature of any such attempt.

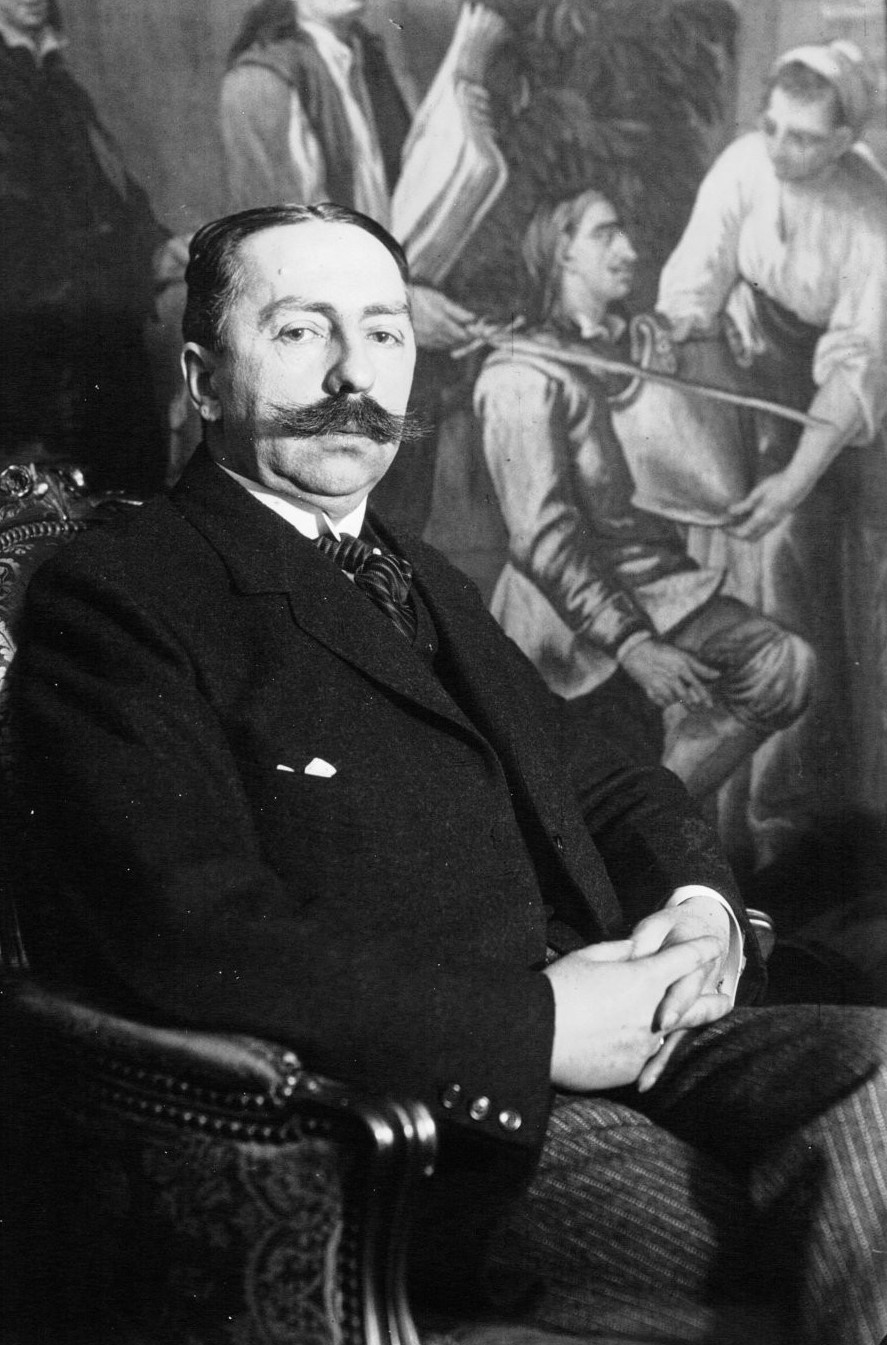
Don Jaime

In late summer of 1931 Comité decided to focus on expansion and re-formatting of Requeté. Some scholars claim it was to act "para impulsor un eventual movimiento insurreccional" and to become volunteer army able to rise and control some territory in "the old 19th-century style"; however, there is also opinion that the organization was to maintain "eminently defensive character". Any remnants of juvenile features were abandoned and the organization was to group fit, young adult males. Its centre of gravity was to be moved from Catalonia and Levante to the vasco-navarrese area, which implied reliance on rural and small-town militancy rather than on large urban centers like Barcelona or Valencia. Requeté was to acquire a format in-between a para-military and a militia organisation, its members to be disciplined, structured, trained in combat and use of firearms; professional army officers were to supervise the change. The decisions adopted in late 1931 set an entirely new course and in short time they were to transform Requeté into a totally new formation, with no resemblance either to juvenile format from its early phase or to urban street-fight squads from the late 1910s.

== New Requeté (1931–1936) ==
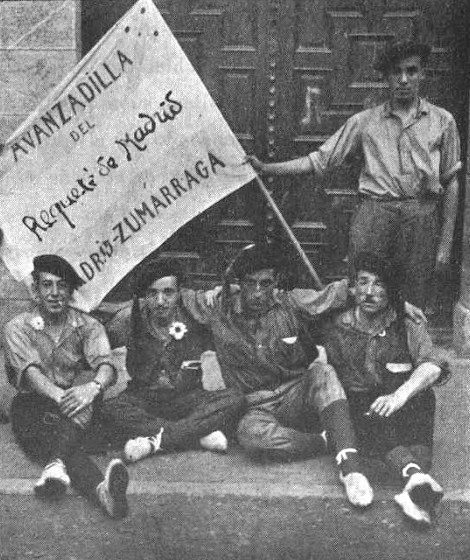
Madrid requeté, 1933

The history of Requeté during the Republic falls into three phases. The first one is associated with Colonel Eugenio Sanz de Lerín, appointed the Requeté chief instructor in 1931. In a few months he managed to develop a Navarrese network of 2,000 men, grouped into newly established 10-men sub-units named decurias; its immediate objective was protection of religious buildings. With assistance of local parish priests, by year-end the force at least tripled. However, in early 1932 Requeté suffered a number of setbacks. Comité de Acción was disbanded, key instructors were detained by the security, and some cells were outlawed by administration. Most decurias got "practically dismantled"; apart from disorganized Navarrese network, elsewhere Requeté were restricted to harmless groups in big cities. During a meeting of military conspirators prior to the August 1932 Sanjurjada Sanz de Lerín offered 6,000 requetés, but scholars dismiss this claim as pure fantasy. Beyond Navarre there was barely any growth and even in Catalonia requeté was much of a disappointment.

The second phase is associated with suspended army colonel, Enrique Varela; in late 1932 he was appointed Jefé Nacional of Requeté. He replaced the decuria scheme with a military-like structure up to the battalion level and issued a number of rulebooks, but above all in 1933–1934 he toured the country making appointments, issuing orders, supervising buildup and delivering training himself. Though in regions like Catalonia standardization efforts encountered some resistance, the organization gained momentum also beyond Navarre. In early 1934 the party executive formed Frente Nacional de Boinas Rojas, the attempt to create a hierarchical national Requeté structure, detached from local Carlist juntas. Its political leader was appointed José-Luis Zamanillo. Some 150 militants attended military training in Fascist Italy. In late 1934 requetés for the first time ever offered their service to military commanders confronted with the October revolution. In early 1935 Requeté has already gained a convincingly military character which it had previously lacked; its strength was 20,000 men.

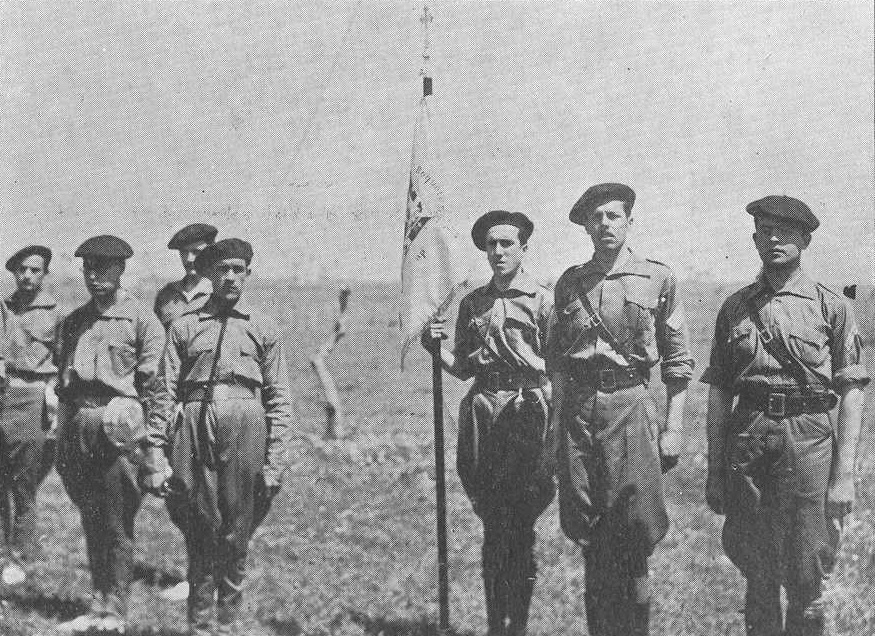
Drill of Andalusian requeté, 1934

The third phase commenced when in mid-1935 Varela handed over as Inspector General to Ricardo Rada. At the time the chief concern was weapons, with small arms being smuggled from France or procured internally; in early 1935 the organization owned 450 machine-guns. There were already plans for military action prepared, though intended as counter-revolutionary defense rather than as insurrectional coup. By late 1935 requeté sections were no longer add-ons to Carlist círculos; they became the most dynamic part of the Carlist machinery and it might have seemed that all the rest was just an add-on to Requeté. December 1935 produced first case of Requeté on alert awaiting the order to rise; another plan, this time to stage a Carlist-only rising, was developed and then abandoned in April–May 1936. In late spring of 1936 Requeté grouped 10,000 fully armed and trained men plus 20,000 forming an auxiliary pool. In contrast to urban-oriented action groups "primarily accustomed to street fighting and pistolerismo", maintained by other parties, Requeté was a "genuine citizen army" capable of performing small-scale tactical military operations.

== Civil War (1936–1939) ==
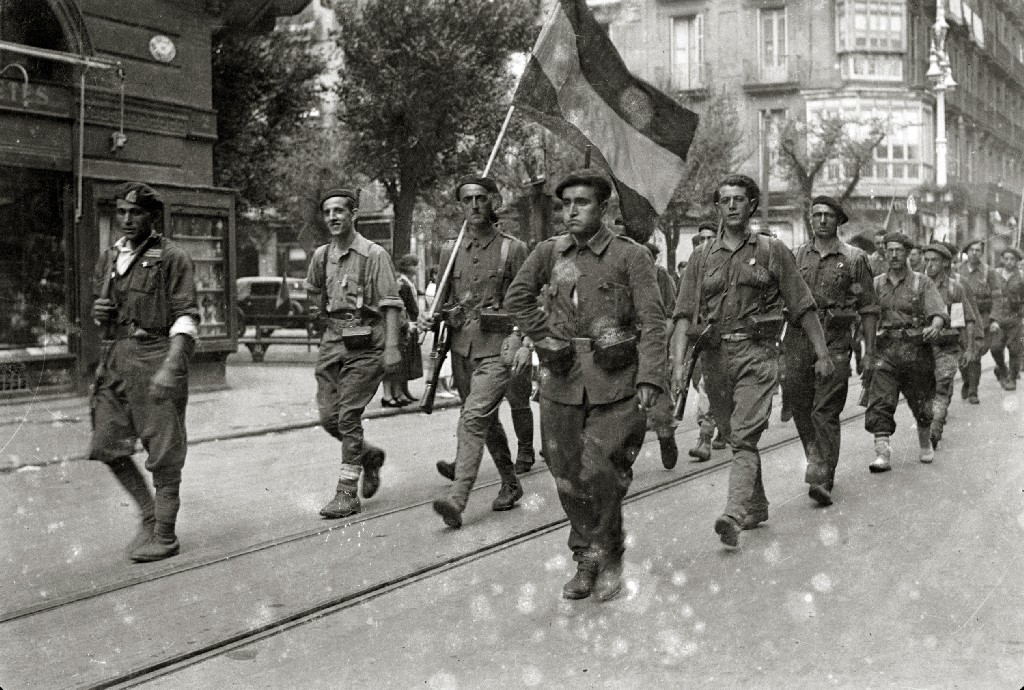
on parade, Civil War

The early period of the Civil War was the only moment when Requeté had a tangible impact on Spanish history. In 3 out of 4 regions of highest Carlist militancy, Catalonia, Levante and Vascongadas, the military coup failed and requeté rebels fell prisoners, went into hiding or fled to the Nationalist zone. However, in Navarre the organization was powerful enough to seize control over the region almost single-handedly; moreover, it contributed to the rapid capture of Western Aragón, and in the late summer of 1936 it proved crucial for Nationalist takeover of Gipuzkoa. Smaller Requeté detachments played some role during seizure of Western Andalusia. Units from Navarre, Old Castile, Leon and Galicia formed part of troops attempting to cross Sierra de Guadarrama and reach Madrid, but failed. During first weeks of the war the requeté volunteers might have formed some 15% of all Nationalist troops on the peninsula and proved vital for some of their initial strategic achievements, namely cutting off the Northern enclave from France and forming a bulwark which separated the Republican-held Vascongadas and Aragon.

Over time Requeté was losing importance as proportional component of the rebel troops. Already in October 1936 they formed only 6.5% of all Nationalist military personnel, and though later the organization maintained 20–25,000 people in its frontline units, due to overall growth of the Nationalist army the percentage kept dropping to some 3% by the end of the war. They were grouped in Carlist-only infantry battalions named tercio. There are some 40 of them known, though many were understrength and short-lived, later to be merged into other units; only about 15 operated throughout most of the war. They were typically commanded by professional army officers, possibly though not necessarily of Traditionalist leaning. The Navarrese tercios were grouped into so-called Brigades of Navarre, units composed also of army detachments and other militias; during much of the war they operated jointly as the Navarre Army Corps. Other tercios were assigned to various larger heterogeneous units. The wartime deployment of most Requeté tercios was first in the Vascongadas, then Cantabria, Asturias, the Teruel front, Maestrazgo and finally in Catalonia.

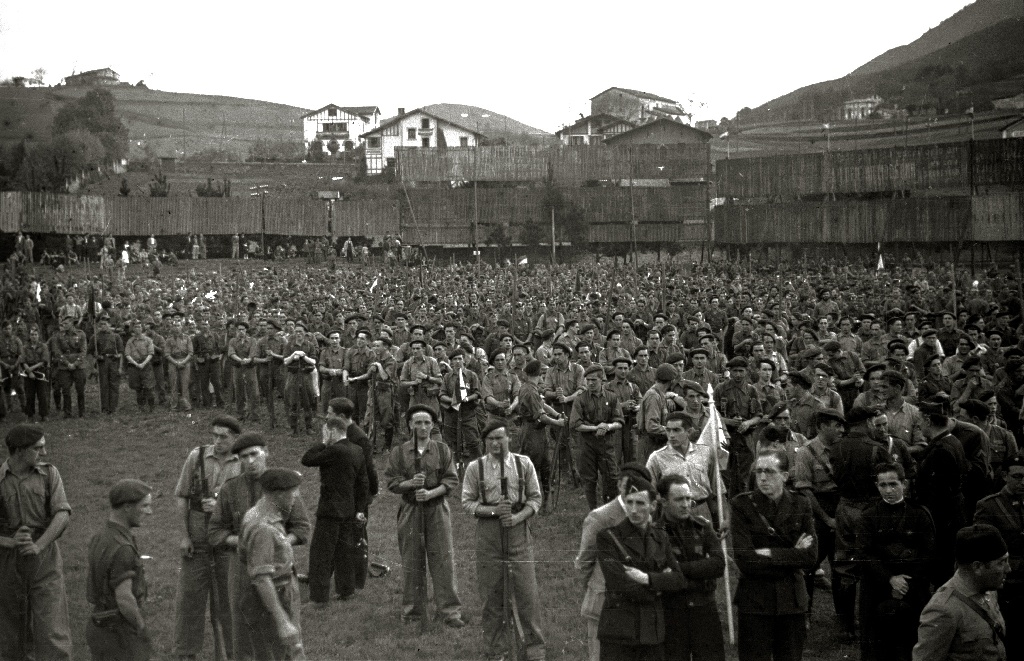
In mass, Civil War

Political unification did not affect Requeté tercios much; though formally incorporated into the army, they continued to operate as Carlist battalions. Recruitment was volunteer, ensured by party political structures in the rear. Exact social composition of the units is not clear; existing data suggests they were composed mostly of working-class militants, their share ranging between 55% and 85%. It is estimated that some 60,000 to 70,000 men served in Requeté one time or another, more than a half of them from Navarre. Cases of brothers, cousins or father-and-son pairs were by no means exceptional, and there were even few cases of 3 generations serving. Because along the Moroccan Regulares and the Foreign Legion the Requetés were usually deployed as shock troops, their casualties were above the average Nationalist losses. The number of KIAs is estimated between 4,000 and 6,000; the total number of casualties is given between 13,000 and 34,000.

== Early Francoism (1940s) ==
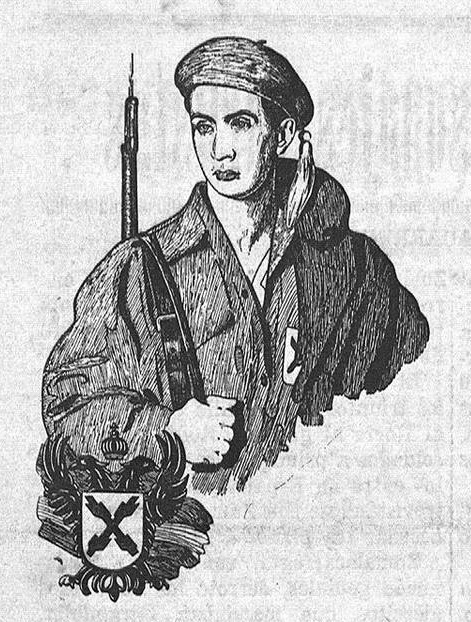
Requeté combatant: post-war propaganda image

After the war Requeté battalions were disbanded, though the organization languished as part of local Carlist structures. Theoretically Comunión Tradicionalista amalgamated within the state party, but the movement operated unofficially or on a semiclandestine basis. None of the sources consulted confirms existence of nationwide Requeté executive, though Zamanillo – who in protest against the unification resigned his position in 1937 – at some point in the early 1940s re-assumed the duties of Delegado Nacional de Requetés. At least in areas of high Carlist militancy Juntas Regionales included a Requeté delegate and in regions like Navarre or Catalonia many loose requeté cells operated locally. National party leadership tried to reorganize the network; in the ambience of disintegration and bewilderment, they were anxious to ensure Requeté loyalty to the command chain or even to turn it into the party's backbone. Some authors refer to "reconstuido Requeté". New members were being recruited, ranks were maintained and in some cases, sub-sections were developed.

Exact role of Requeté is not clear. There is no information on military training, though various groups contemplated using the structures either as recruitment pool for units supposed to fight along the Nazis or as an espionage network for the British. It seems that the cells were engaged mostly in illicit propaganda activities, like leafleting, graffiti or sale of Carlist ware. However, a Requeté bulletin was issued officially, posing as print of former soldiers. Uniformed detachments attended various gatherings, usually either religious or related to commemorations of wartime deeds. Propaganda activities often led to skirmishes with FET or security forces. Already prior to 1939 most conflicts within the state party were related to requetés refusing to abandon their identity and to embrace the official national-syndicalism. During the 1940s the Falangists and groups referred as "requetés" engaged in intimidation, fist-fights, sabotaging rallies or assaults on premises; some Carlist cells proudly reported these engagements as their key activities. The largest riots occurred in 1945 in Pamplona, when official requeté structures actively prepared the disturbances. With diminishing frequency the brawls continued until the early 1950s.

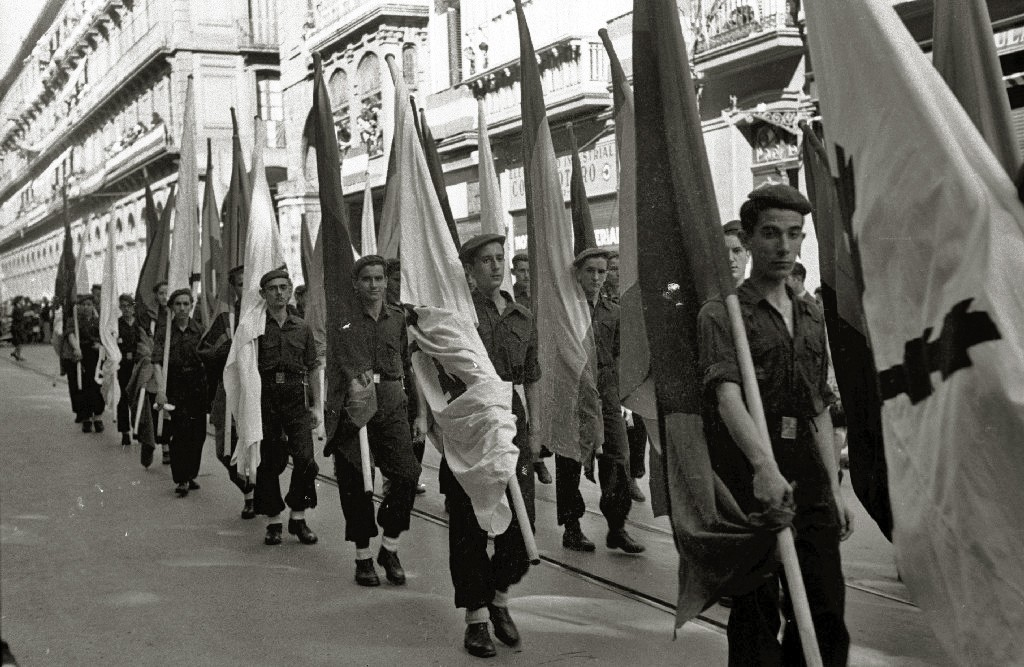
Unidentified uniformed unit with Carlist flags, San Sebastián 1942

Police kept monitoring requeté cells but there was no systematic effort to suppress them. Displaying a badge in public or having a Requeté ID card could have been a motive for detention, but presence of small uniformed groups was usually tolerated during ex-combatant or religious events. However, at times even commemorative requeté rallies were banned or officials who had permitted them were admonished; an attempt to open Museo del Requeté in Seville ended up in administrative forbiddance. Requeté members detained during street brawls were usually released after some 2 weeks in arrest, though following the Pamplona riots few leaders were kept behind bars much longer. At the turn of the 1940s and 1950s the administration condoned public appearances of a requeté-styled group which accompanied an offshoot carloctavista claimant cultivated by the regime. Over time the official policy towards Carlist organizations became more lenient and administration permitted even massive rallies.

== Mid-Francoism (1950s) ==
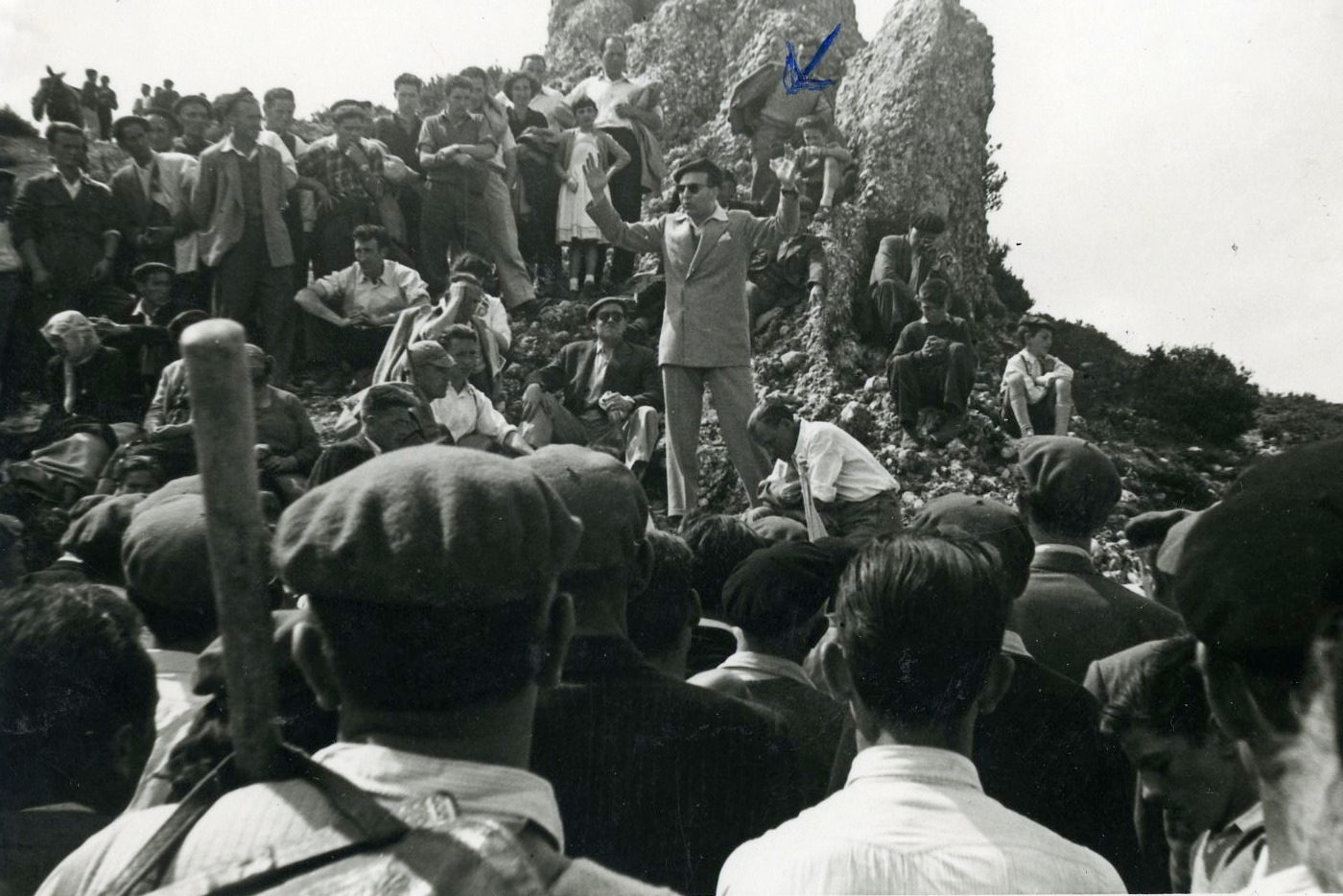
Montejurra, 1954

In the early 1950s Requeté was increasingly trapped in a generation gap. Wartime ex-combatants were approaching or in their 40s, consumed by daily routine and cultivating their Carlism as chats about wartime deeds over a glass of wine. Among young militants the centre of gravity shifted from rural or small-town ambience to large cities, and these activists tended rather towards the party academic organisation AET. To them, Requeté was more of a glorious remnant of the past, tailored to wartime needs and unsuitable as vehicle of political militancy. There are no membership numbers available, though the organization played little role in the Carlist machinery; when in the mid-1950s the party abandoned its opposition strategy and replaced it with cautious collaboration with the regime, Requeté was not involved and remained on the sidelines of the decision-making process. Zamanillo as Delegado Nacional de Requeté kept representing the organization in Secretaría Nacional and regional jefés operated locally, but it is not clear how much the network was still rooted in the ground.

Visible revitalisation of Carlism, related to the 1957 appearance of Don Carlos Hugo and his team, affected Requeté little; the focus was rather on AET. Uniformed militants were needed as part Traditionalist rallies like the Montejurra ascent and in large cities "requetés" were at times detained, e.g. for carrying placards aimed against Don Juan Carlos, however it is not clear whether in both cases the individuals in question were actually members of the Requeté organisation or rather ex-combatants and party militants. There were some signs of attempted revival, though. In 1957 Zamanillo nominated the 33-year-old Arturo Márquez de Prado y Pareja as "chief instructor" with apparent aim to resume military training. Also some sub-sections of the organization have been established; in 1958 a "Comisión Técnica Nacional del Requeté" was noted for its lengthy political analysis. Intended for the party leader José María Valiente, it recommended a firm and intransigent stand versus the Juanistas and the regime.

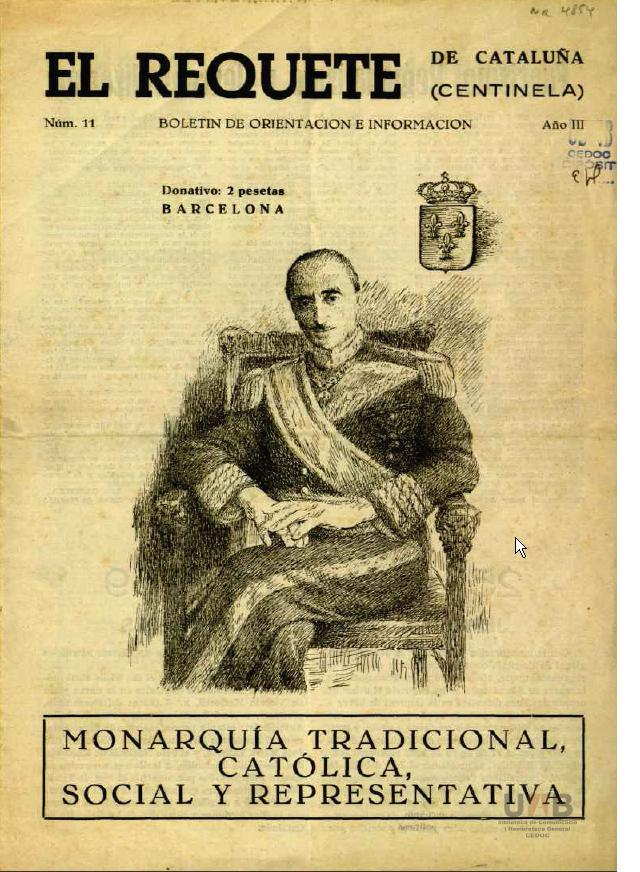
Requeté bulletin, 1959

In the late 1950s Requeté, increasingly perceived as an antiquated section of Carlist machinery, was getting more and more sidelined. Though the young Huguistas were inclined to allow it to rot, others saw the need for reorganisation. However, various proposals emerging to address the issue were at times contradictory. In 1959 the Navarrese jefé Francisco Javier Astraín complained about eternal dissent within the regional organisation, which "siempre había en la provincia para encontrar un jefe de requeté"; he suggested appointment of a new, strong-hand, military leader. On the other hand, some reports advocated exactly the opposite, namely more independence for the Requeté structures. The response from central party command was inconclusive. In 1960 latest the party executive Junta Nacional formed 7 specialized departments, and Comisión de Requeté was one of them. The same year Zamanillo, at the time Valiente's right hand, was promoted to Secretario General of the Comunión; he vacated the seat of Requete delegate, held for over 25 years. At this role he was replaced by Márquez de Prado.

== Late Francoism (1960s) ==
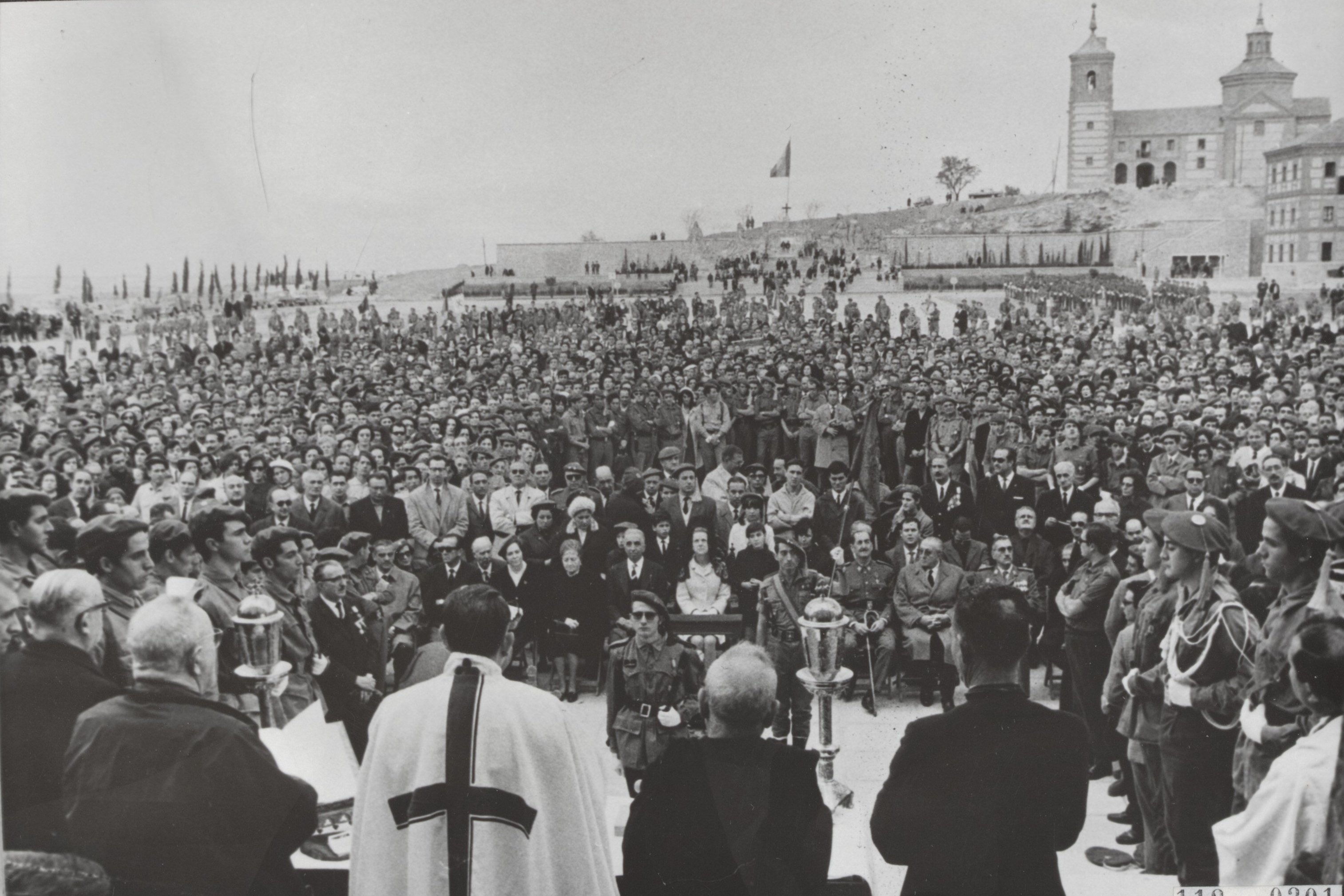
uniformed Requeté members during a rally near Madrid, 1966

Under the new command Requeté put more focus on paramilitary instruction. There were systematic training courses organized, Márquez de Prado pondered upon assistance to Cuban counter-revolutionaries and to OAS in Algeria, and a police report from 1962 claimed that the structures were "perfectly organized". Carlists in the entourage of Don Carlos Hugo were increasingly anxious about the Requeté "influencia militarista" in the Comunión. At the time the organization was for the first time ever getting engaged in political debates within the party. Márquez de Prado remained suspicious about the prince, his entourage and their new ideas, while Requeté was gradually turning into the bulwark of Traditionalist orthodoxy. Ramón Massó and other Huguista leaders concluded that Márquez de Prado, obsessed with confronting counter-revolution, had to be sidelined. As to the organisation itself they were undecided whether there was a chance to control it or whether it should be marginalized.

In 1963 one of the Huguistas, Pedro José Zabala, presented Valiente with his draft of the Requeté overhaul. The group envisioned that the organisation "debía tener una misión más social y política" and that Márquez de Prado be ousted; brother of another Huguista partisan, Juan Zavala Castella, was proposed as new delegado nacional. The same year Márquez de Prado asked Valiente for the opposite, namely consolidation of his own powers; some considered it a pre-emptive strike inspired by Zamanillo, already expulsed from the Comunión. At the time "paulatino desmantelamiento" of Requeté, apparently intended by the Huguistas, was ongoing, even though its uniformed units played ceremonial roles during key Carlist rallies. Still officially represented in Junta Nacional and Secretaría Nacional, in 1963 the Requeté budget was merely 4% of the entire Comunión spending. The pressure on Valiente mounted and eventually in early 1965 Márquez de Prado was dismissed; as Delegado Nacional de Requeté he was replaced by a 56-year-old Navarrese, Miguel de San Cristobál Ursua.

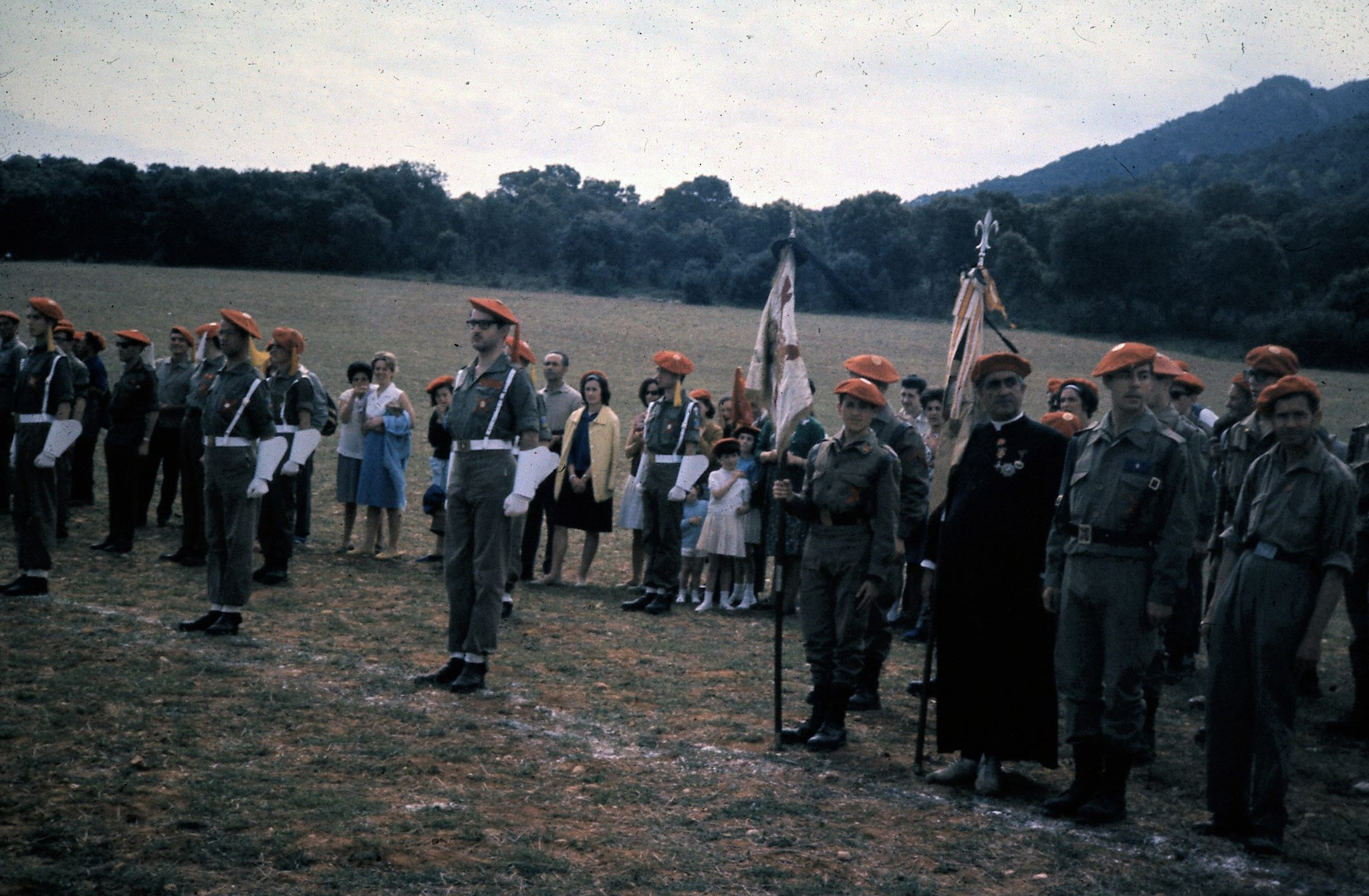
Requeté guard of honour at Montejurra, 1960s

Initial line of San Cristobál is unclear. On the one hand, he prepared decentralization and demilitarization of the organisation. On the other, some decisions suggested buildup of "grupos de acción", possibly engaged in terrorist activity; during the party congress of 1966 this was the future Requeté direction supported by most participants. However, the same year another option was chosen. Like in case of most other sections, the nationwide Requeté executive was disbanded and its local structures were subordinated to corresponding juntas, which marked reversal to the pre-1934 pattern. All the above, plus San Cristobál's address at Montejurra, triggered protests; some Juntas Provinciales accused the Huguista-dominated secretariat of manipulating Carlist structures and many militants resigned or left. An internal report of 1967 claimed that disorganization of Requeté "es total"; some historians maintain that in few years following decentralization, Requeté "practicamente desaparece". During the 1968 Montejurra there were first fist-fights recorded between requetés and members of the newly emerged GAC. However, some Traditionalists have concluded that the Huguistas had already won the battle for Requeté, which in turn enabled their control of the entire party.

== Decomposition (1970s) ==
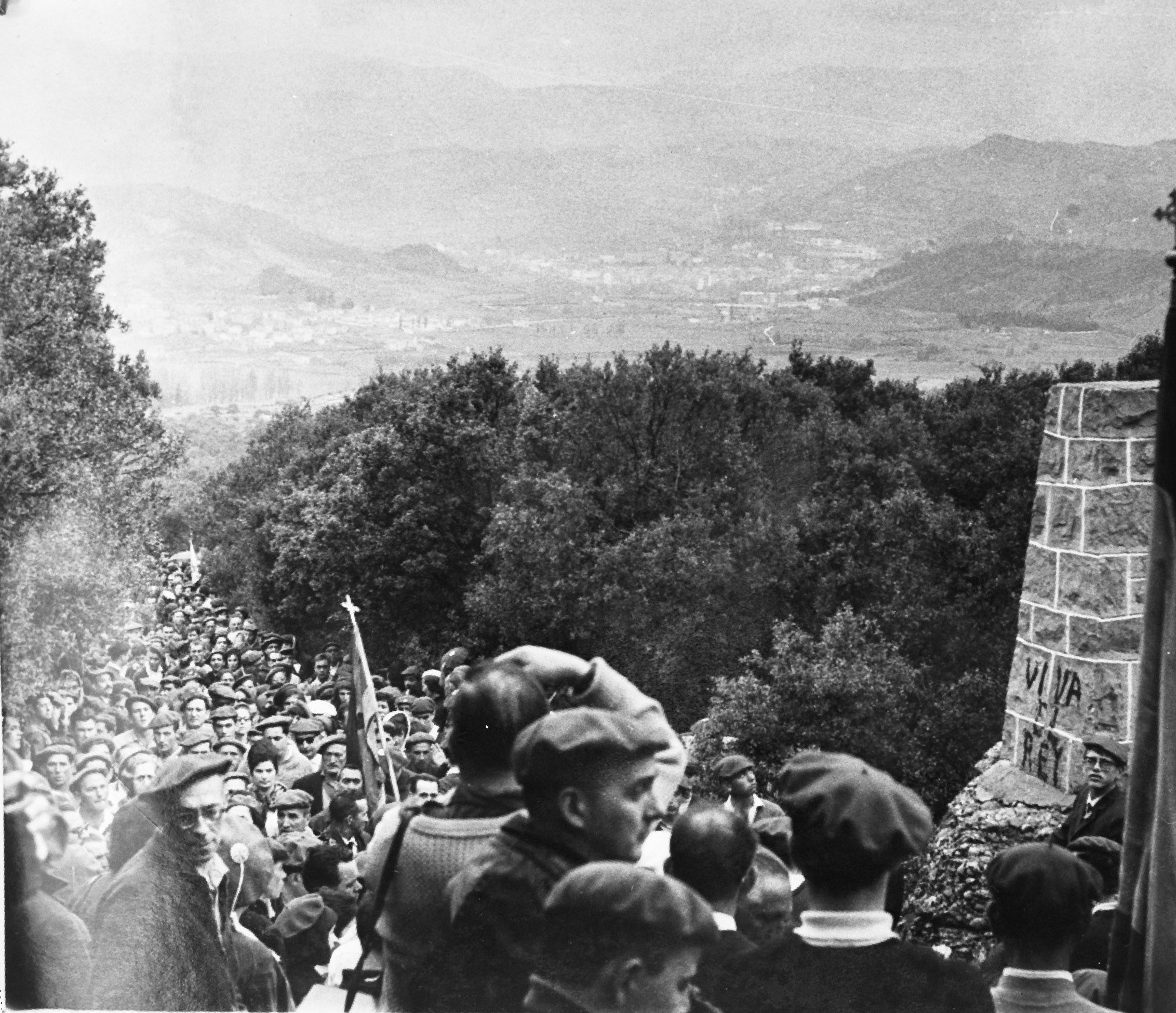
Montejurra, 1973

Since the late 1960s chief propaganda vehicles of the Huguista faction ceased referring to requeté. In the very early 1970s San Cristobál was noted in the party press as merely the Navarrese jefé regional and even regional executive bodies did not include a Requeté representative. The Traditionalist faction abandoned any attempt to regain control over the organization and focused on struggle to retain influence in the ex-combatant Requeté hermandad, since 1965 headed by another Huguista, Ignacio Romero Osborne. With assistance of state security services the bid proved successful, but the entire ex-combatant movement, always prone to fragmentation, soon decomposed into total chaos. In 1971 Romero set up a competitive organisation based in France, while various other Hermandades pursued own political paths, usually centred around late Francoist structures and Don Juan Carlos; in 1972–1973 some of them acted as intended but failed centers of revitalized, anti-Huguista Carlist movement.

In the early 1970s the Huguista-dominated Carlist movement underwent total structural transformation; the intention was to turn it into a new, mass-based party. During a series of rallies staged in 1971–1972 in the French Arbonné Comunión Tradicionalista was transformed into a totally new entity, Partido Carlista. Its structures did not envision any Requeté section. There is no document or single decision dissolving the entire organization known, but historians claim that during buildup of Partido Carlista of the early 1970s, the Requeté – at that time already almost defunct – was effectively dissolved along all other sections of the movement, like AET, MOT or the Margaritas. The role of a violent, paramilitary arm was assumed by Grupos de Acción Carlista, the section which purposely broke with the requeté tradition as reminiscent of old civil war divisions and the reactionary currents; some scholars tend to suppose that in some respects, GAC was somewhat in-between an heir to and a bastard of Requeté.

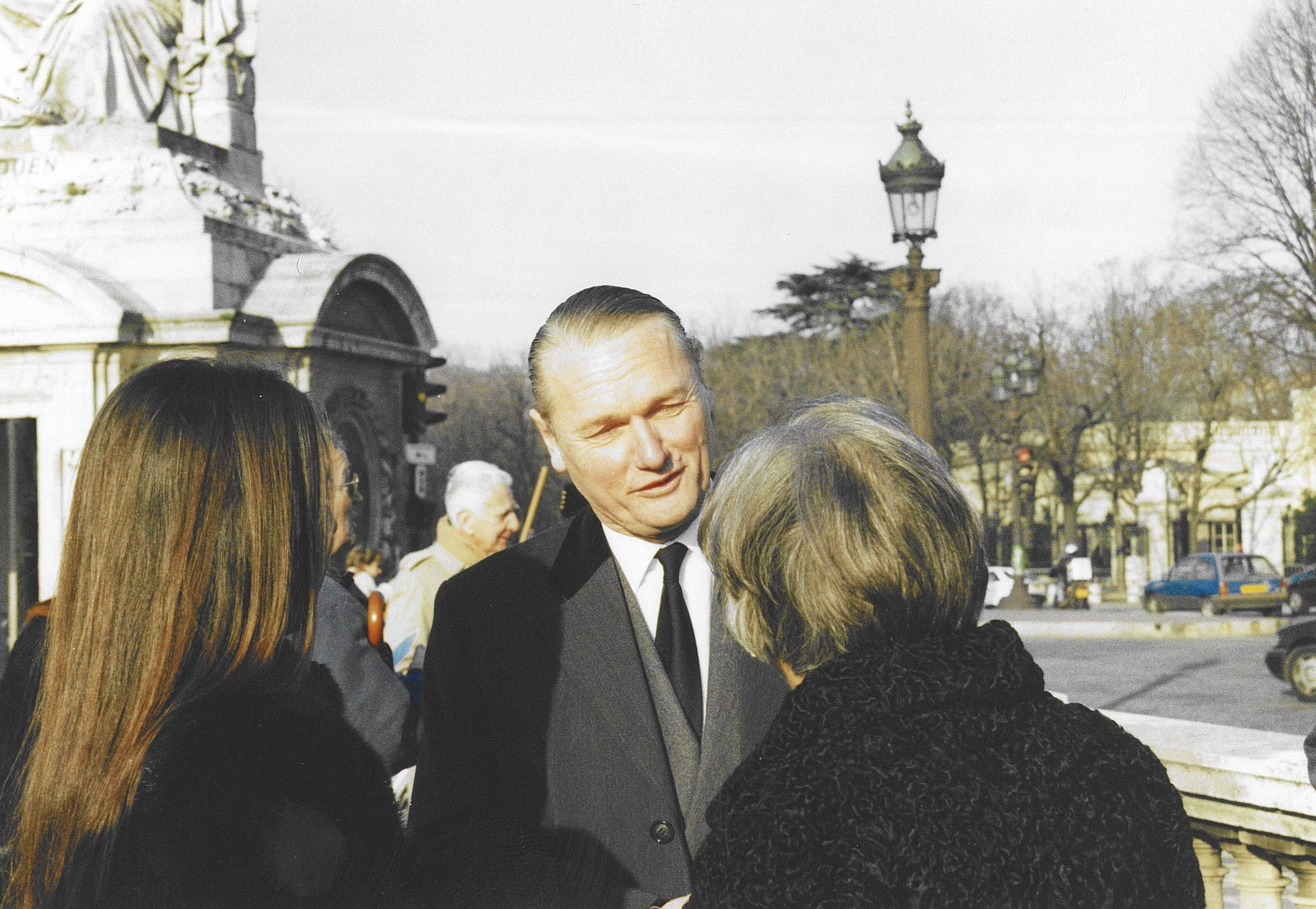
Don Sixto (later photo)

At the time the Traditionalists sought to build their own Requeté infrastructure. "La persona fundamental" in this process was Márquez de Prado, assisted by Zamanillo; at one point it seemed that even San Cristobál might get involved. Exact results of these efforts are not clear. In 1973 a body named Comisión Permanente of Junta Nacional de Jefes de Requetés, led by Márquez de Prado, issued a manifesto which declared Don Carlos Hugo traitor to the sacred cause and pledged to re-build a genuine Carlist organization; it is not clear whether there was any structure behind it or the signatories represented themselves only. Initially the group seemed leaning towards Don Juan Carlos as a dynastical leader, though they also declared some "reserva mental". Eventually, in 1975 Márquez de Prado and his followers pledged loyalty to Don Sixto. His group, named Jefatura Nacional de Requetés, kept issuing manifestos also in 1976 and it might have been involved in the Montejurra shooting of the same year. In 1977 de Prado was nominated Jefe Nacional de Requetés by the emergent Comunión Tradicionalista. However, there is hardly any trace of organized Requeté network existent in the late 1970s. The ETA campaign of assassinations against Carlists produced no emergence of any retaliatory structures.

== Recent times (1980s and afterwards) ==
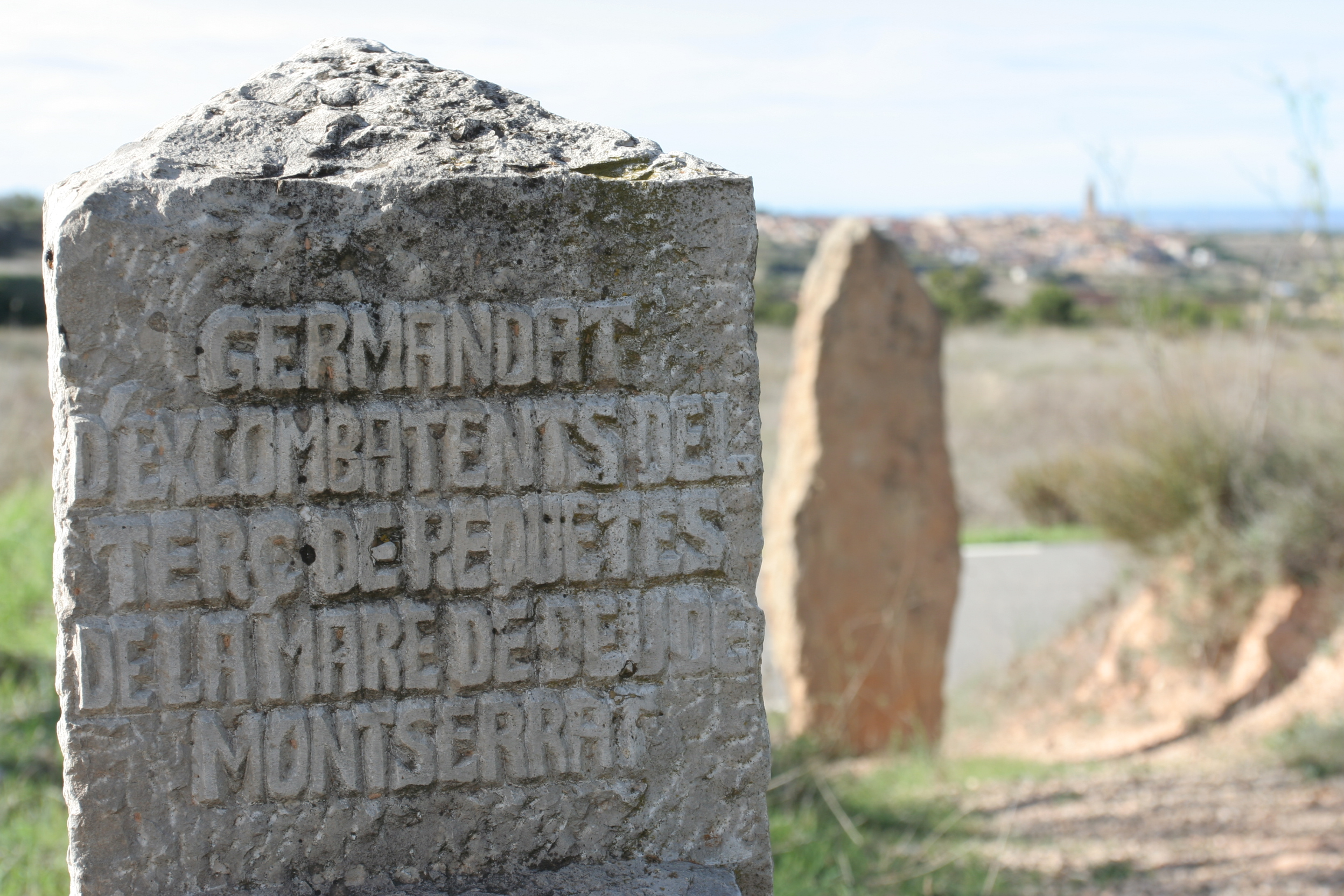
Stone erected by ex-combatant requeté organisation, Catalonia

In the 1980s all Carlist structures underwent a period of confusion, chaos and convulsive transformations; however, none of numerous organizations or bodies claiming to have represented the Carlist or Traditionalist line maintained a section posing as straightforward or indirect continuation of Requeté. GAC, never officially endorsed by Partido Carlista as part of its structures, ceased to operate. Asociación Juvenil Tradicionalista, a feeble and shadowy structure associated with Don Sixto which emerged in the late 1970s, its members appearing on right-wing feasts in khaki uniforms and red berets, went out of sight as well. The name of "requeté" appeared most often in relation to various ex-combatant organisations, either engaged in post-Francoist rallies – e.g. on anniversary of dictator's death in 1981 – or in commemorative feasts related to milestones of Carlist history, e.g. in 1984 in Seville.

In the late 20th century the only organizations associated with the Requeté tradition identified as operational were various hermandades of former soldiers in the civil war tercios. Due to changing political climate and anti-Francoist shift in public opinion, their activity was decreasingly public and increasingly formatted as private, small-circle meetings, even in Navarre. Some went on as legal owners of sanctuaries built during Francoism and issued publications on history of their units, though fairly frequent death notices, published in the press and referring to just deceased "requeté hasta su muerte" or "requeté voluntario de la Cruzada", demonstrated that the ranks of combatants were getting increasingly thin. The death notices are still being published today, though now usually referring to "the last living combatant" from specific region, battalion, or even at all.

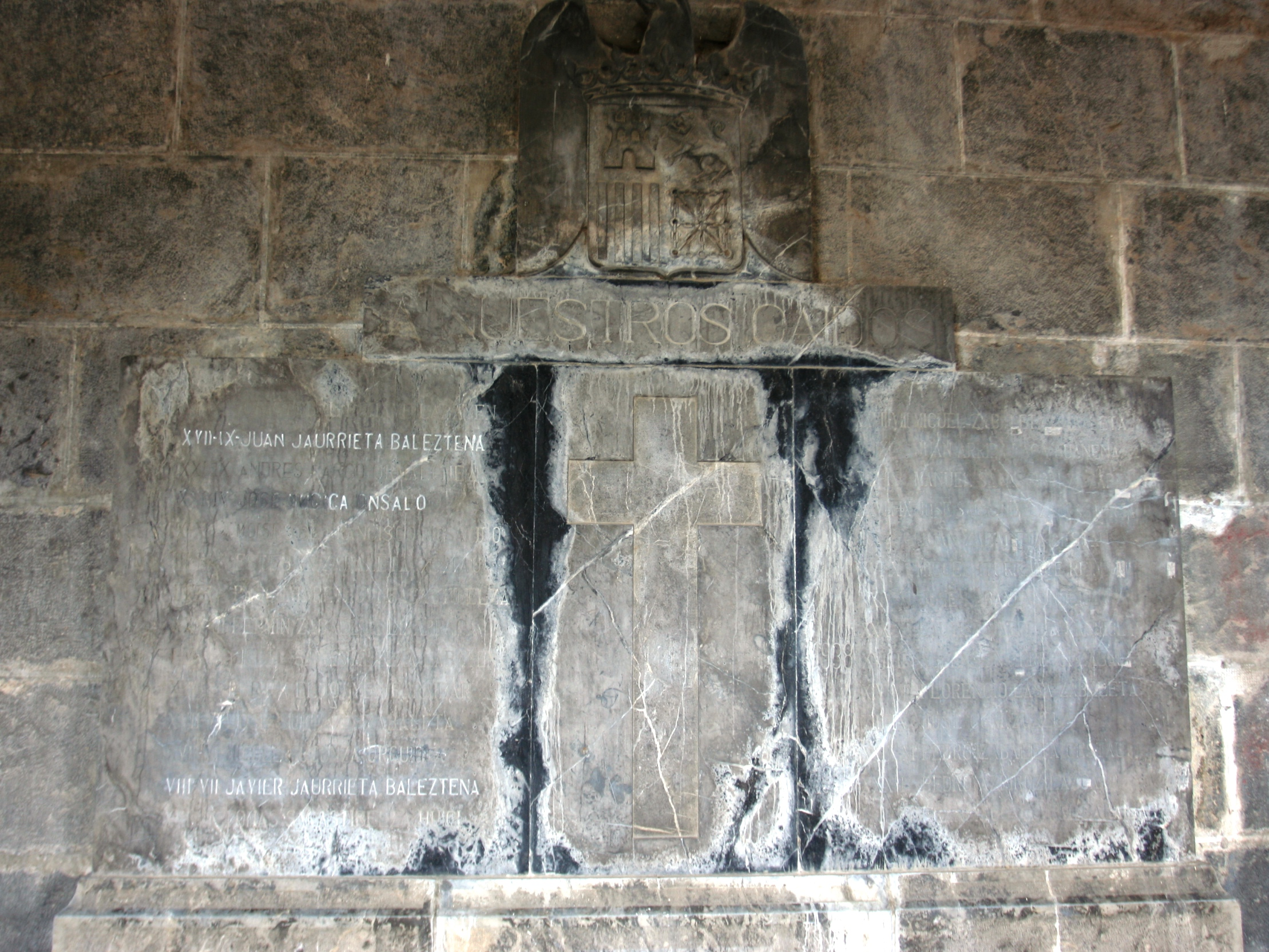
Repeatedly vandalized stones with names of fallen requetés, Navarre

Arrival of the digital era and the social media has produced a resurgence of individuals or groups posing as "Requeté". A few profiles on platforms like Instagram, Twitter, Facebook or YouTube demonstrate some sort of self-proclaimed adhesion to the requeté tradition. Some go somewhat further and form informal "Friends of Requeté" groups, re-enactment teams, Requeté associations of "mujeres y hombres defensores del tradicional cuatrilema de Dios, Patria, Fueros, y Rey Legítimo", or adopt a posture of a military-like, uniformed "New Requeté" organization; most though not all of these profiles are either inactive or hardly active. Some keep publishing notes styled as official communiqués and signed either by "Comandante General del Requeté" or by "Jefatura Nacional del Requeté", e.g. in 2016 or 2020. Individuals who sign these notes assume a military tone, appear to be aligned with the claimant Don Carlos Javier, lecture competitive Traditionalist groupings on rights to use the Requeté symbols or uniforms and imply that the organization is still operational. Persons related to the profile appear at Montejurra ascents organized by Partido Carlista, where indeed some participants, including females, don a military-like gear.

== Appendix. Major Civil War battles ==
Major Civil War Requeté battles:

Location	Part of	Date	Battalions engaged	Assignement	Strength	Total Losses	Killed	Result
Approaches to Irún	Gipuzkoa Campaign	1936/8-9	S.Fermín, Lácar, S.Miguel, Montejurra, Navarra	Offensive	2,500	500	100	Success
Deva Line	Gipuzkoa Campaign	1936/10	N.S.d.Camino, S.Fermín, Lácar, Navarra	Offensive	2,000	300	50	Failure
Approaches to Bilbao	Biscay Campaign	1937/4-6	N.S.d.Camino, S.Ignacio, Lácar, Montejurra, S.Miguel, Navarra, Oriamendi, Zumalacárregui	Offensive	4,000	1,200	300	Success
Central Aragon	Battle of Aragon	1937/8	Almogávares, M.d.Molina, Montserrat, M.d.l.Nieves	Defensive	1,200	800	550	Failure
Sierra de Mazuco	Asturias Campaign	1937/9-10	S. Fermín, Lácar, Montejurra, Navarra, Roncesvalles-Mola, Zumalácarregui	Offensive	2,500	500	150	Success
La Muela de Teruel	Battle of Teruel	1938/1-2	N.S.d.Begoña, N.S.d.Camino, Lácar, Montejurra, Navarra, Oriamendi, V.Blanca	Defensive	4,500	1,000	200	Success
Milano	Maestrazgo Campaign	1938/5	N.S.d.Begoña, N.S.d.Camino, Lácar, Montejurra	Offensive	2,000	200	50	Success
Sierra de Espadán	Maestrazgo Campaign	1938/7-8	N.S.d.Begoña, N.S.d.Camino, Lácar, S.Miguel, Castellano-Mola, Montejurra, M.d.l.Nieves	Offensive	4,000	500	100	Failure
Sierra de Pàndols/Caballs	Battle of Ebro	1938/9-11	Alcazar, Burgos-Sangüesa, Cristo Rey, Lácar, Montejurra, N.S.d.Pilar	Offensive	4,000	1,300	200	Success
Catalonia	Catalonia Offensive	1939/1-3	Castellano-Mola, Lácar, Montejurra, S.Miguel, Oriamendi, Ortiz d.Zárate, N.S.d.Pilar, V.Blanca	Offensive	5,500	400	100	Success

Other notable Civil War Requeté engagements:

Year	Location (month; units engaged)
1936	Cuelgamuros (July; Abarzuza); Braojos (September–October; d. Rey, Estibaliz); Isusquiza (October; Virgen Blanca, 8. Alava); Villareal de Alava (November–December; Virgen Blanca)
1937	Lopera (January; S. Rafael); Matillas (January; Burgos-Sanguesa); Jarama (February; Alcazar); Marquína (April; Lácar); Monte Saibigain (April–May; S. Miguel, Oriamendi); Brunete (July; S. Miguel); Fuentes del Tajo (July; M.d.Molina); Andújar-Arjona (December; Virgén d.l. Reyes)
1938	Caspe (March; Lácar); Esquedas (March; Ortiz d. Zarate); Mano de Hierro (March; Virgén d.l. Reyes); Puente de Montañana (April; Ortiz d. Zarate); Peñas de Aholo (May; Oriamendi); Merida Pocket (July, Montserrat); Vilalba de los Arcos (August; Montserrat)
1939	Valsequillo (January; Montserrat)

== See also ==
- Carlism
- Traditionalism (Spain)
