= Ignacio Romero Osborne =

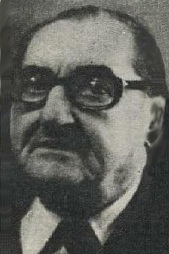
- Born: 1903; Seville, Spain
- Died: 1985 (aged 81–82); Seville, Spain
- Occupation: landowner
- Known for: ex-combatant leader
- Political party: Carlism

Ignacio Romero Osborne, 5th Marquess of Marchelina (1903–1985) was a Spanish aristocrat, landowner, officer and Carlist politician. In the 1930s he conspired against the Republic and co-engineered the 1936 coup in Seville; during the Civil War he commanded company-type units in Nationalist ranks. He is best known as leader of the Requeté ex-combatant organisation, active in particular in the late 1960s. During internal struggle within Carlism he sided with the progressist faction against the traditionalist one and helped to tip the balance in favor of Prince Carlos Hugo. In 1968-1971 he was member of the Carlist executive, Junta Suprema; afterwards he presided over the provincial Seville branch of Partido Carlista. In the 1970s he conspired against the Franco regime and supported the radical left-wing socialist line of PC.

== Family and youth ==
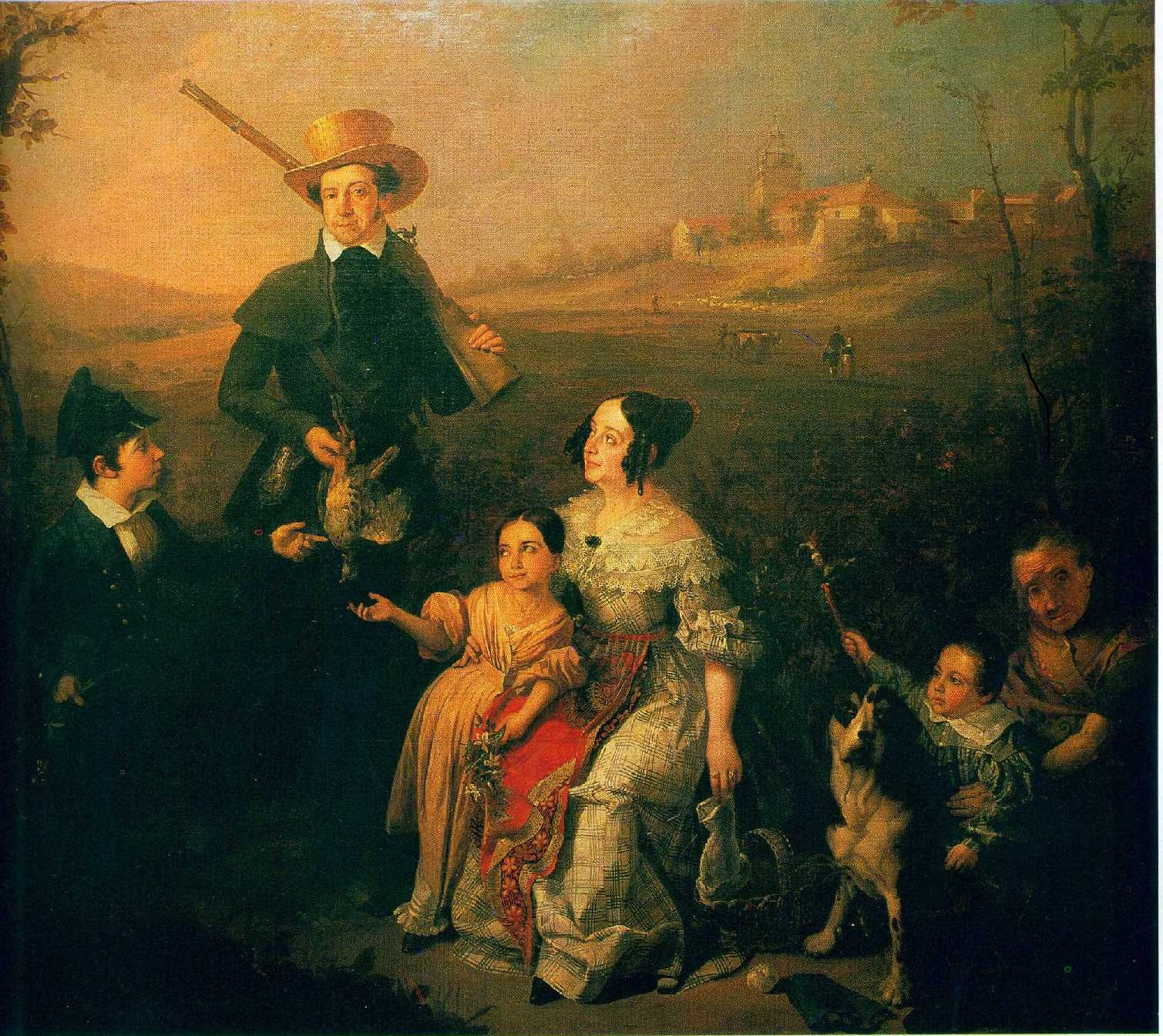
paternal grandmother (as a child) and de Arco great-grandparents

Romero descended from aristocratic Andalusian landholder families. The paternal line was traditionally related to military; his great-grandfather Ignacio Romero Cepeda owned large estates near Osuna, held high posts in Spanish possessions in America, was made Marqués de Marchelina in 1858 and served in the Senate in the early 1860s. His son and Romero grandfather Alejandro Romero Cepeda (1832–1895) married the later Marquesa del Arco Hermoso. Their son and Romero's father, Ignacio Romero Ruíz de Arco (1858–1915), inherited both marquess titles. He was also a military, serving on various assignments across Andalusia; before his premature death he ascended to teniente coronel. In 1898 he married Enriqueta Osborne Guezala (1862-after 1935) from the well-known winegrowing Osborne family. She was granddaughter to the founder of the branch Thomas Osborne Mann and daughter to Tomás Osborne Böhl de Faber, the man who turned the business into the Andalusian wine powerhouse; it was her brother who later launched the iconic Osborne bull symbol.

The couple shuttled between their house in Seville and rural estates in the provinces of Seville and Cádiz. They had 5 children, two of them boys; Ignacio was born as the fourth child and the first son. Their father decided to split the aristocratic titles; Marquesado de Marchelina went to Ignacio, while Marquesado del Arco Hermoso went to Alejandro. Both boys assumed their titles upon death of their parent. It is not clear where Ignacio received his early education; both brothers decided to follow in the footsteps of their father and commence a military career. As an adolescent boy in 1919 Ignacio was admitted as aspirante aprobado to Academia de Infantería in Toledo, but in 1921 he moved to Academia de Artillería in Segovia. In 1924 Romero was promoted to alferéz alumno; he graduated as teniente in 1927. His first service assignment, also in 1927, was to Tenerife.

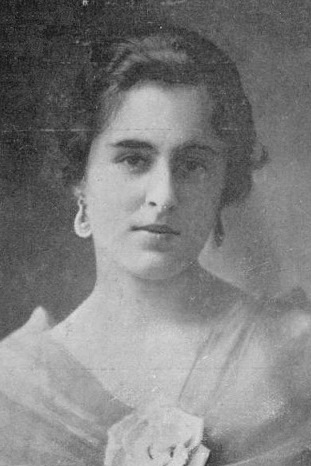
sister Enriqueta

In 1934 Romero married Micaela de Solís-Beaumont y Lasso de la Vega (1913–1969) from Seville. She descended from a landholder family from Carmona; though her parents did not hold aristocratic titles, they were related to numerous well-born families, like these of Marqués de Tablantes (Solís) and Marqués de Torres de la Pressa (Lasso de Vega). Ignacio and Micaela settled in Seville and had 14 children, born between the mid-1930s and the early 1950s. None of them became a widely recognized public figure. The best known one is Romero's oldest son, Ignacio Romero Solís. One of communist Seville leaders in the 1960s, he spent a year behind bars; in the 1980s and 1990s, he headed the Andalusian branch of RTVE. In 2015-2020 he published an epic novel trilogy focused on the disappearance of the world of old Andalusian aristocracy. Holder of the marquesado, Romero Solís later ceded it to his grandson, the current marqués. Romero Osborne's grandson briefly gained attention of gossip media when, in 2012, he married the daughter to the then minister of defense. Romero's siblings married mostly into well-established Andalusian families; e.g., his sister Enriqueta married the Conde de San Clemente.

== Army, conspiracy and war ==
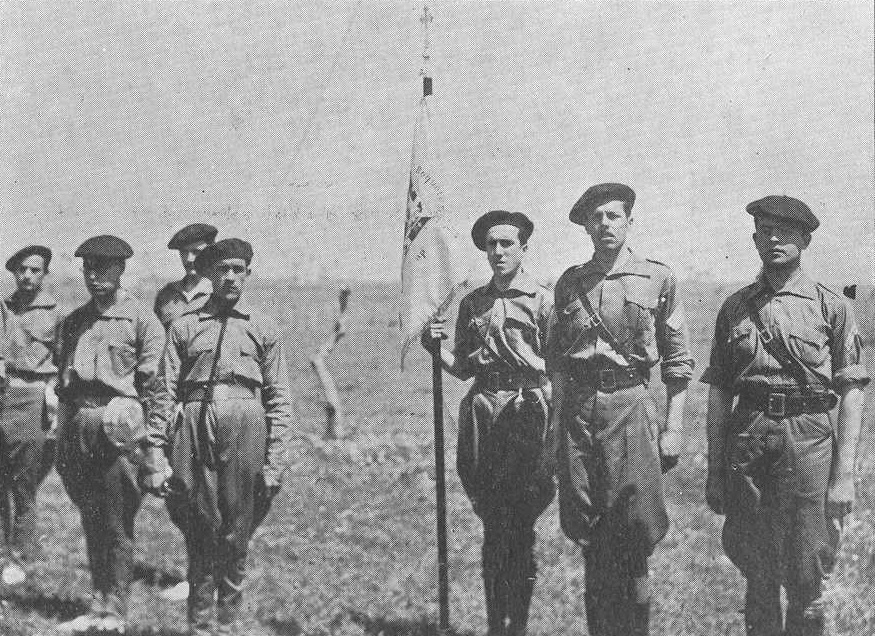
drill of Andalusian requeté, 1934

In 1929 Romero was reassigned from the Canary Islands back to the peninsula and posted to Regimiento de Artillería de Costa in Cádiz. Either in 1930 or in early 1931 he was transferred to Madrid, where as a teniente he served at an unspecified position in Fábrica Nacional de Productos Químicos, an army establishment engaged also in the development of chemical weapons. None of the sources consulted provides information on Romero's fate during early years of the Republic. The government of Manuel Azaña embarked on major reform of the army. One of its objectives was to scale down what was perceived as an overgrown officer corps; the government deployed a scheme, partially forcing and partially encouraging officers to retire. It is not clear what mechanism worked for Romero; at least since late 1933 he remained beyond active service and was noted in the press as "teniente retirado".

In terms of political preferences, the Romero family has been traditionally related to conservatism, the great-grandfather and paternal uncle serving as senators, respectively, in the 1860s and 1910s. None of the sources consulted provide any information on early political engagements of Ignacio, though as member of Maestranza de Sevilla he was linked to mainstream right-wing monarchism. However, at some point in the early 1930s Romero started to approach the Carlists and by late 1932 he was already a recognized figure in the Seville Traditionalist circles. In early 1933 the Andalusian party leader Manuel Fal Conde nominated him vice-president of Centro Tradicionalista de Sevilla and treasurer – i.e. the third in line of command - of the Seville Junta Provincial. Following wedding Romero left Spain for a long honeymoon trip abroad, but later resumed party activities and acted among leaders of the Seville requeté organisation. He was heavily involved in preparations to the 1936 coup. It is known he was particularly active procuring and smuggling arms, possibly at significant personal financial cost.

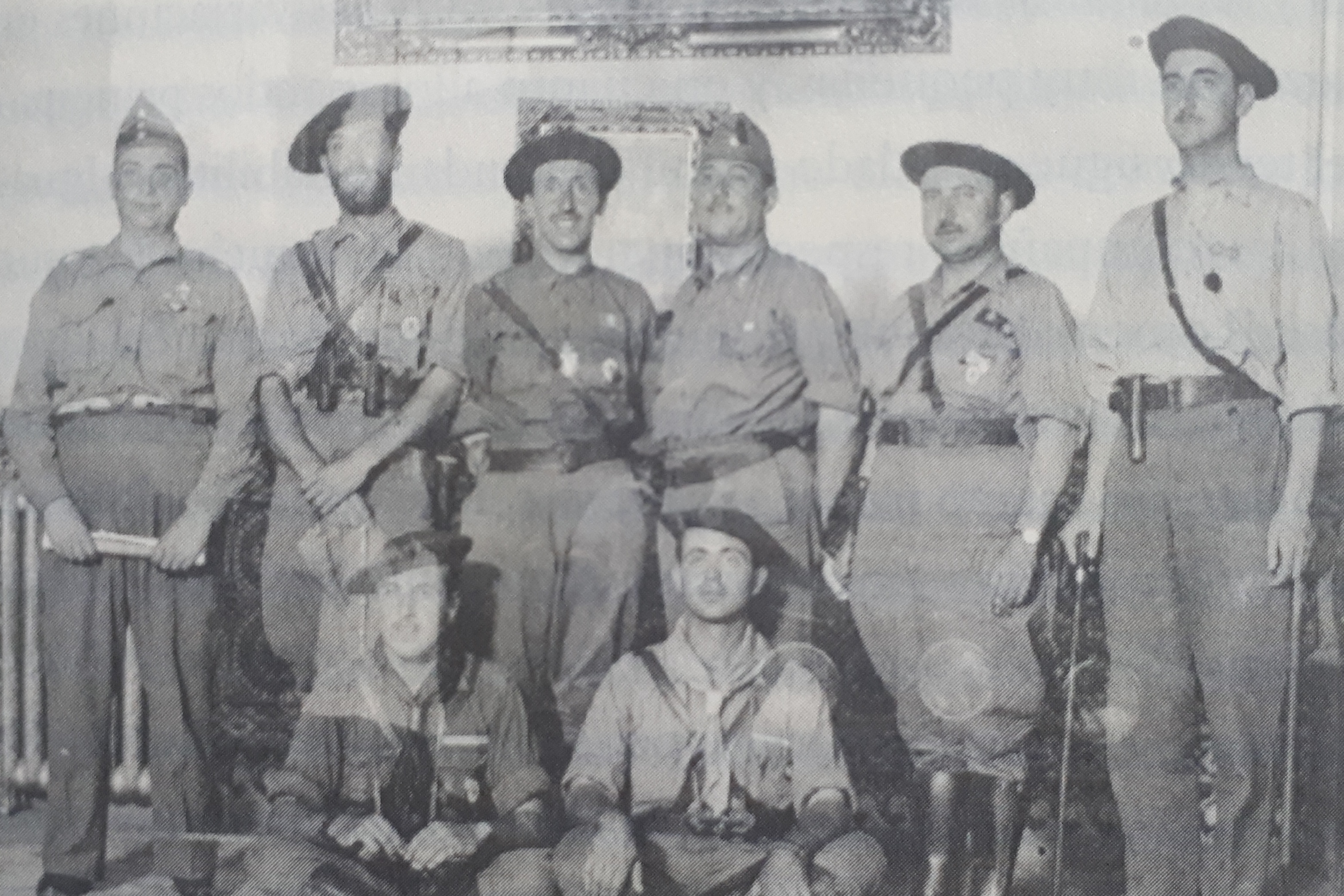
Civil war, requeté command group from Andalusia; Romero 1fR

In the evening of July 18, 1936 Romero took part in requeté assault on the Gobierno Civil premises in Seville, which contributed to swift seizure of the city center. Later in the month he took command of a requeté column operating east of Seville, which seized Puente Genil and neighboring locations. He led the column during combat also in August and September, repulsing attack of Republican militias in defense of Campillos. Following re-organization of Carlist troops he assumed command of machine-gun company, in the first half of 1937 deployed in the Jaén province; he was one of few professional officers in so-called Tercio Virgen de los Reyes. In October he was promoted to major and assumed command of Tercer Batallón de Requetés del Sur. In November 1937 the unit was moved to the Peñarroya sector. In late March 1938, during fierce combat for a position named Mano de Hierro, Romero was heavily wounded by exploding shrapnel; he escaped death but had his leg amputated.

== Withdrawal into privacy ==
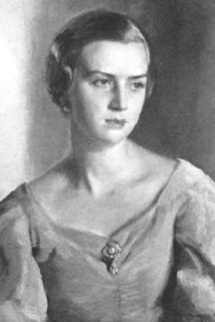
wife (earlier photo)

In late March 1938 Romero was nominated to Comisión Gestora del Ayuntamiento de Sevilla, the body which consisted of members appointed by the administration and which served as temporary replacement for the normally elected city council. It is not clear whether the nomination preceded or followed his withdrawal from combat; it is neither clear whether he assumed the duties, as until at least September 1938 he was still recovering from his wounds. At unknown time he was promoted to sub-colonel and nominated “coronel jefe de los Servicios de Intendencia”; after the war at this role and as “cabellero mutilado” he appeared seated in places of honor during public rallies, at one opportunity almost next to Franco. However, in the early 1940s he entirely disappeared from officialdom; the reasons are not clear. One highly sympathetic source would claim 40 years later that he protested executions of his former military colleagues who sided with the Republicans. Reportedly he also demanded that incarcerated ex-Republican officers like Urbano Orad de la Torre not be held in atrocious, barbaric prison conditions. This stance purportedly gained him the enmity of the Francoist administration and got him stalled on the military ascension ladder. It is not clear when Romero was released from active service and passed to reserve.

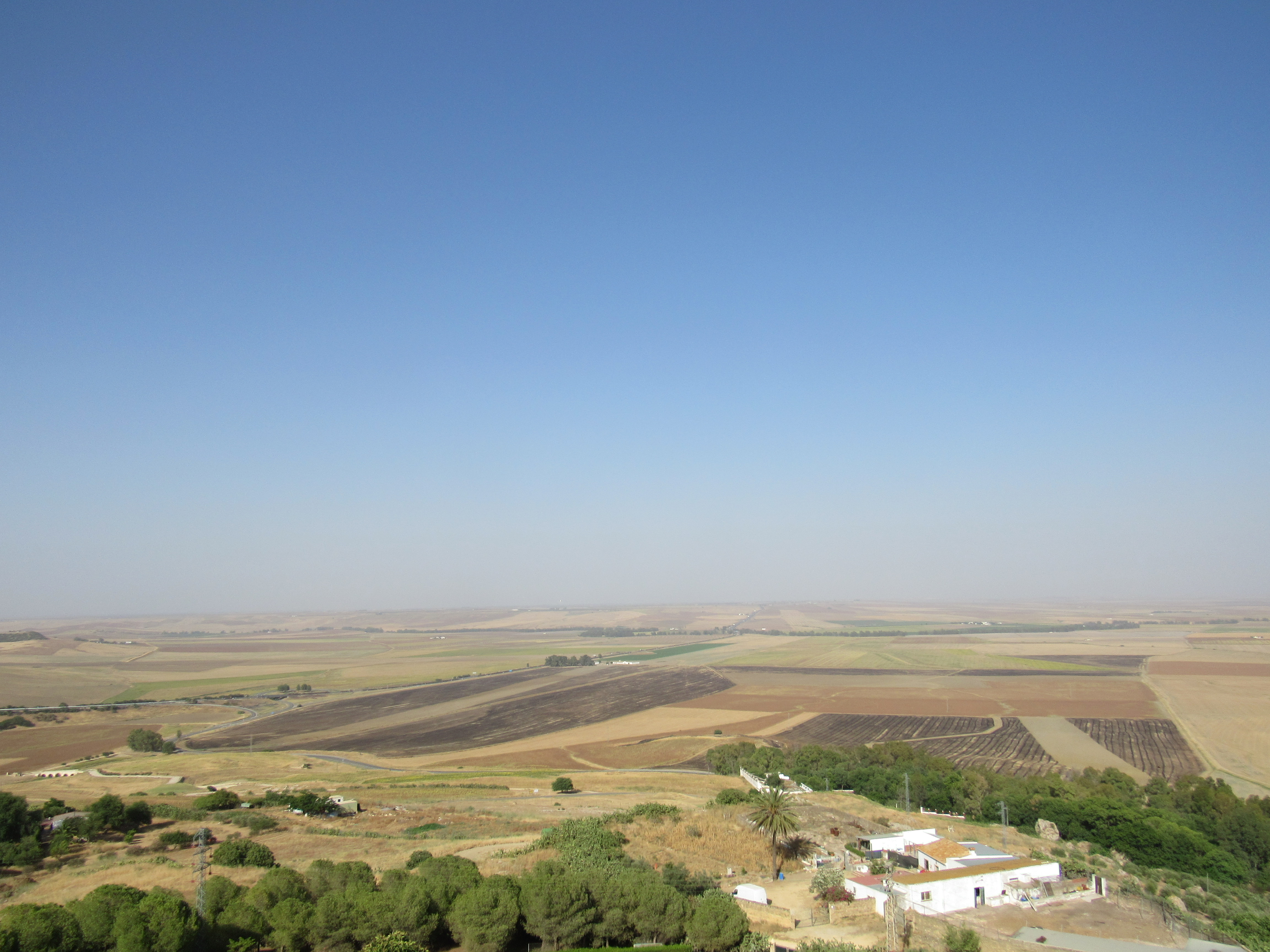
rural landscape near Carmona, southern Spain

In the 1940s, Romero completely disappeared from the public eye. He withdrew also from Carlist engagements, except one unclear case, historiographic works dwelling on the history of the movement during the so-called primer franquismo do not mention him as engaged in either the mainstream Javierista current or in any of the splinter factions, be it the Rodeznistas or the Carloctavistas. Romero withdrew to privacy, focused on family and his rural economy. The Romeros shuttled between Seville and their countryside real estate. In 1950 he claimed the vacant marquesado de Dos Hermanas, but to no avail. Later on during the decade he was noted as a landholder from Carmona, related to the property inherited by his wife. He cultivated olives and operated an own oil-mill, integrated within structures of the oil and vinegar holding, Compañía Internacional de Maquinaria Aceitera. Following a period of total absence in the press, in the early 1950s Romero re-appeared in local Andalusian titles, though on societé column only. He was mentioned either as member of Real Maestranza de Sevilla when attending related events or during family gatherings, especially that in the late 1950s his older children were already getting married and wedding ceremonies turned into aristocratic Andalusian congregations. Despite his Carlist record, on these occasions he was noted in Sevillan edition of the chief Alfonsist daily, ABC.

== Renewed Carlist engagements ==
Carlist standard

Romero resumed his public engagements in 1962. He entered the executive of newly created Hermandad de Antiguos Combatientes de Tercios de Requetés, a Carlist ex-combatant organization officially affiliated with the appropriate delegación of the Movimiento Nacional. The same year he was promoted to full colonel; it is not clear whether both events were related. During the following years Romero started to assume ceremonial roles within mainstream Carlism; in 1964 he accompanied princess Irene to Valle de los Caídos and in 1965 he organized and led a large and highly publicized pilgrimage to Santiago de Compostela. Once the hitherto president of Hermandad, José Luis Zamanillo, was first outmaneuvered and then expelled, in 1965 Romero became the new president of the organisation.

As president of Hermandad Romero enjoyed little decision-making capacity within Carlism, though he was viewed as a prestigious personality in the movement's top strata. As such, he was bombarded with alarmist notes from the rank-and-file and local structures; they complained about alleged left-wing turn and betrayal of orthodox Carlist principles. However, he took no action; instead he sided with Prince Carlos Hugo, the chief promoter of the new course. Banking on his status of mutilated combatant and president of ex-combatant organization, in 1967 Romero addressed Franco requesting Spanish citizenship for the Borbón-Parmas; in 1968 Hermandad issued another letter which denounced expected elevation of Don Juan Carlos to future royal status as betrayal to “the spirit of July 18” and pledged never to recognize it.

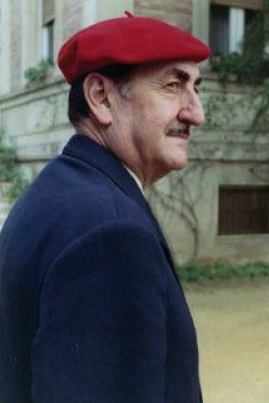
Romero, 1960s

In 1968, Carlo-Huguistas removed José María Valiente from the position of Jefe Delegado and replaced him with a collegial executive, Junta Suprema; Romero was nominated as one of its members. However, he had no real power within the organization; the progressives needed a mutilated ex-combatant as a front man to enhance their credentials. Nevertheless, he had no problem going along and kept endorsing carlo-huguistas in their internal fight against the already marginalized Traditionalists. The latter prepared a counter-strike; assisted by Francoist administration, in 1971 the orthodoxes mounted an internal coup within Hermandad and declared Romero deposed. He lost control over the organization and since then the group, which kept recognizing Romero, has been meeting in France.

In 1971 Junta Suprema was dissolved. Romero was nominated jefe of Partido Carlista in the Seville province and the claimant hailed him as “el lealísimo marqués de Marchelina”. In the early 1970s he advanced socialist propaganda styled as renovated Carlism and represented PC in anti-regime groupings. In 1974 he appeared as defense witness during trial of GAC terrorists but he condemned violence after the 1976 Montejurra shooting. The same year he declared that Partido Carlista “remains fully aligned with socialism” and advocated co-operation within Coordinación Democrática. He was stripped of Cruz de San Hermenegildo, result of his call to free political prisoners. In 1977 he was supposed to run for senate on the list of Partido Proverista, but eventually he withdrew. He last gained attention during an embrace with an ex-Republican combatant, widely reported as a symbolic act of national reconciliation.

== See also ==
- Carlism
- Carlist Party (1970)
- Traditionalism (Spain)

== Footnotes ==
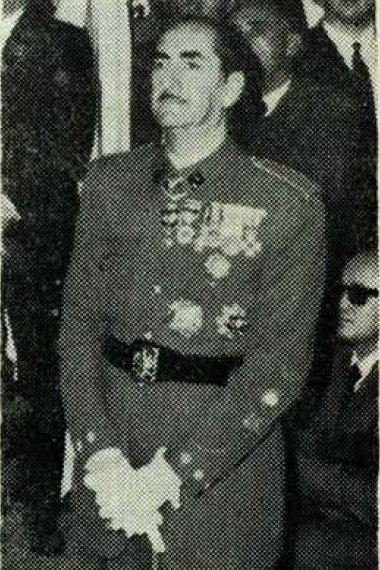
Romero as mutilated combatant, 1950s
