= Chozas =

Chozas means huts in Spanish and may refer to

Surname

- Eduardo Chozas (born 1960), Spanish road racing cyclist
- Patricia Chozas y Chozas (born 1974), Mexican politician

Municipalities in Spain

- Calera y Chozas
- Chozas de Abajo
- Chozas de Canales
  - CD Chozas de Canales, a defunct football team based in Chozas de Canales

Other

- Choza Formation, a geologic formation in Texas, U.S.
