= Terç de Requetès de la Mare de Déu de Montserrat =

Battalion-type Carlist infantry unit

- Active: September 1936 – 26 October 1939
- Country: Spain
- Type: Infantry
- Role: Shock troops
- Part of: Requeté
- Patron: Virgin of Montserrat
- Engagements: Spanish Civil War

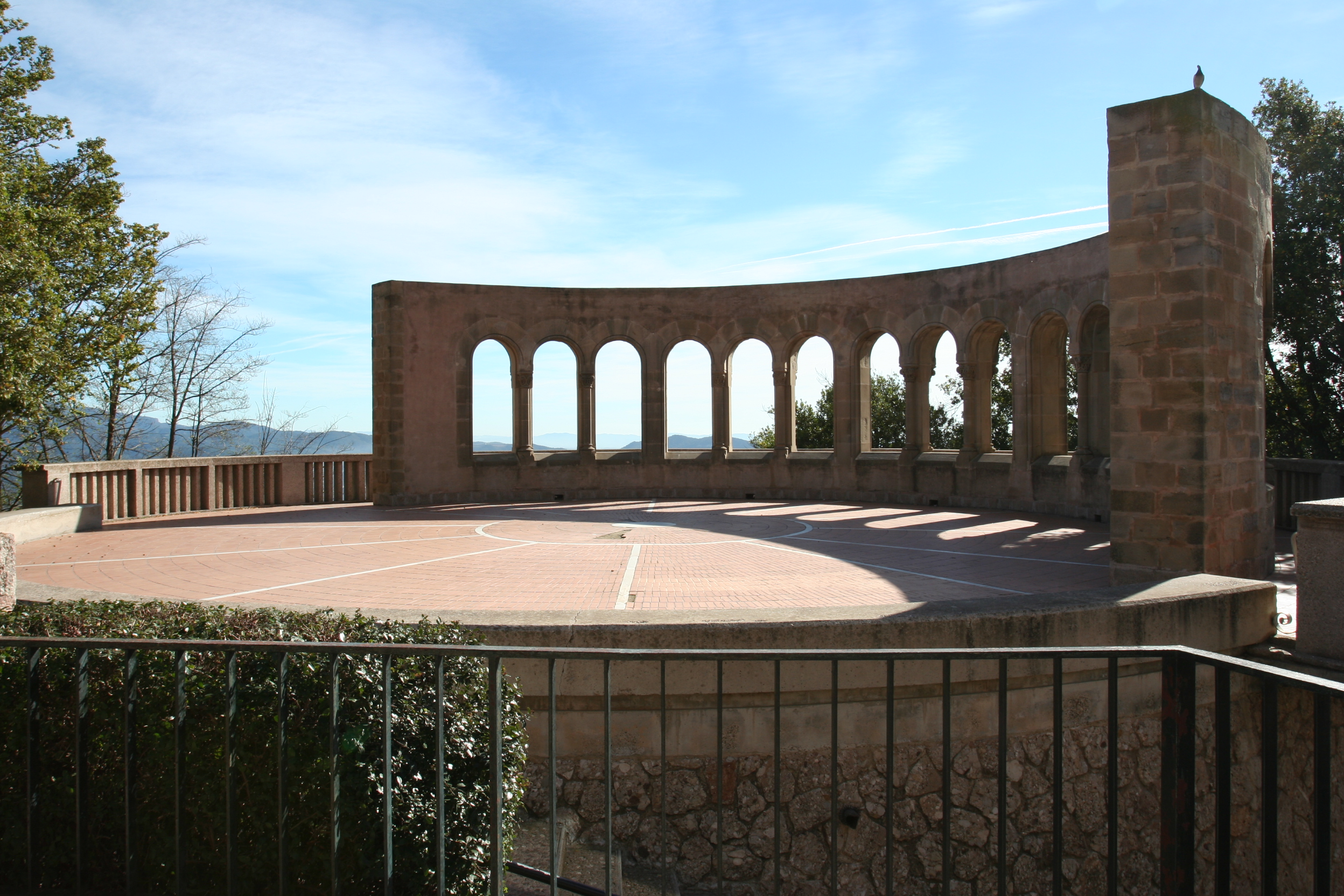
Terç de Montserrat mausoleum

Terç de Requetès de la Mare de Déu de Montserrat (Spanish: Tercio de Requetés de Nuestra Señora de Montserrat) was a battalion-type Carlist infantry unit, forming part of Nationalist troops during the Spanish Civil War. It is known as one of two Catalan units fighting against the Republicans. It is also recognized as the Nationalist unit which recorded the highest KIA ratio of 19%, with corresponding average Nationalist figure estimated at 6%. Its operational history consists mostly of long periods of inactivity or low-intensity skirmishes punctuated by two heavy combat engagements, culminating on 25 August 1937 and 19 August 1938.

== Origins ==
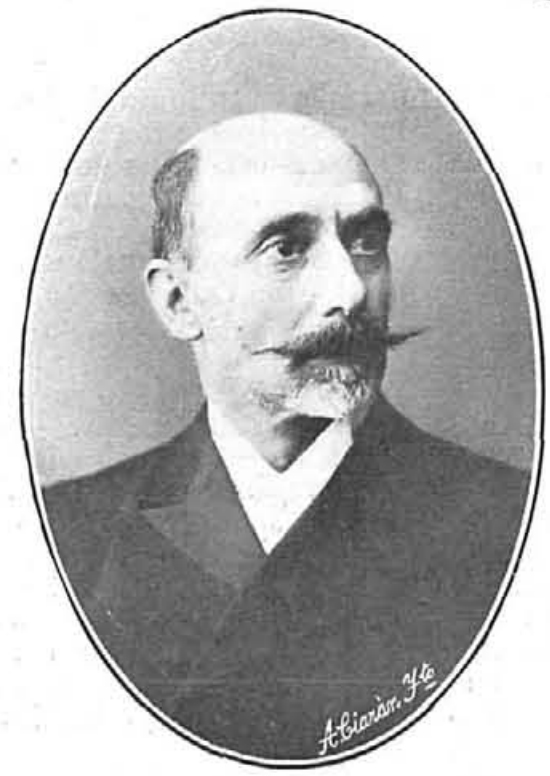
Joaquin Llorens Fernandez, 1909

Requeté was founded in 1907 by Juan María Roma as a Carlist sporting and outdoor grouping for teenagers; in 1913 it was re-organised by Joaquín Llorens as a paramilitary structure. Following a period of decay, in the early 1930s the organisation experienced enormous growth and in 1935 it was re-shaped along more sophisticated military lines by José Luis Zamanillo and José Enrique Varela. Prior to the Spanish Civil War the structure did not envision battalion-type units; its largest component was a requeté, roughly comparable to a company. In Catalonia the strength of the organization was estimated as 3,000 first-line volunteers and some 15,000 in auxiliary units. Following the failed coup of July 1936 they found themselves in total disarray, some killed, some captured, some in hiding and some fleeing the region.

Since August 1936 first Catalan requetés started to arrive in the Nationalist zone, either having crossed the frontline or travelling via France. The former Catalan Carlist leader Maurici de Sivatte and the former Catalan Requeté commander Josep María Cunill coined the idea of grouping them in a separate combat unit. Initially it was to be named after Saint George, but in September 1936 Virgin of Montserrat was chosen instead. As refugees kept arriving, in November the unit was set up as a battalion-type Carlist "Tercio" (in Catalan "Terç"), many of them created across the Nationalist-held regions. In line with common practice, commissioned army officers of Carlist leaning were delegated to form its command layer. Its combatants were almost exclusively volunteers, though at later stages there might have been some "false volunteers", since Catalan Republican POWs were offered to enlist as a way out of prison camps.

== Strength, organisation and armament ==
Terç de Requetés de la Mare de Déu de Montserrat commanders
starting date	rank	name
1936-12-15	capitan	Enrique Monteys Carbo
1937-08-03	teniente	Alfonso Fenollera Gonzalez (prov.)
1937-08-21	teniente	Francisco Roca Llopis (KIA)
1937-09-09	comandante	José M. Sentís Simeón
1937-11-17	capitan	Antonio de Ibarra Montis
1938-04-29	capitan	Luis Quiroga Nieto
1938-06-30	comandante	Jose Navas Sanjuan
1938-07-17	capitan	Manuel Martinez Millan de Priego
1938-08-29	alferez	Jose Daunis (prov.)
1938-09-22	comandante	Norberto Baturone Fernandez
1938-11-04	teniente	José M. Molinet Calverol (prov.)
1938-12-27	comandante	Antonio Miranda Guerra

Until January 1938 the battalion formed part of 5. División Organica from Zaragoza, itself within V. Cuerpo de Ejército and component of Ejercito del Norte. Then it was briefly assigned to few other different units (including a cavalry division, a reserve brigade and a Moroccan division), until in June 1938, when transported towards Extremadura, it was incorporated into 74. División (Ejercito del Centro), and shared its fate until the end of the war.

In late spring of 1937 the unit grew to around 200 men, divided into 2 companies; this structure endured until the Terç was decimated at Codo. During reconstruction the battalion was enhanced to 4 regular infantry companies and a machine-gun company, together with around 800 men (including around 20 commissioned officers). Its peculiarity was a separate shock section, formed in June 1938 and unheard of in other Carlist battalions. Support sub-units were reduced to medical services. Following losses suffered during the Battle of Ebro the Terç was brought back to its previous strength. In May 1939, shortly before its dissolution, the unit consisted of almost 900 men. The command was in Catalan.

In numerical terms the Terç was equivalent to a regular army battalion, though in comparison it remained undertrained and underarmed. Most of its soldiers have not undergone regular army training, their military education reduced to few months (in some cases few weeks) of drills either in the barracks or on the rear of the frontline. The firepower of the unit relied mostly on bolt-action type 7 mm rifles, the primary individual weapon. It was supplemented by various types of machine-guns, hand grenades and mortars (50mm and 81mm). The Terç had neither own artillery nor own transport.

== Social composition ==
Carlist standard

It is estimated that there were some 1,600 men fighting one time or another in the Terç. Due to data shortages no complete personal profiling is possible and all attempts to establish social base of the volunteers are founded on not necessarily correct statistical extrapolations. According to the information available, some 55% of the unit came from the working class, mostly farmers (25%), though also industry, workshop and service sector workers. The next most numerous group, 29%, were white-collar workers, either liberal professions or salary employees. Volunteers identified as "proprietors" formed 10%, though in most cases it is unclear what is meant by this category (probably landowners).

Around 83% of requetés were males between 18 and 30 years of age, most of them between 21 and 25 (35%). Further 13% were males between 30 and 40 years of age, with the remaining group formed by those younger than 18 (very few cases) and older than 40. There were two cases of father and son serving, apart from 9 pairs of brothers and one case of 3 brothers. Around 85% were bachelors and 12% were married, the remaining percentage either widowers or unknown. The sample available was in 91% composed of the Catalans with the remaining ones coming mostly from the Balearic Islands, though apart from other provinces single individuals originated even from the Canary Islands or Galicia. Two most represented Catalan provinces were Girona (35%) and Barcelona (31%), with visibly less volunteers originating from Lleida (16%) and Tarragona (8%). All the above statistical approximations, however, might be heavily distorted in case the data sample available is for some reason not representative.

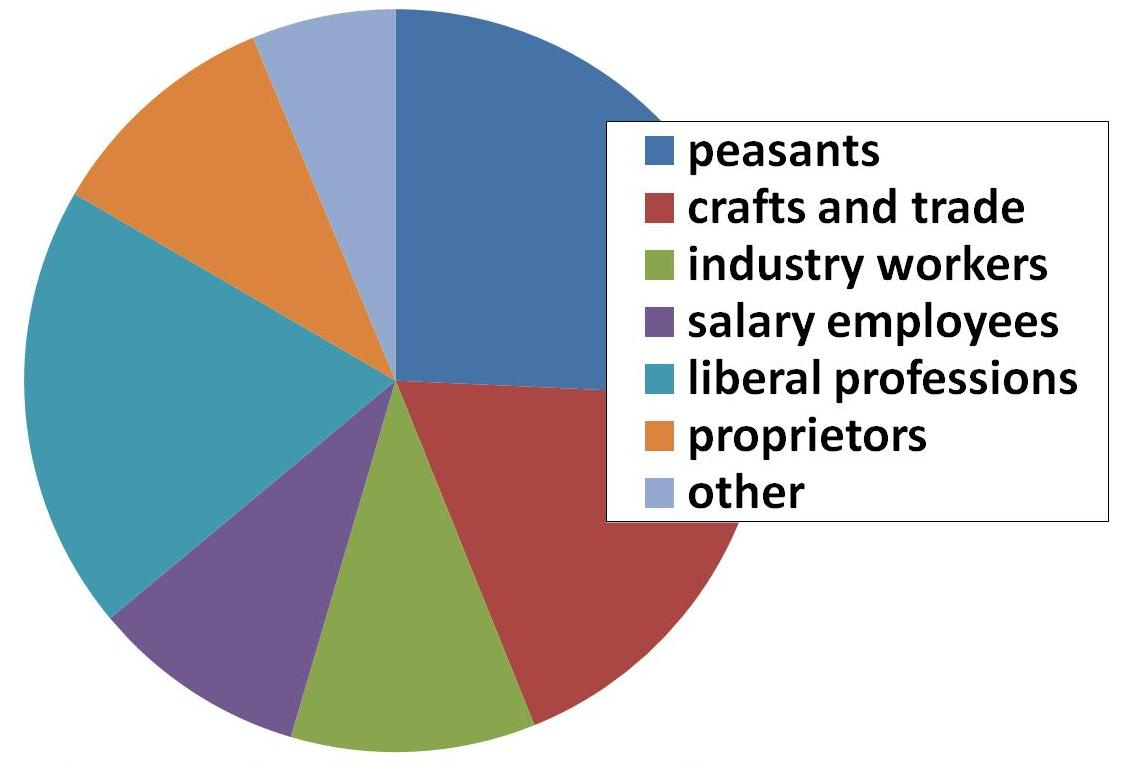
social composition of the Terç

There is no statistics available on political preferences of the soldiers. It is usually assumed that though some of them might have been related to La Lliga, APC or even to Alfonsism, the overwhelming majority of the volunteers were Carlists. It is also noted that during political amalgamation into Falange Española Tradicionalista, "los carlistas del Tercio de Montserrat brillan por su ausencia" in the new state party. During feasts the Terç soldiers greeted the Falangist centurias with cries of "¡Viva el Rey!" and "¡Muera el nacional-sindicalismo!"; confrontations between former Terç combatants and Falangists endured well into the late 1940s, not infrequently ending in riots. 26 of the Terç combatants became later Roman Catholic priests.

== Operational history ==
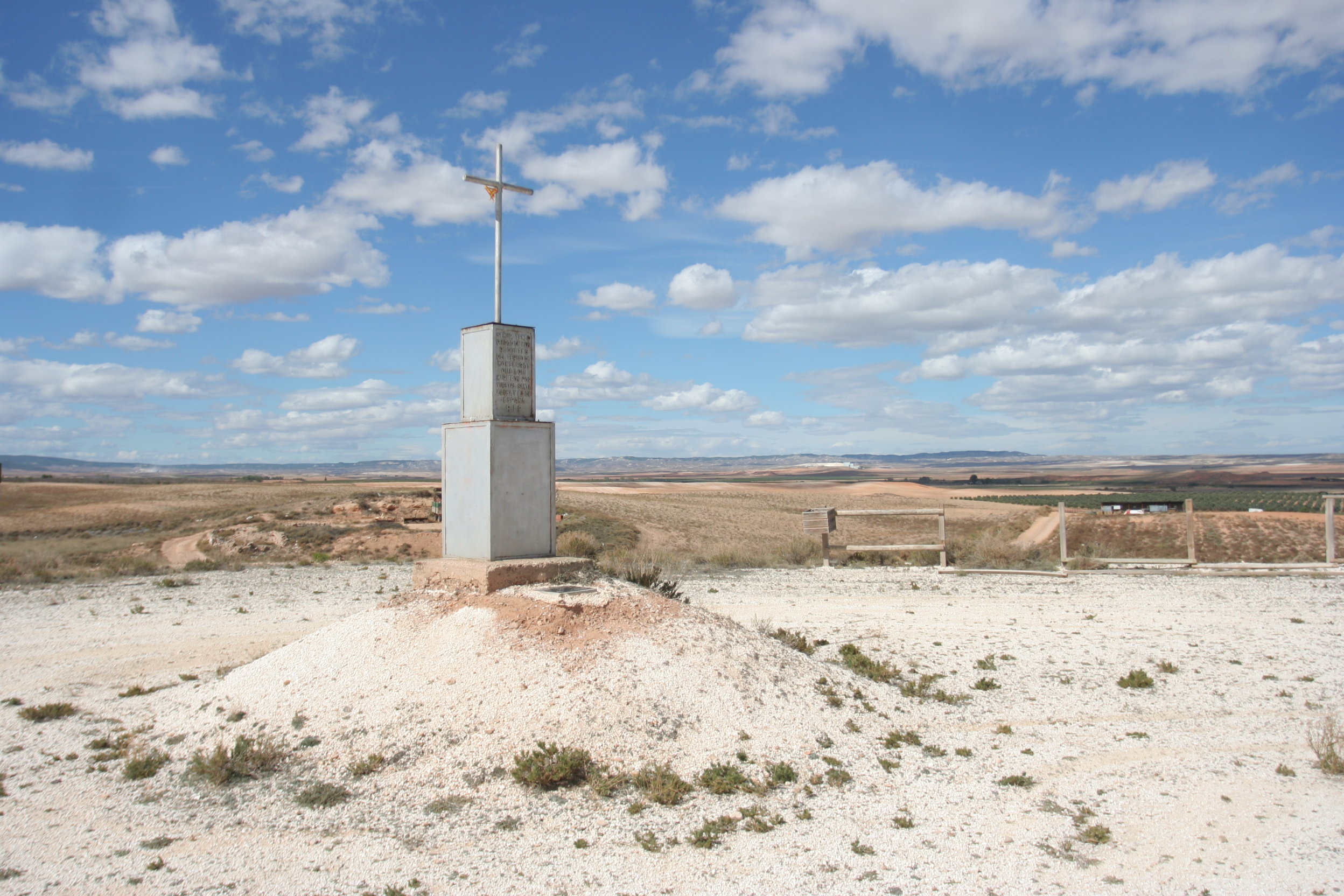
Codo, Monte Calvario perimeter

Even before the unit was fully formed its sub-components were deployed on the Aragon front in the sector of Belchite; in early January 1937 the Terç took positions around the neighboring town of Codo. The following 7 months produced almost no combat engagement until in August 1937 the Republicans mounted an offensive towards Zaragoza. Following initial skirmishes on 23 August, the next day the unit stood its ground until it was almost entirely encircled. On 25 August remnants of the Terç broke through to own lines. Having lost around 150 KIA the battalion ceased to exist as operational unit and was withdrawn to Zaragoza.

Between October 1937 and January 1938 the Terç was being reconstructed in the rear, in Torres de Berrellén near the Aragonese capital; plans to merge it with another Tercio, considered at that time, were eventually abandoned. Then it was deployed on the frontline at southern slopes of Montes Universales in the Alto Tajo region (Guadalajara province). The unit remained in the area until June 1938 (initially Mazarete – Huertahernando sector, later Mirabueno sector), taking part in light and occasional skirmishes and suffering minor casualties.

KIA casualties
campaign	#
Codo (1937)	140
Huesca (1937)	1
Torres de Berrellen (1937)	1
Guadalajara (1938)	2
Ebro (1938)	153
Extremadura (1939)	20
Catalonia (1939)	1

In June 1938 the battalion was transferred by improvised means from Alto Tajo to Sierra de Gredos (Ávila province), in July to be directed towards Extremadura and to take part in closing of the Merida pocket. As little resistance was encountered, more requetés ended up in hospitals due to enormous heat rather than due to enemy resistance. In late July the Terç was loaded onto train and via Salamanca, Aranda de Duero and Zaragoza urgently transferred to Catalonia, to the Ebro bend.

On 29 July 1938 the Terç was deployed in the Vilalba dels Arcs sector (Tarragona province) and for 10 days successfully fought a defensive battle. Then for a week it was shuttled by trucks and on foot between different sectors with no real combat until it returned to Vilalba, this time with offensive assignment. During the attack of 19 August the Terç lost around 60 KIA and 170 WIA on the Cuatro Caminos crossroad and was engaged in heavy fighting also during the following days, until on 30 August it was moved to more quiet sectors. Total losses reached 700, including 150 KIA. While the recovering wounded were coming back to line and new recruits were arriving, the Terç remained in the Ebro bend on vigilance and patrolling duties. Massive casualties suffered, sometimes described as self-immolation, are subject to controversy until today.

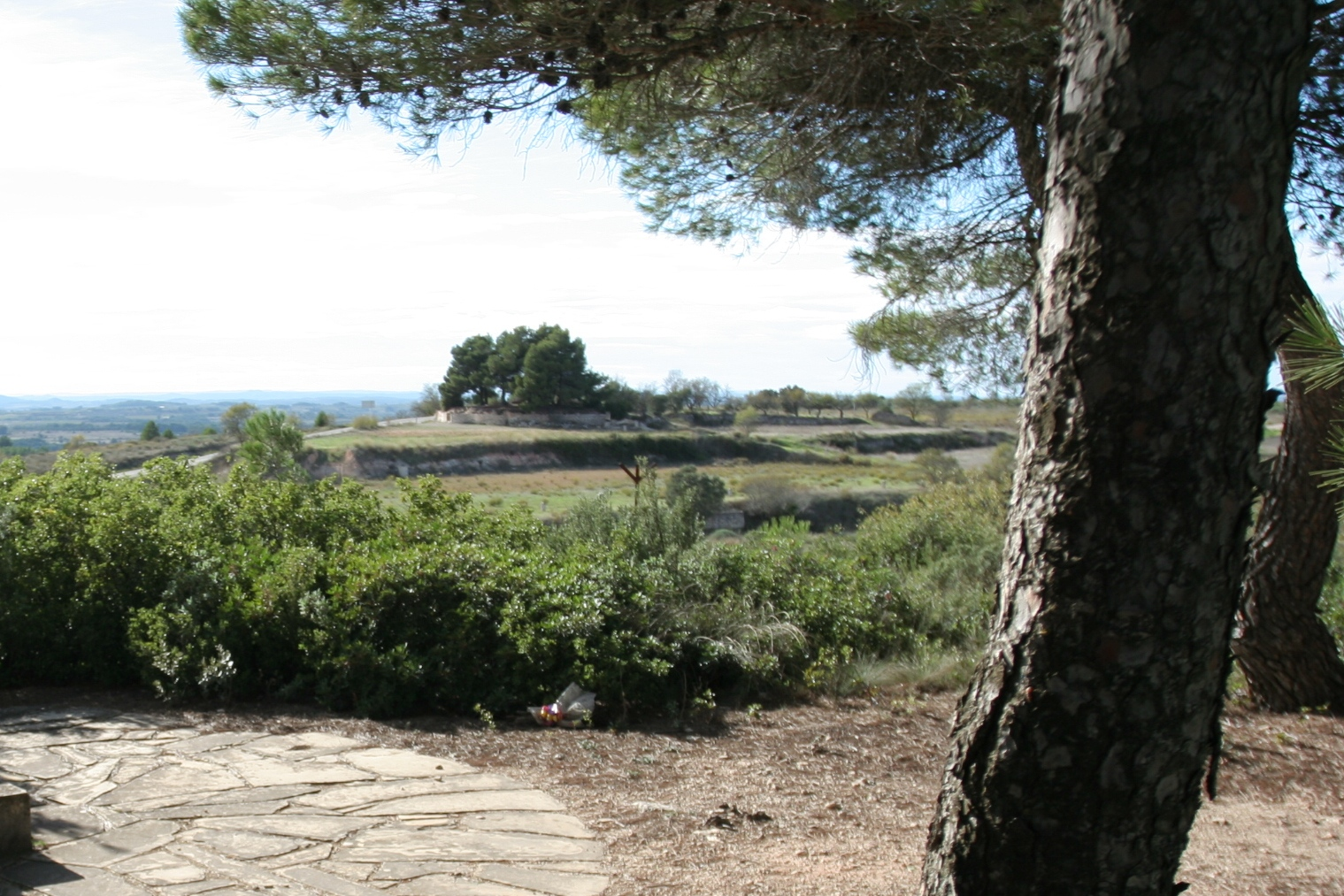
Vilalba dels Arcs, Cuatro Caminos

In mid-December 1938 in Fatarella the battalion was loaded onto trains and in early January 1939 it was deployed back in southern Extremadura, this time engaged in defensive operations against the last Republican offensive of the war. During the counter-offensive the unit captured Valsequillo before early February it was transported by train to Navalmoral. It was then transferred to Chozas de Canales (Toledo) and in late March moved by trucks to Albarreal de Tajo, advancing with virtually no resistance. The Terç ended the war in Menasalbas.

In April the unit remained in Western Castile until it took part in Victory Parade in Madrid on 19 May 1939. It entered Barcelona on 31 July, taking part in local celebrations until it was stationed in the Jaime I barracks. The process of releasing most soldiers took until mid-September; the ones still in service were transferred to Moncada barracks. The Terç was officially dissolved on 26 October 1939, its standard deposed at the Montserrat Monastery.

== Reception and legacy ==
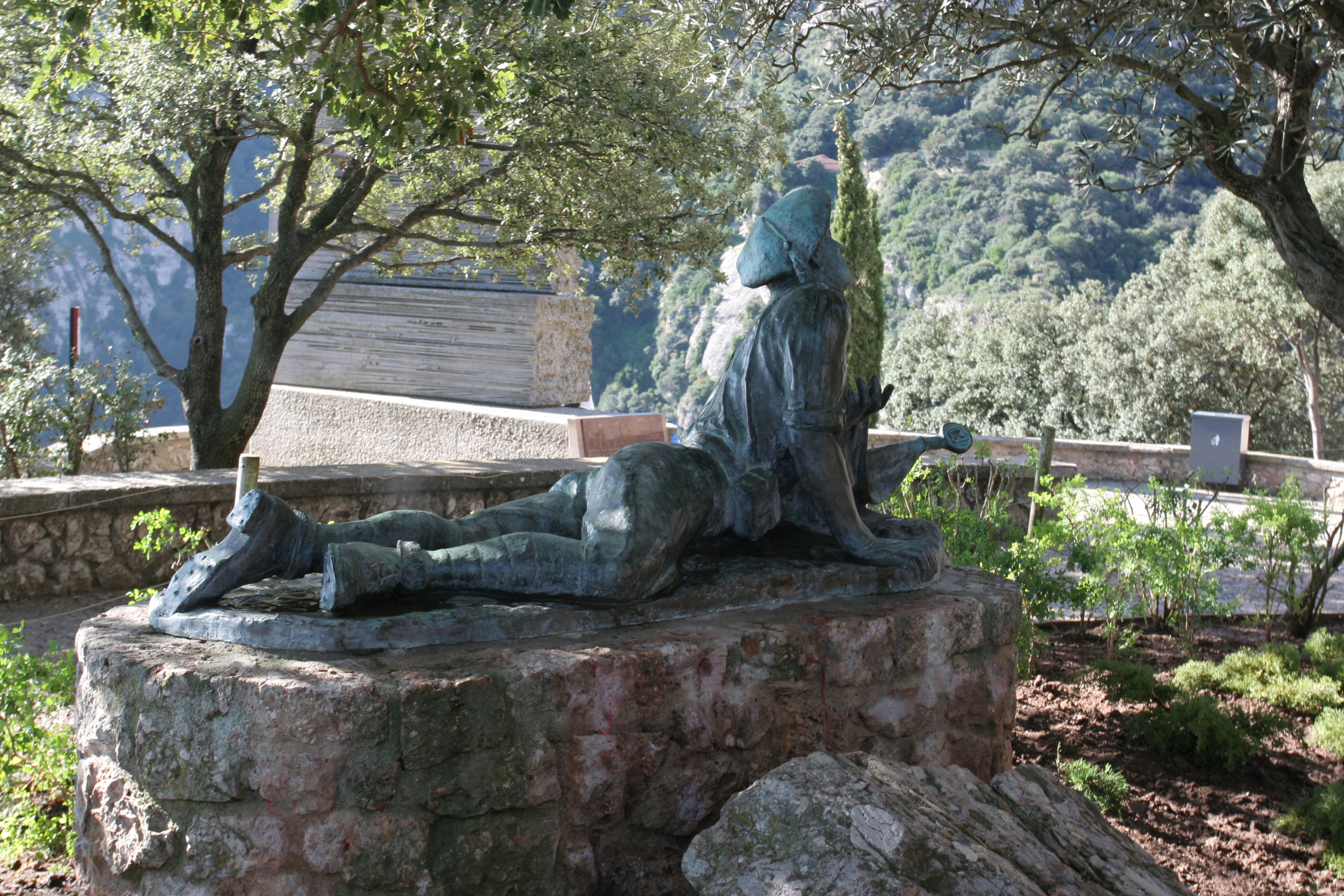
monument to Catalan requetés

History of the Terç was acknowledged though not celebrated by the Francoist regime. In 1943 the 1. and 2. company of the Terç were awarded Cruz Laureada de San Fernando, the highest Spanish military honor, for their gallant performance at Codo; in 1943 the same honor was conferred individually upon Jaime Bofill-Gasset i Amil (1915-1989). No unit in the Francoist army referred to the Terç.

In 1955 the Terç ex-combatant, Salvador Nonell Brú, published its history. The bid to construct a mausoleum located within the Montserrat complex was initially opposed by Franco, who claimed that all the fallen should rest at Valle de los Caídos; the mausoleum was finally opened in 1961. In 1965 a requeté monument was unveiled in front of it; the original site layout was blurred in the decades to come. Commemorating crosses were erected also in Codo and in Vilalba dels Arcs. Today the Mausoleum remains closed and visitors are admitted by individual appointment; it is owned by Hermandad de Ex Combatientes del Tercio de Requeté de Nostra Señora de Montserrat, the organisation founded in the late 1950s.

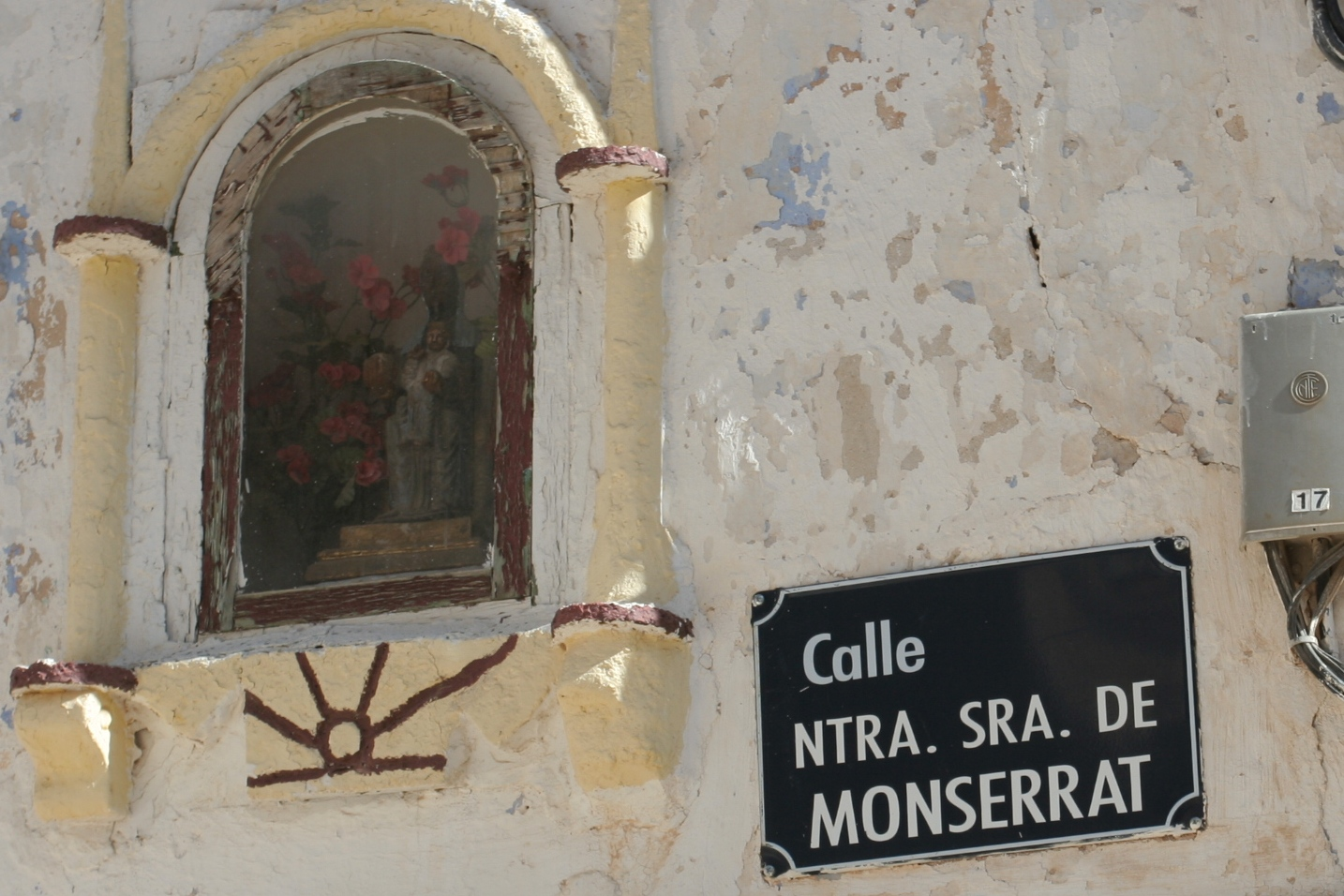
Codo, former Calle Tercio de Nuestra Señora de Montserrat

History of the Terç played vital role in mobilisation of Catalan Carlism during Francoism, helping to sustain its Traditionalist and Catalan identity. Commemorating the fallen and the living has always been vital point of annual Carlist Montserrat gatherings. Hermandad served also as semi-official regional Carlist organisation, though it was involved in controversies within the Traditionalist realm. The RENACE group centred around Sivatte accused its moving spirit, Nonell Brú, of appeasement versus the regime; the Sivattistas considered it outraging that memory of Terç was enveloped in the Francoist propaganda.

Following transición the Terç is criticised by democratic groupings, who charge the unit with war crimes. They also demand that requeté monuments are dismantled as incompatible with Ley de Memoria Histórica. The Montserrat monument and sites elsewhere are periodically vandalised by unknown perpetrators. According to the internet poll by Catalanist Racó Català service, 77% of respondents consider the Terç soldiers traitors. Streets formerly named after the unit have dropped "Tercio" and are now referring to "Our Lady of Montserrat". The last combatant of the Terç died in 2019.

== See also ==
- Carlism
- Requetés
- Spanish Civil War
- Monastery of Montserrat
