= Maurici de Sivatte i de Bobadilla =

Spanish politician

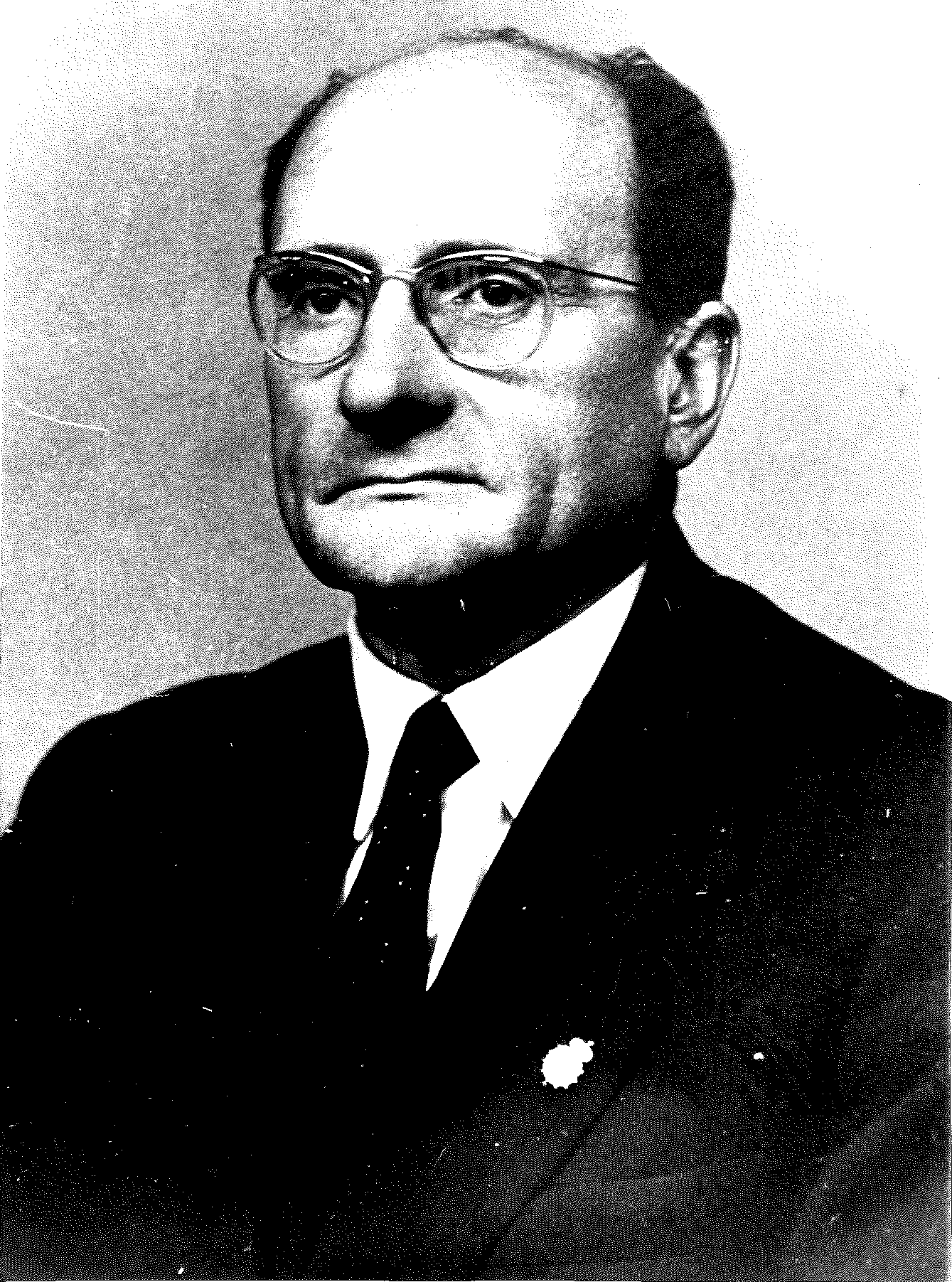
- Born: Maurici de Sivatte i de Bobadilla; 1901; Arenys de Mar
- Died: 1980 (aged 78–79); Barcelona
- Occupation: lawyer
- Known for: politician
- Political party: CT

Maurici de Sivatte i de Bobadilla (Spanish: Mauricio de Sivatte y de Bobadilla) (1901–1980) was a Spanish Carlist politician. He is known as leader of Catalan Carlism in two separate strings, briefly in the early 1930s and then in the decade of the 1940s. He is also recognized as the moving spirit behind RENACE, a Traditionalist splinter faction set up in 1958.

== Family and youth ==
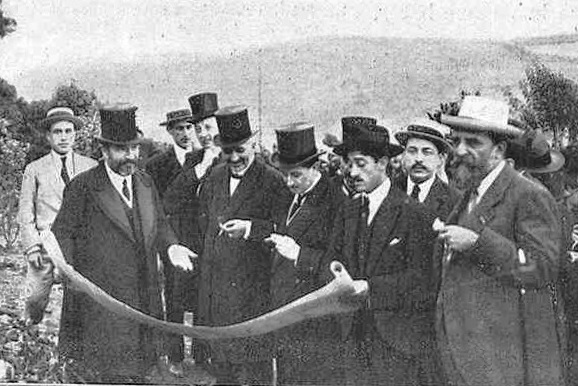
Sivatte Llopart (2fR) in 1915

The Sivatte family originated from France and was related to the Provençal town of La Colle; its members were already recorded in the 17th century. André de Sivatte was the first to settle in Spain; in the early 19th century he served first as a French customs officer and later as official in the French consulate in Barcelona; he married a Spaniard from Calonge. Their son and Maurici's paternal grandfather, Edmundo Félix Sivatte i Vilar, was born already in the Catalan capital, though it is rather his wife, María de las Mercedes de Llopart y Xiqués, who became recognized as active in Catholic charity organizations. Their son and Maurici's father, Manuel Josép María de Sivatte i Llopart (1865-1931), worked as a Barcelona lawyer and grew to one of the leaders of the Catalan Carlism: he was president of Círculo Tradicionalista de Barcelona, member of Junta Provincial de Barcelona and Junta Regional de Cataluña. In recognition of his merits, in 1899 the claimant conferred upon him the title of marqués de Vallbona. As he contributed to "La Octubrada", a series of minor Carlist revolts in different Catalan locations in October 1900, he had to flee the country. Upon his return to Spain he co-founded Fomento de la Prensa Tradicionalista, the company which re-launched El Correo Catalán; he was also one of major landholders in the Roquetes-Nou Barris area.

Manuel Sivatte married Margarita de Bobadilla y Martínez de Arizala (1870-1905), also descendant to a Carlist family. Her father and Maurici's maternal grandfather, Mauricio de Bobadilla y Escrivá de Romaní, was head of Navarrese Carlism and served as deputy from Estella in Cortes Constituentes between 1869 and 1871, later on contributing to Asamblea de Vevey and siding with Carlos VII during the Third Carlist War. Manuel and Margarita had 5 children, all brought up in fervently Catholic ambience: Manuel, Merceditas, Carles Edmund, Jaume and Maurici. After early death of their mother it was the paternal grandmother, Mercedes Llopart, who assisted her son – married again – in bringing up the children.

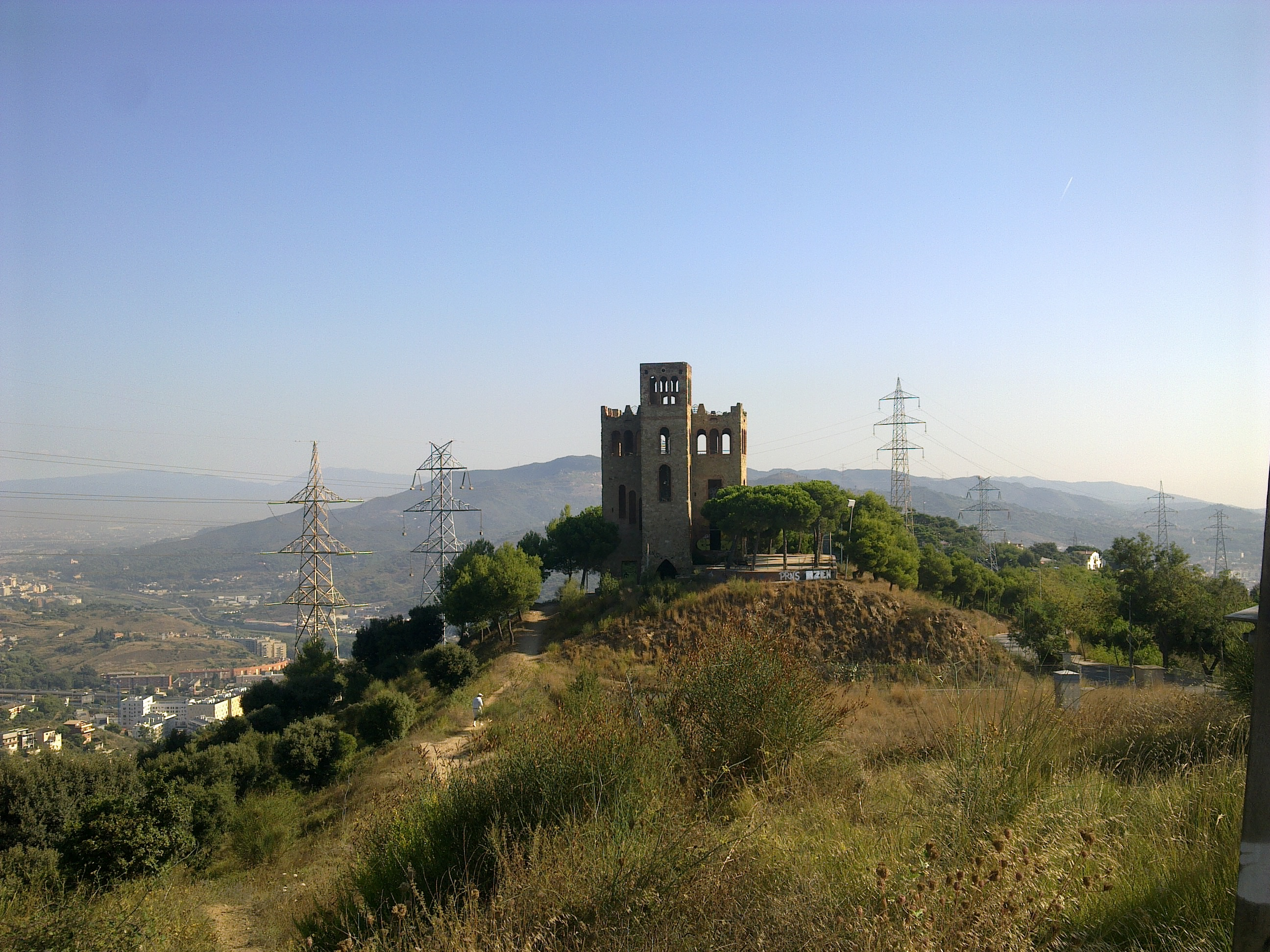
Sivatte's Torre Baró estate

Following his initial education the young Maurici entered Facultad de Derecho of Universidad de Barcelona; he graduated in law in 1923 and joined the local Colegio de Abogados. In 1924 he married Asunción Algueró de Ugarriza (1901-1970), the native of Tarragona; they settled in family estate in the Torre Baró quarter of Barcelona. The couple had 13 children. Some of them became nuns and friars; among these, Rafael de Sivatte i Algueró made his name as scholar in biblical studies. Some were active in business; the most notable one, Jaime de Sivatte i Algueró, grew to president of Asociación Nacional Española Fabricantes de Hormigón Preparado and vice-president of Asociación Nacional de Empresarios Fabricantes de Aridos. The grandson of Maurici Sivatte, Carlos-Javier Ram de Víu y de Sivatte, is procurador in the judicial district of Barcelona.

== Early political career ==
Sivatte's beginnings in politics were facilitated by prestigious position of his father, who in the 1920s remained one of the leaders of local Barcelona societé. At that time Manuel de Sivatte was getting somewhat detached from mainstream Carlism. Already in 1922 he signed a manifesto declaring Alfonso XIII a prospective legitimate Traditionalist heir as the direct Carlist dynasty was already certain to extinguish; when entering the Barcelona Diputación Provincial he was representing Lliga Regionalista of Francesc Cambó. By some Carlists he was considered traitor to their cause. Initially it was his older sons joining their father in various political initiatives.

In the late 1920s also Maurici, though member of the local Circulo Jaimista, was increasingly engaged in activities of La Lliga. Other sources suggest he joined efforts to build a "partido católico duro", promoted by the local ecclesiastical authorities as a Catholic alliance holding together different breeds of ultraconservative, conservative and right-wing groupings. In 1927 he was already a recognized member of the Barcelona societé, assuming prestigious roles during various local feasts. In the final years of the dictatorship Maurici Sivatte got engaged in Organización Corporativa Nacional, a peculiar primoderiverista structure functioning partially as arbitrage board and partially as labor organization; he formed part of its Comité Paritario covering the cotton industry and continued with this role also in the Dictablanda period.

== Republic ==
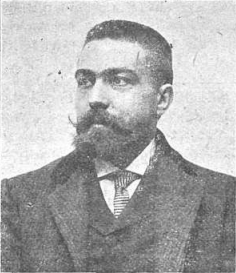
Miguel Junyent

Though in the 1920s Sivatte's links with Traditionalism remained dormant, the advent of the Republic and its militant secularism boosted his Carlist activities. Already in June 1931 he co-founded Reacción, a weekly which pledged to confront Liberal and atheist "acción demagógica, disolvente y corrosiva" by supporting traditional values. In April 1932 he unsuccessfully ran for the newly established Catalan parliament, standing in Girona and forming part of Coalició Católica Gironina alliance. Once three Traditionalist branches united in Comunión Tradicionalista, Sivatte got engaged in its propaganda works. In May 1932 he formed part of comisión providing financial support to Semana Tradicionalista, though he was not noted as one of the speakers himself. In June he contributed to opening of Circulo Central Tradicionalista in Barcelona and became its vice-president, later growing to full presidency; following a related Carlist manifestation he was briefly detained by the authorities.

It remains a bit of a paradox that within the Catalan Carlism Sivatte, himself an ex-Liguero, formed part of the faction which advocated bold stand and doctrinal intransigence, as opposed to the group of older leaders used to behind-the-scene dealings. In May 1933 Miguel Junyent i Rovira resigned from the regional Catalan jefatura and Sivatte was nominated his replacement. According to a hagiographic biographer, the claimant Don Alfonso Carlos agreed that the new activist format required new dynamic leaders; according to a progressist historian, it was the reactionary Integrists who enforced the decision. The change brought about the threat of a breakup in Catalan Carlism and its internal stability remained very shaky. The assignment lasted less than a year and was marked mostly by efforts to build the regional paramilitary structures, Requeté; despite his position of regional leader, Sivatte did not run in the 1933 elections. In March 1934 the older politicians fought back and ensured royal order which put Lorenzo María Alier on top of the regional organization, with Sivatte downgraded to Subjefe Regional.

requete buildup, mid-1930s

As provincial deputy leader Sivatte focused on Requeté buildup and propaganda activities, occasionally replacing Alier during Carlist gatherings. On the national level he displayed his already trademark intransigence speaking against an alliance with the Alfonsinos, advocated by the likes of conde Rodezno and Pradera. Following the Popular Front triumph he represented Catalan Carlism during talks with local UME leaders, drafting first plans of anti-Republican insurgency. One of them was almost put into action in the spring of 1936; when recalled in the very last minute, Sivatte formed part of the Catalan Requeté command. According to one source, it was Sivatte who suggested that Alier, who resigned early that year, be replaced as regional jefe by Tomàs Caylà. The new leader entrusted Sivatte with the task of collecting funds for anticipated military action. He also went on negotiating with UME and was unhappy about their vision; the generals imagined the coup to topple the frentepopulista government, while Sivatte intended to topple the Republic.

== Civil War ==
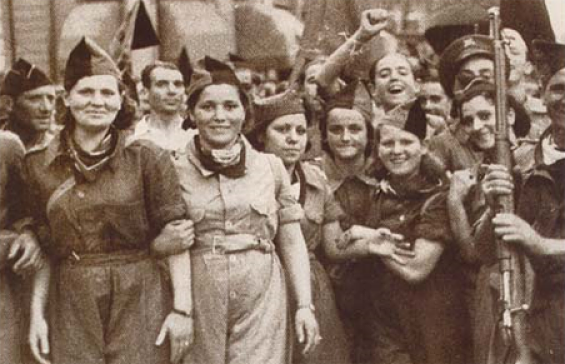
Barcelona anarchist militia, 1936

Working closely with UME on military dispositions of Catalan requetés, Sivatte was deeply involved in preparing detailed Carlist plans for rebellion both in Barcelona and in Catalonia. When the news of final deal with the military having been concluded arrived from Pamplona, on July 18 Sivatte and Caylá met to issue local insurgency orders, effective for the next day. From that moment onwards command over some 3,000 first-line volunteers and 15,000 auxiliaries passed to Catalan requeté leader Cunill. As the rebels failed, during two days of fighting the Catalan requetés were reduced to total disarray, some killed, some captured, some gone into hiding and some fleeing the region. Exact whereabouts of Sivatte are not clear; once the Republicans regained full control over Barcelona he went underground. Early August 1936 he managed to leave Catalonia for Marseille on a ship, disguised as a Polish citizen.

From France Sivatte transferred to the Nationalist-held territory and following the conquest of Gipuzkoa, in September he settled in San Sebastián. It is there he co-founded Comisión Carlista para Asuntos de Cataluña, a body set up mostly to assists the Catalan exiles though engaged also in intelligence activities. As the Carlist refugees who either crossed the frontline or travelled via France started to arrive in Aragón, Sivatte moved to Zaragoza. Together with Cunill, who narrowly escaped execution and made it to Nationalist zone, he coined an idea of organising a requeté battalion composed entirely of the Catalans; the unit was born in December 1936 as Terç de Requetès de la Mare de Déu de Montserrat and Sivatte dedicated himself to its formation. He was also engaged in Frentes y Hospitales, the Carlist-led organisation called to treat the wounded and assist those serving on the frontline, though there are somewhat conflicting accounts of his exact role.

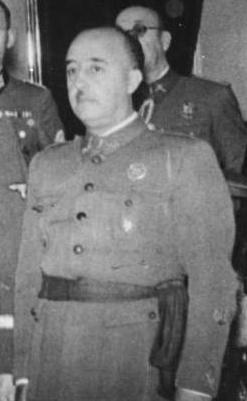
Franco, 1940

Sivatte did not enter the Carlist wartime executive, Junta Nacional Carlista de Guerra, and did not take part in crucial party meetings of early 1937, dealing with the looming threat of forced amalgamation into an official state party. However, he is known as member of the intransigent faction, fiercely opposed to unification designs advanced by Franco. Following Unification Decree he chose to look for workarounds. As one of them, Comisión para Asuntos, constantly attacked by the FET Catalan branch, was renamed to Jefatura Regional de la Comunión at unspecified time in 1938. It was probably at that point that Sivatte was nominated its head, assuming jefatura of Catalan Carlism for the second time. As Traditionalism was getting increasingly marginalized in the emergent Francoist political milieu, Sivatte urged the new Carlist regent-claimant to take a decisive stance. He considered the regency formula unfortunate and contributing to moral disarmament of Carlism; his letters to the regent in polite but firm terms recommended that Don Javier terminates the regency and declares who the legitimate king is.

== Catalan jefe ==
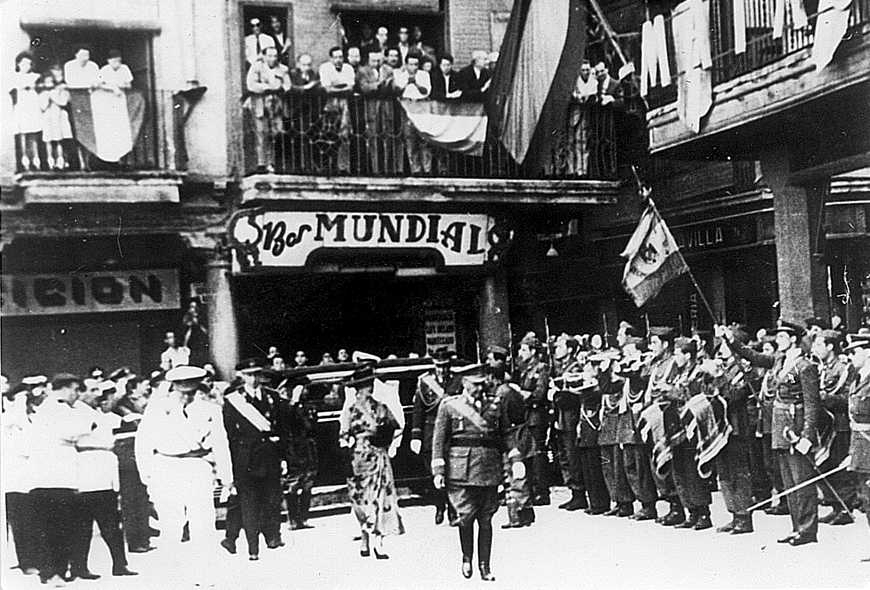
Franquism in Catalonia

Following the Nationalist conquest of Catalonia Sivatte rushed to Barcelona and embarked on hectic reconstruction of Carlist structures in the region. His efforts were soon frustrated when the local military commander closed all just re-opened circulos and ordered Sivatte out of Catalonia; the exile lasted a few months. The incident convinced Sivatte that no modus vivendi with the new system was possible. Within Carlism he formed the intransigent faction, headed by Manuel Fal Conde, and pursued the strategy of preserving Traditionalist identity by refusal to join any Francoist structures. The official response differed. In 1940, during the first anniversary of Nationalist conquest of Barcelona, Sivatte was detained in the Modelo prison; in 1942, during the Carlist Mártires de la Tradición feast, he was joined by commander of the IV Región Militar, general Alfredo Kindelán. Relations between Catalan Carlists and Falangists remained extremely tense, not infrequently producing riots. Eventually the regime sort of acknowledged Carlist potential in the region; according to some the Traditionalists were allowed freedom unknown elsewhere and emerged as the most dynamic and well-organized Carlist regional organization nationwide.

In 1943 Sivatte co-signed Reclamación de Poder, a document which demanded from Franco dismantling of national-sindicalist regime and introduction of Traditionalist monarchy. This was his last action within the party executive. Increasingly perplexed by contacts with the Alfonsinos and fearing some sort of dynastic compromise, as means of protest in 1944 Sivatte resigned from Junta Nacional Carlista, though he retained his post of the Catalan jefe. He was also concerned with what he perceived as Carlist lack of direction, political bewilderment and especially the inactive regency of Don Javier. In a late 1945 document he firmly denied dynastic rights to Don Juan and Don Carlos Pio and recommended that the regent assumes a bold and decisive stand; other documents soon followed. Executing his strategy, Sivatte co-engineered a grand Carlist demonstration in Pamplona in December 1945; the event ended in riots and detentions.

Carlist standard

The years of 1947-1949 led to deterioration in relations between Sivatte on one side and Don Javier and Fal on the other. The Catalan jefe insisted that Junta de Jefes Regionales y Provinciales formally demands that Don Javier sorts out the 11-year-old regency puzzle, possibly by calling a grand Carlist assembly, but Fal thwarted this attempt and watered down the ultimate message. He also resisted the pressure engineered by Sivatte during the 1947 Aplec de Montserrat. Ley de Sucesión, supported by Fal in the referendum, made Sivatte believe that Franco opened the way for a distant Alfonsist restoration and pushed him for increasingly ultimative tone. The 1948 Aplec de Montserrat, intended as most bold demonstration of Carlist intransigence so far, was banned by the authorities with no protest recorded from national Traditionalist leaders. When Catalan Carlists issued another letter, in February 1949 Fal attempted a last minute rescue mission and travelled to Barcelona, only to be informed that "por aquel camino el carlismo no podía caminar". In March 1949 Don Javier dismissed Sivatte as the Catalan jefe.

== Outcast ==
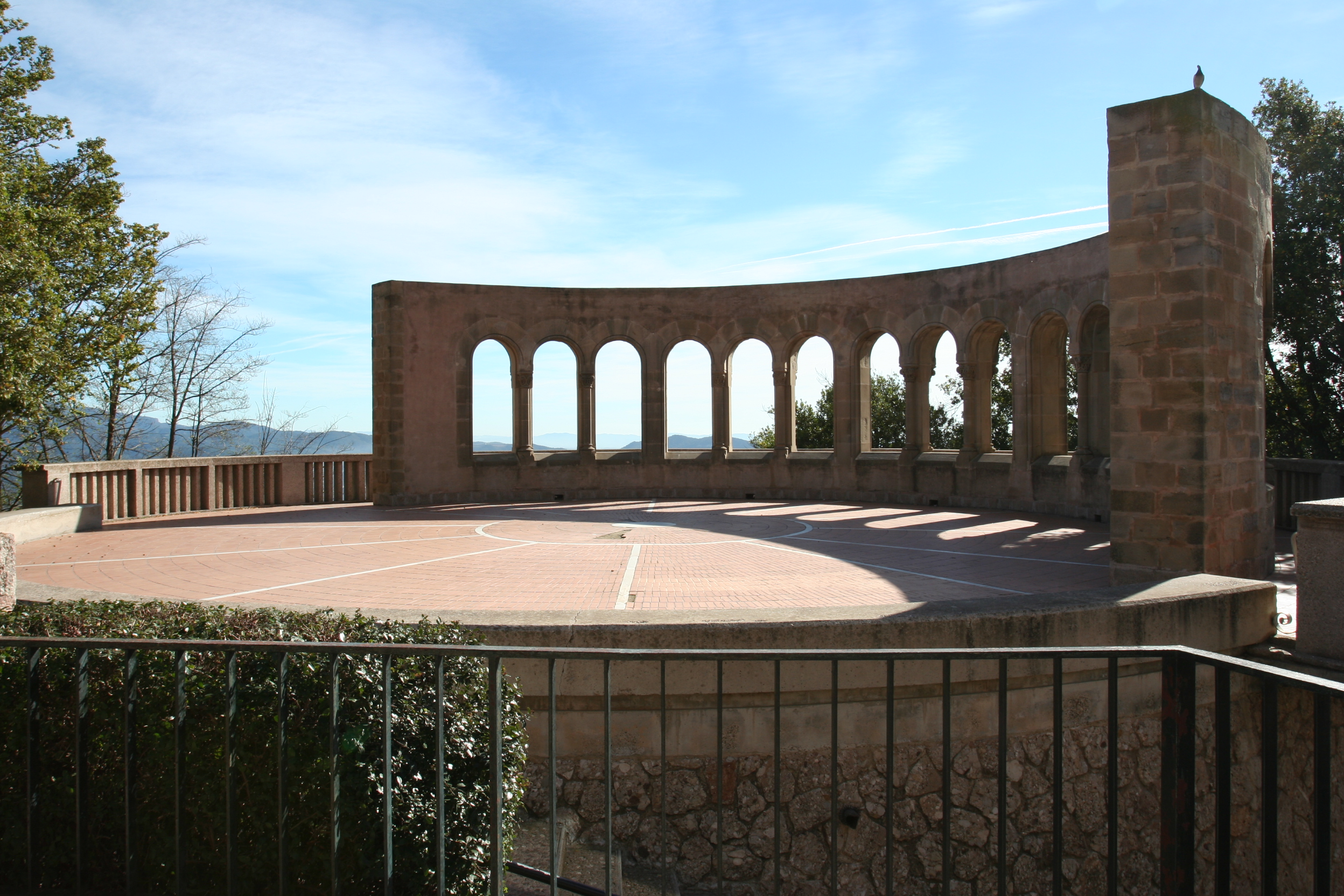
Montserrat requeté mausoleum

Though some scholars claim that in 1949 Sivatte was also expulsed from Carlism, other authors maintain that he voluntarily separated himself from the organization. As he was followed by a number of collaborators, the mainstream Catalan Carlism was forced into a minority position. The breakup was best demonstrated by two Aplecs de Montserrat, since 1949 organized each year separately by the Javieristas and by the Sivattistas. The latter did not assume a formal shape and remained a loose group; their organizational emanation was Centro Familiar Montserrat, functioning as a social circulo rather than as a political body.

Politically Sivatte maintained his previous stand: recognition of Don Javier as legitimate leader combined with opposition to regency formula, to dynastic compromise and to appeasement versus Francoism. Except Catalonia and partially Navarre he failed to mobilize much support. This changed in the early 1950s, when calls for terminating the regency became widespread and endorsed even by Fal himself. When during Congreso Eucaristico in Barcelona in 1952 Don Javier effectively declared himself the king, Sivatte could have claimed a personal triumph. This so-called Acta de Barcelona was immediately followed by a number of statements which seemed to play down the declaration, vacillation which started to erode Sivatte's recognition of Don Javier.

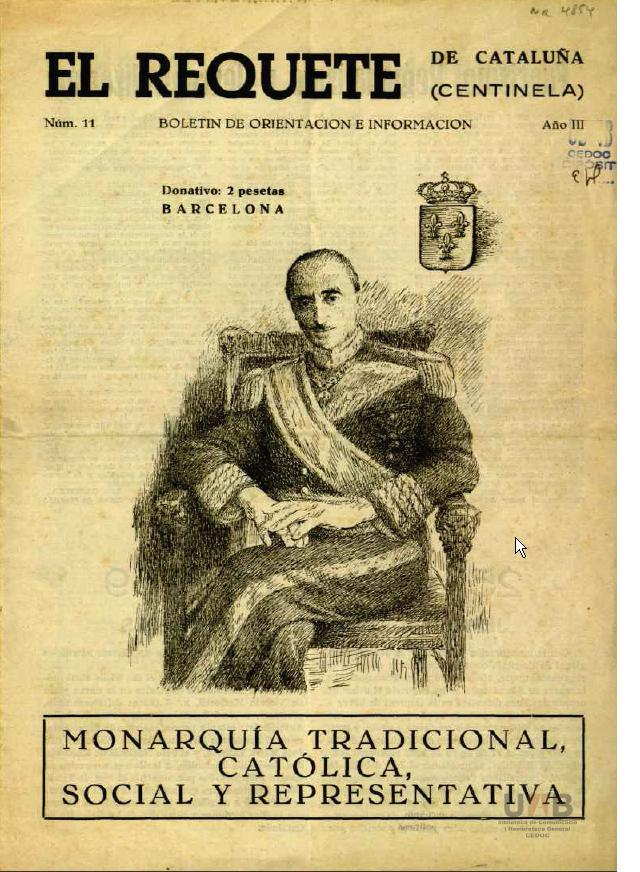
Don Javier as king on cover of a Carlist periodical, 1959

Sivatte's stance versus Francoism remained hostile. When efforts to construct a mausoleum of fallen requetés in Montserrat reached a breakthrough in 1952, Sivatte opposed the project since it was formatted as part of the Francoist propaganda exercise. In return he and other intransigents used to be detained and fined, measures effectively preventing their taking part in the Montserrat aplecs, e.g. in 1954. When in mid-1950s Carlism abandoned its opposition strategy and started to seek some rapprochement with Francoism, the Sivattistas responded with massive criticism. ¿Ha resignado Don Javier su misión en el general Franco? – asked their note of 1955. On the other hand, the deposition of Fal seemed to ease the relationship with Javieristas, especially that in 1956 Don Javier made conciliatory gestures towards Sivatte and that year the two groups agreed to stage common Montserrat feast.

In April 1956 the Sivattistas met with Don Javier in Perpignan. The latter agreed to sign a document rejecting any dynastic compromise with the Alfonsinos and with Franco, though he did not agree to sign as a king and afterwards insisted on keeping the document private. Sivatte, fearing another reverse step, refused; moreover, he presented the declaration at Junta Suprema de las Regiones, a freshly formed and somewhat rebellious Carlist body bent on preventing a pro-Juanista and pro-Francoist turn. The intention was to keep Don Javier in a crystal box and to separate him from daily political business, but the new Carlist political leader José María Valiente mounted a counter-offensive and forced dissolution of the Junta. Sivatte responded by publishing the Perpignan paper as Manifesto a los españoles. At that point he was already convinced that loyalty to Don Javier reached a dead end and that a competitive solution is needed.

== RENACE ==
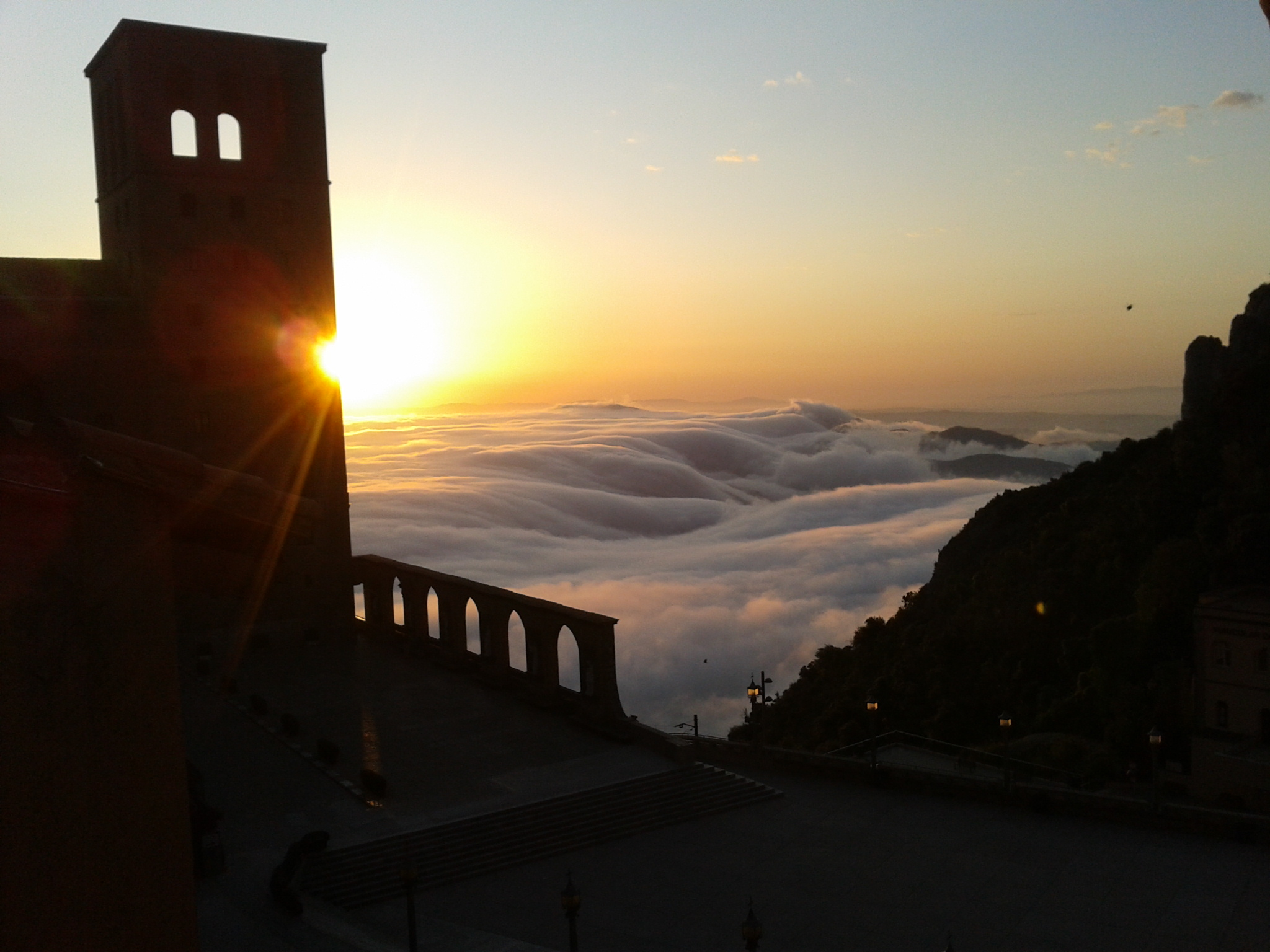
dawn at Montserrat Monastery

Once he decided to abandon unreliable and wavering Don Javier, Sivatte started to look for alternatives. In 1957 he held consultations with Don Antonio, representative of another Borbón branch considered legitimate heir by the Carloctavista faction, but the talks bore no fruit. Don Carlos Hugo, the oldest son of Don Javier, made a fulminant entry on Spanish political stage in May 1957 and was greeted by enormous enthusiasm of the crowd gathered on the Aplec of Montejurra; many Sivattistas concluded that the years of apathy were over. Some of them re-joined the Javieristas, though it is not clear to what extent Sivatte himself considered Don Carlos Hugo an alternative to Don Javier; he was suspicious about pro-Francoist tones of his addresses. When in late 1957 a large group of Traditionalists leaning towards dynastic accord with the Alfonsinos declared Don Juan the legitimate heir, Sivatte felt genuine Carlism should be immediately given new momentum.

During the Aplec de Montserrat of April 20, 1958, Sivatte declared formation of Regencia Nacional y Carlista de Estella (RENACE). The body was intended as a depositary of genuine Carlist principles and styled itself as "autoridad suprema de la Comunión Carlista". It did not endorse either any claimant or any dynasty and its manifesto stated clearly that "no tengamos Rey legitimo". The declaration pledged to safeguard Carlist spirit against mounting distortions, principally against falsifications enforced by Francoism, the system which "ha faltado esencialmente" and which was in fact not opposed but rather supported by Don Javier, who played a double game. Sivatte provided no information either on final objectives of RENACE or on its composition and modus operandi.

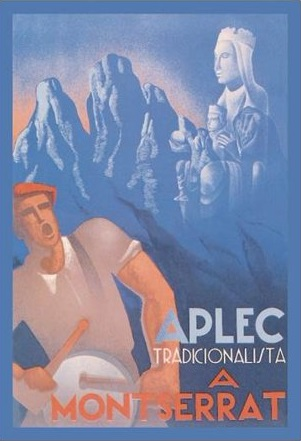
Montserrat rally poster

RENACE failed to attract considerable support among the Carlists. Its political base was reduced mostly to Catalonia, with adherence declared by some Traditionalist groupings from other regions, like Navarre, Vascongadas and Andalusia. No nationally recognized Carlist leader joined Sivatte, though some like Joaquín Baleztena voiced their support. In the early 1960s it became evident that RENACE instead of a dynamic renovating force turned out to be just another Carlist splinter faction, though its doctrinal purity and intransigence versus Francoism made it a point of reference within the Traditionalist realm. While initially Sivatte might have envisioned the initiative as a political grouping, its limited appeal rendered those ambitions irrelevant; as a result, RENACE formatted itself in-between a symbol, a pressure group and a doctrinal think-tank. Its public activity consisted of publishing the Tiempos Criticos periodical, issuing various manifestos and especially of organising public rallies, usually styled as Catholic feasts and with systematically decreasing attendance. The group did not assume a formal structure, apart from forming its Junta Suprema. Historians differ as to how Juntas de Defensa del Carlismo, local initiatives emergent across Spain in 1962–63, were related to RENACE.

== Last years ==
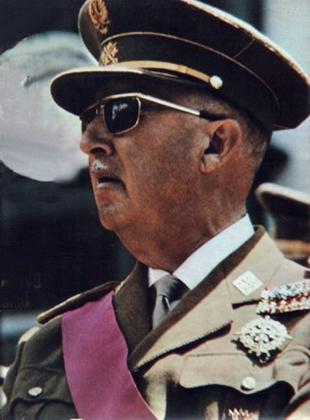
Franco, late 1960s

In the 1960s Sivatte and RENACE kept pursuing the intransigent, ultraconservative Traditionalist line. One of its fundamental threads was opposing Alfonsist restoration in general and any Carlist dynastic accord with the Juanistas in particular. Another was anti-collaborationist stand versus Francoism, increasingly unveiled and blunt as the regime was getting more and more liberal and public life was getting less and less censored. Gradually the group started to emphasize its ultraconservative Catholicism, calibrated against the spirit of Second Vatican Council and its timid Spanish incarnations, especially the so-called Law on Religious Liberties. RENACE remained also fiercely hostile towards all manifestations of liberalism, let alone more radical left-wing ideologies; one of its favorite motives was opposing "revolución mundial".

As late as 1964 Sivatte tried to maintain correct relations with Don Carlos Hugo, but the attempt backfired as significant number of Sivattistas, including Carles Feliu de Travy, left RENACE and re-integrated within Javierismo. The conversion was a serious blow to Sivatte, who made sure that the prince was a subversive leftist traitor and vehemently opposed his bid to take control of Carlism; this stand produced even sort of rapprochement between Sivatte and Fal Conde. Over time RENACE was getting more and more marginalized. Entirely failing to attract young activists, it was turning into a group of rapidly aging if not already senile dissenters. In 1970 it seemed reinvigorated when representatives of Juntas de Defensa and envoys of RENACE met in Estella to co-ordinate their activities; the meeting produced nothing but a few documents, eclipsed by what looked like impressive dynamics of the socialist-controlled Partido Carlista. In 1973, during the key annual Sivattista event, Aplec de Montserrat, only 150 participants did show up. During the same event next year Sivatte was detained and fined, perhaps the last sign of political recognition he has received in his life.

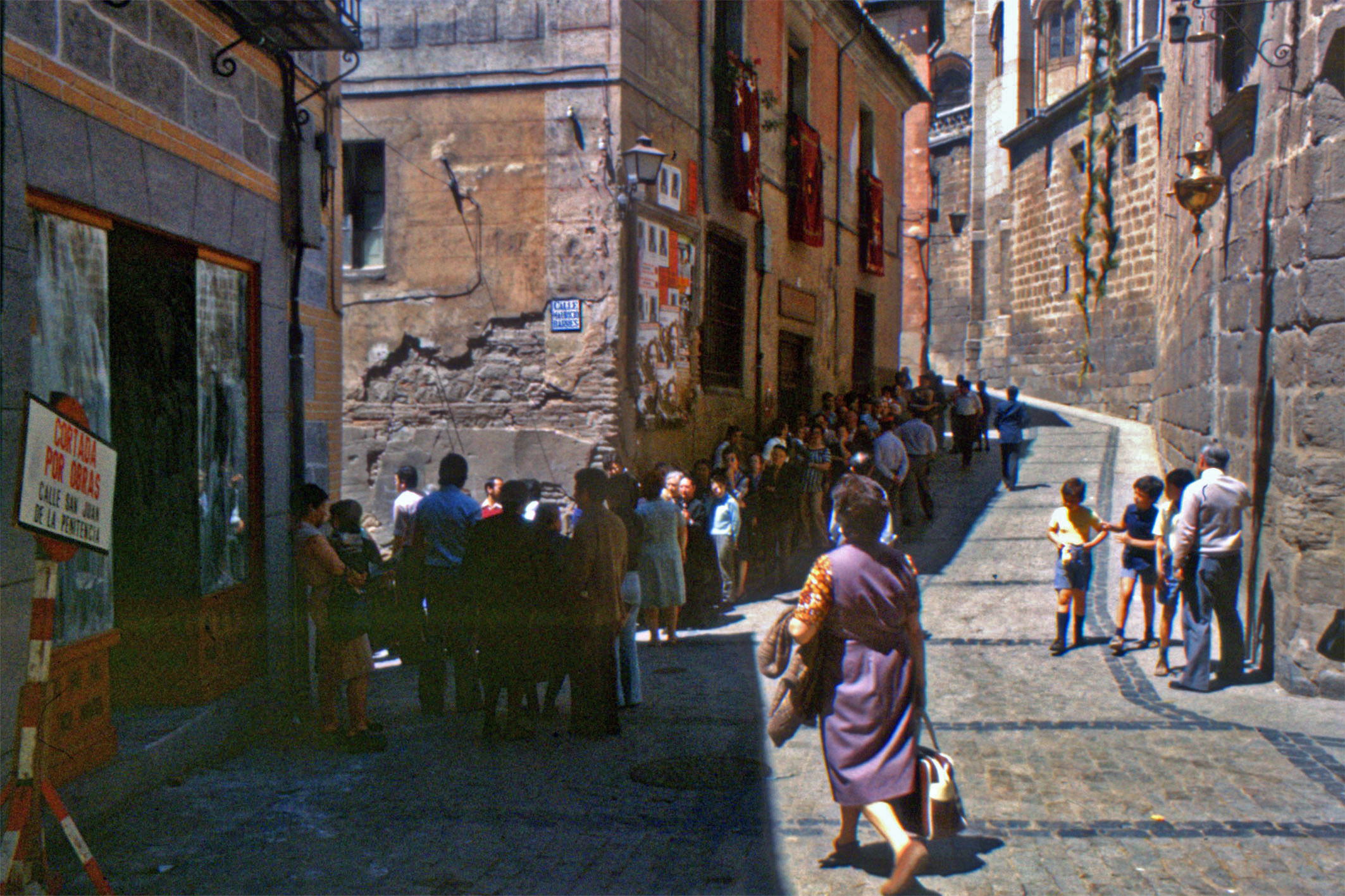
elections in Spain, 1977

Following the death of Franco and during the transición years RENACE remained firmly opposed to democratization and stood by the concept of anti-democratic, Catholic Traditionalist regime. Some authors point that the Sivattistas, always vehemently hostile to Francoism, during its dismantling paradoxically neared the post-Francoist búnker. Though in 1978 RENACE gave birth to political party named Unión Carlista, it remained a third-rate political folklore. Sivatte, by the end of his life suffering from diabetes and immobilized, until death did not miss a single Montserrat aplec.

== See also ==
- Carlism
- Francoism
- Don Javier
- Manuel Fal Conde
- Regencia Nacional y Carlista de Estella
- Monastery of Montserrat
- Terç de Requetès de la Mare de Déu de Montserrat
