= José María Sentís Simeón =

Spanish politician

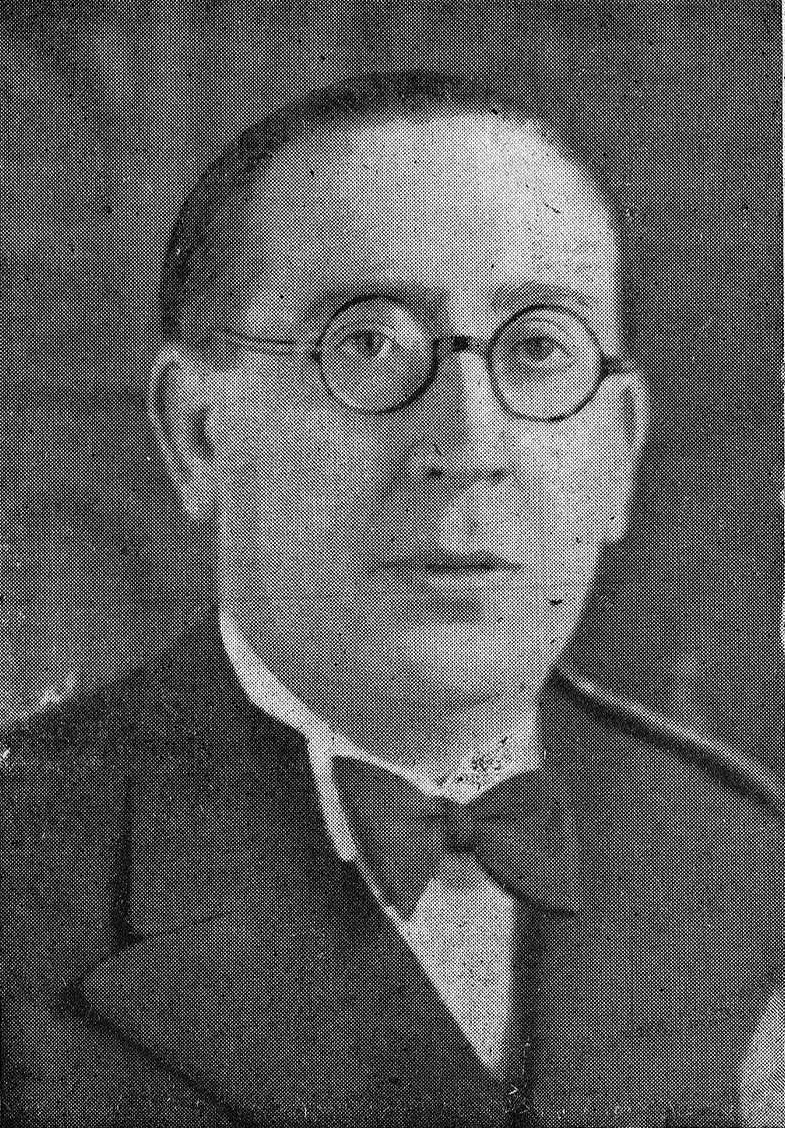
- Born: José María Sentís Simeón; 1896; Riudoms, Spain
- Died: 1989 (aged 92–93); Cambrils, Spain
- Occupation: soldier
- Known for: official
- Political party: Carlism, FET

José María Sentís Simeón (1896–1989) was a Spanish politician, official and soldier. He is best known as General Director of Prisons for 8 months in 1942–43 and as civil governor of Guadalajara and Palencia, also during the early Francoism. In 1964–67 he served as the Cortes deputy. Throughout most of his life he was an active Carlist, in 1962–65 serving as Secretario General of Comunión Tradicionalista. He retired from the army in the rank of a colonel.

== Family and youth ==
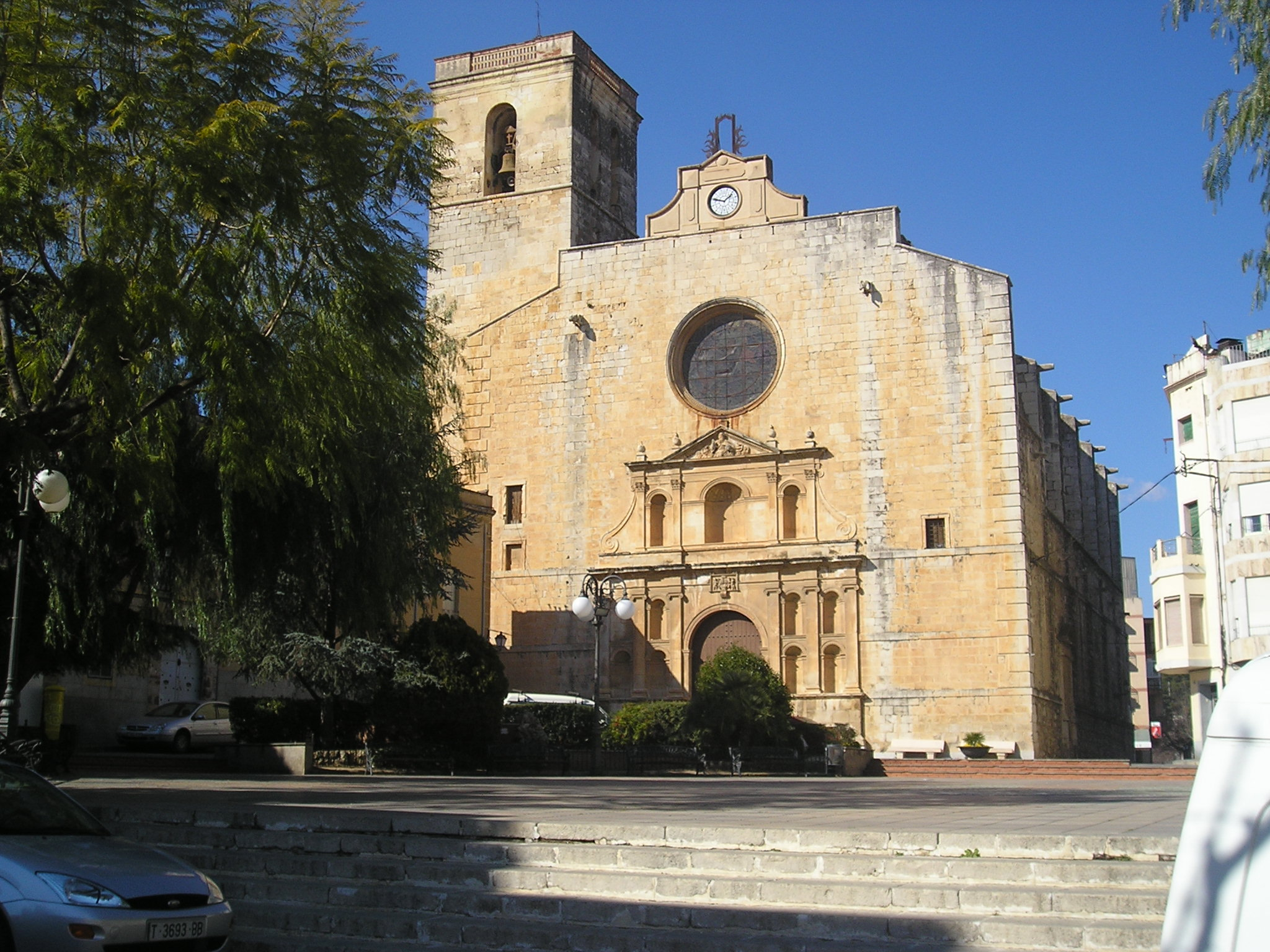
Riudoms (present view)

José María descended from a bourgeois Catalan family; his patriline ancestors for 3 generations exercised as physicians. His great-grandfather, Jaume Sentís Master, a native of Ulldemolins, in the late 18th century settled in Botarell, practicing as a surgeon. His son and José María's grandfather, Bernard Sentís Toldrà (1807–1881), moved to Riudoms. He offered not only surgery but also medical advice; the two were licensed separately and he suffered penalty measures, before in 1843 both branches were administratively united. Apart from practicing, Bernard Sentís developed interest in science. From the 1840s till the 1860s he corresponded with the Barcelona Medical Academy, his contributions based on own medical experience. Two of Bernard's sons, the older one Jaime Sentís Gran and the younger one Eusebio Sentís Gran (1853-1921) continued the family tradition, though the former as a doctor and the latter as a pharmacist. Jaime contributed to the organization of Carlists in the province of Tarragona. Eusebio, the father of José María, remained in Riudoms, where he became one of the major taxpayers.

Eusebio married Ramona Simeón Polles (1853–1919). The couple had at least 7 children, born between 1890 and 1899. The Sentís family was fervently Catholic. Another José María's paternal uncle, Caetano Sentís Gran, was vicar and canon of the Tarragona archdiocese, apart from having been a theologian and an intellectual; two of José María paternal cousins also became priests, his paternal cousin Dolores became a nun and his own sister, Dolores, joined the Carmelites. Also José María trained to be a priest; following early education in the Carmelitan college in Riudoms, he entered the Tarragona seminar. To great disappointment of his family he resigned after 6 years, opting for a military career instead. Having made up for missing curriculum in Insituto de Reus he entered Academía Militar of Barcelona, but was close to falling off due to his short-sightedness. He switched to Academia de Intendencia in Àvila, thanks to assistance of some colleagues dodging the health scrutiny. In 1920 Sentís graduated in Toledo as alferez de infantería; he was assigned to Regimiento de Almansa, which at that time was stationed in the Tarragona military district.

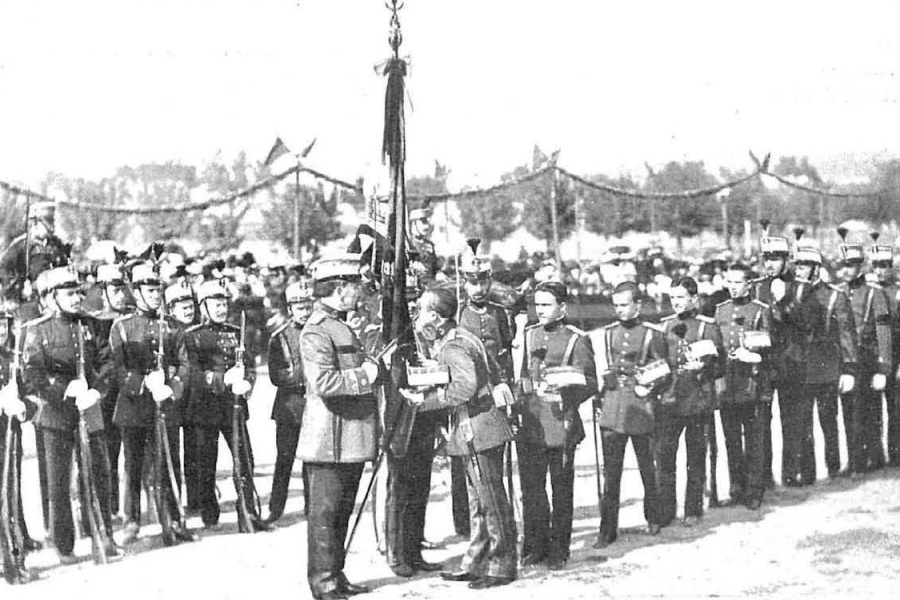
Toledo cadets taking oath, 1910s

In 1927 José María married Josefa Mariné Sancho (died 1987) from Tarragona; nothing is known about her family and herself. The couple settled in Tarragona and had two children, both of them daughters: Rosa María and María Dolores Sentís Mariné. José María outlived his older daughter; at the moment of his own death he had 6 grandchildren. None of them became a public figure. His first cousin once removed, Carlos Sentís, gained nationwide recognition as a Francoist journalist, in the late 1970s serving as Cortes deputy of UCD and acting in Catalanism, another one was vice-president of CF Barcelona in the 1960s. Son of another José María's cousin once removed is a respected Tarragona physician. The oldest brother of José María, Eusebio, in the 1920s alcalde of Riudoms, was executed by the Republicans in 1936; his sister Dolores managed to escape from the Republican zone and upon her later return to Spain has long served in education.

== Military career ==
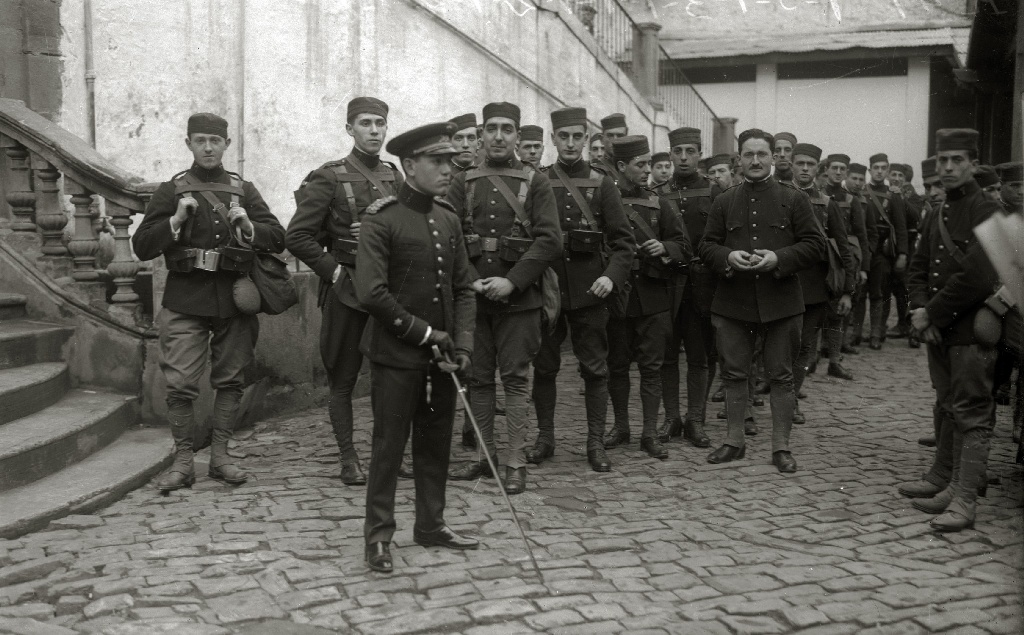
troops departing for Morocco (1922)

In 1921 Sentís volunteered to serve in Morocco, where he was assigned to Regimiento de Luchana. In his later recollections he claimed to have served 2,5 years in Africa, but as late as in 1926 he was still reported in the press as serving in the Dark Continent. He completed the colonial experience as lieutenant before returning to his Almansa regiment. Sentís spent the late 1920s on routine garrison service; in 1927 he grew to captain and assumed command of a machine-gun sub-unit. When the Republic was declared Sentís remained capitán; the new military administration did not have much trust in his loyalty, especially that he did not make a secret of his Carlist, ultra-Right outlook. By the end of 1931 he was left with no clear assignment, reduced to the status of "disponibile". It is not clear whether he was reinstated before the new 1933 Right-wing government assumed power, yet prior to 1934 he was already assigned to the 4th Somatenes Division. During the October 1934 revolutionary unrest in Catalonia Sentís commanded troops which seized the building of Tarragona Gobierno Civil, occupied by members of Esquerra Republicana and Estat Catalá, and was vital to thwarting revolutionary attempts in the province. According to one source he assumed "funciones de gobernador Civil y de Orden Público", according to another he was formally nominated the provincial Delegado de Orden Público. In late 1935 he was back with his old Regimiento de Almansa.

Since the mid-1930s Sentís together with Joaquín Bau, later to become his lifelong friend, was engaged in buildup of the Carlist organization network in the province. In 1936 the activity transformed to full-scale conspiracy, including paramilitary training of Carlist requetés and securing arms for their units. He remained engaged in negotiations with Falange and served as a link between the Carlists and the military plotters. On July 18 their plan turned into a failure; despite significant strength of local requetés in Tarragona, poor communication among the conspirators and dilatory stand of the military led to their passive, wait-and-see policy.

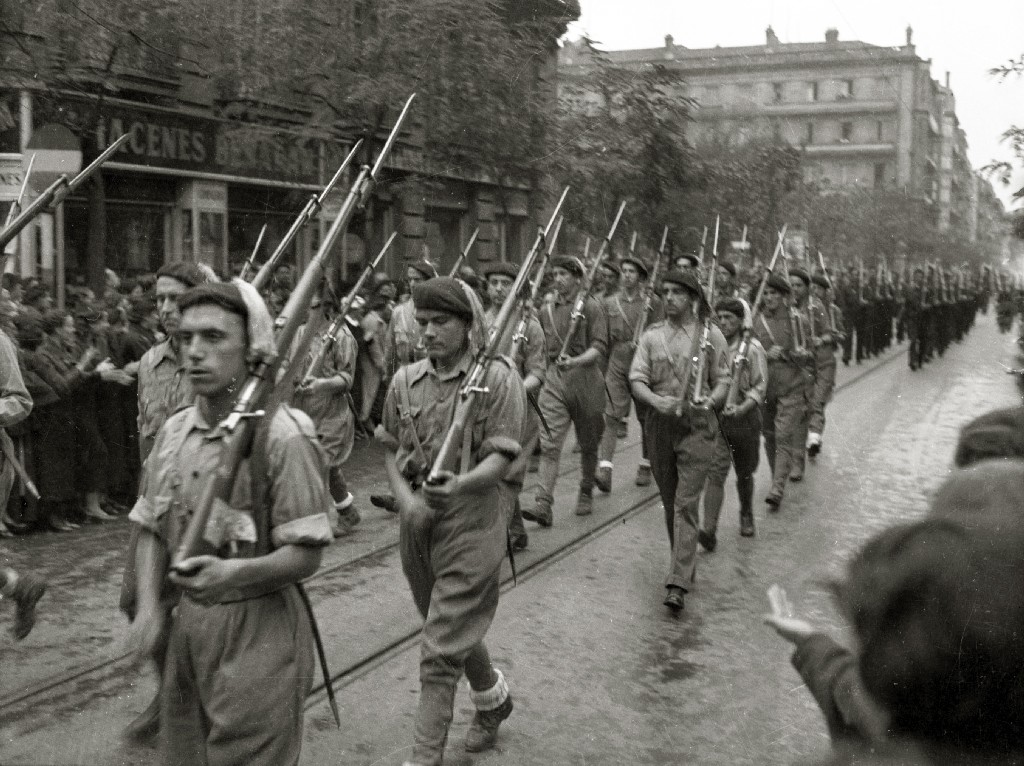
Carlist requetés (1936)

Once it became clear that in Catalonia the coup failed, Sentís first went into hiding and then having obtained false French ID papers left Barcelona on an Italian ship. From Genoa he was driven across Southern France and in August he entered the Nationalist zone in Navarre. Immediately reporting to Burgos, he was assigned to an unspecified unit, deployed on the Madrid front. It is there where Sentís got wounded twice; heavy injuries suffered due to enemy mortar fire landed him in the hospital. He spent there at least a few months before in November 1937 he was nominated commander of Tercio de Montserrat, the Catalan battalion-type requeté unit. At the time the Tercio was stationed near Zaragoza, being brought back to strength following decimation suffered during the battle of Codo; Sentís spent just 2 months heading the battalion and did not lead it in combat; in November 1937 he was reassigned to administration duties.

== Official: provincial assignments ==
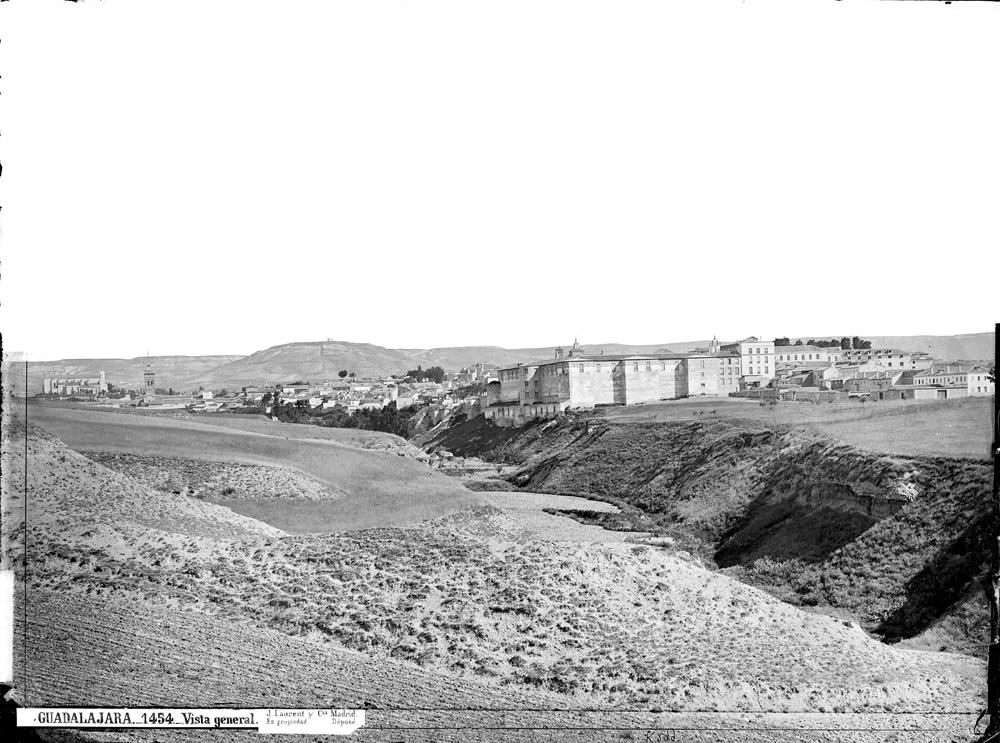
Guadalajara

Apparently fully compliant with if not enthusiastic about a Carlist-Falangist unification into a new state party, already in mid-1937 he co-drafted a scheme for personal appointments in Catalonia, to be effectuated once the region is conquered; the plan supposedly reached Franco. In December 1937, already in the rank of comandante, he was nominated Delegate for Public Order in Palencia province. According to one source the nomination came largely thanks to his good relations with Severiano Martínez Anido, freshly appointed to head quasi-ministry of Interior; according to himself, the only conditions required for appointment were being Spanish, Catholic and military. Sentís spent 6 months on the job, mostly getting back to health in the Valladolid hospital; he is noted for excellent relations with local religious hierarchy and for administering heavy fines, enforcing morality standards and especially targeting tycoons of local pre-war establishment. In June 1938 he was transferred to the same post in Navarre, where he spent 7 months; in January 1939, upon Nationalist conquest of his native Tarragona province, he returned to Riudoms.

According to one source Sentís worked to land the Tarragona civil governor job, yet in February 1939 he was nominated gobernador civil in Guadalajara; as at the time most of the province was still controlled by the Republicans, he set up headquarters in Sigüenza. His 20-month-term is marked by routine admin tasks; it is not clear to what extent he was involved in Francoist repression. His most lasting achievement was foundation of the Nueva Alcarria weekly; attempts to bring Academía de Ingenieros back to Guadalajara failed, his efforts crowned only with temporary location of the Infantry Academy in the city. Trying to enforce Carlist domination he also clashed with the local Falangist jefatura, the conflict usually centered on administration of supplies and personal composition of local comisiones gestoras. It is not clear whether political strife contributed to Sentís' departure from Guadalajara in the fall of 1940; when leaving he was nominated its hijo adoptivo.

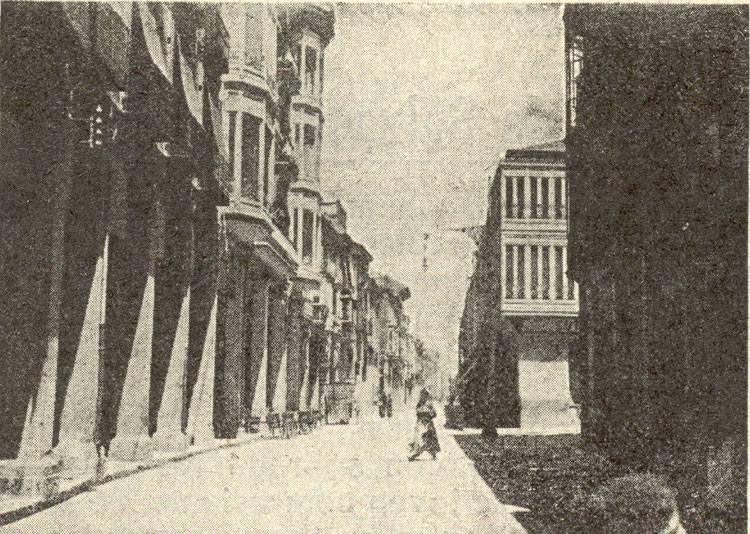
Palencia

Sentís did not seem to fall from grace with the Francoist authorities. In October 1940 he was nominated civil governor back in Palencia. He went on with the usual admin work related to supplies, prices or reconstruction, duties which at times assumed somewhat humorous shape. Political conflict with Falange immediately flared again, focused on supplies and personal policy, though it was related also to advancing Carlist symbols over the Falangist ones. Relations with the Falange Jefe Provincial turned into total disaster and Sentís was denounced as "el furibundo enemigo n° 1 de la Falange en esta capital". In early 1941 his position was still firm, as certified by personal audience with Franco, especially that his maneuvers were aimed at ensuring Carlist domination in FET, but not against the FET itself. Later on his position deteriorated, especially because as a friend of Bau he found himself in conflict with Serrano Suñer. In May 1942 Sentís ceased as civil governor.

== Official: central assignments ==
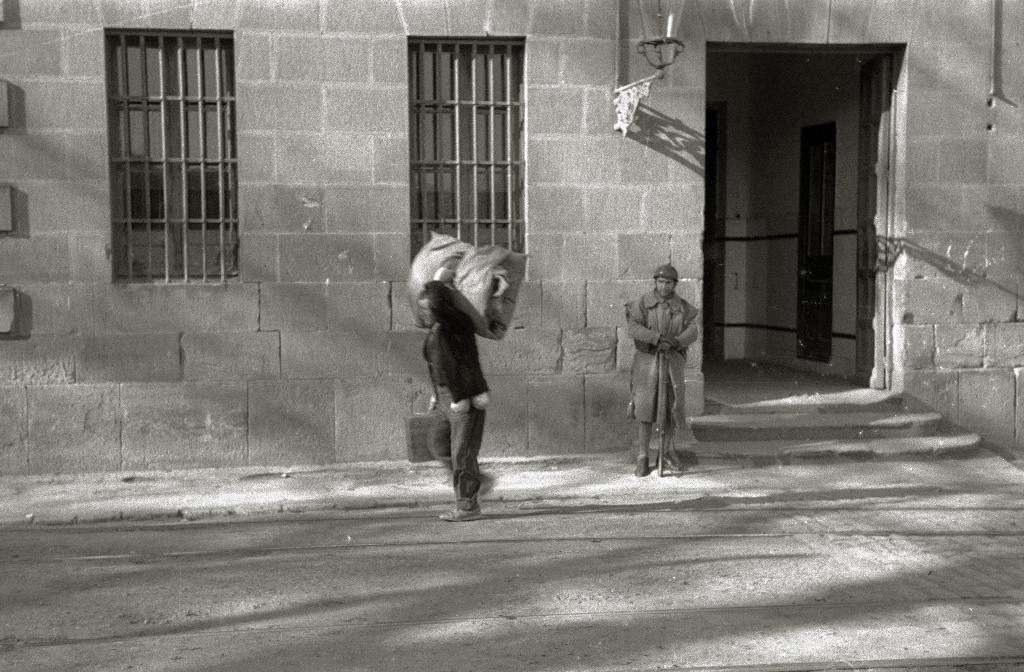
prisoner released (Donostia, 1942)

In May 1942 Sentís was appointed director técnico de Consumos y Racionamiento, a sub-unit of Comisaría de Abastecimientos y Transportes concerned primarily with managing food provisions, at the time in permanent short supply. The role proved a brief one; two months later Esteban Bilbao, the Carlist Minister of Justice, suggested he assumes the role of Director General de Prisiones. According to his later account Sentís hesitated about accepting the job but was sort of forced into it by Franco, who dismissed his doubts and ordered Bilbao to proceed with the appointment. Promoted to teniente-coronel, in parallel Sentís became also president of Comisión Permanente del Patronato Central de Redención de Penas por el Trabajo, supervising the network of Francoist labor camps. At the time the repressive nature of the system was getting somewhat diluted; the prison population kept falling from the early post-war high of 300,000 and reached 124,000 in 1942, to drop to 74,000 in 1943. None of the sources consulted provides any information on Sentís' role except that at earlier stages he demonstrated some compassion for Republican POWs. His term lasted 8 months. When Bilbao ceased as minister, the new one Eduardo Aunós brought in his own men and Sentís was released in April 1943.

1943 marked the end of major Sentís' assignments. Though at the time Serrano Suñer was ousted and the hard Falangist core was getting de-emphasized, this did not work to Sentís' advantage; he was getting gradually sidetracked. At unspecified time and still in military service, Sentís became Secretary of Supreme Council of Military Justice; apparently marginalized in terms of political career, he seemed put up with his bureaucratic role off the limelight and later appreciated the new position; in 1948 he was already coronel de infantería. In public he maintained a low profile; noted in the press usually due to his engagement in religious or ex-combatant feasts, he has never been acknowledged in relation to his military court role, usually even his military rank omitted.

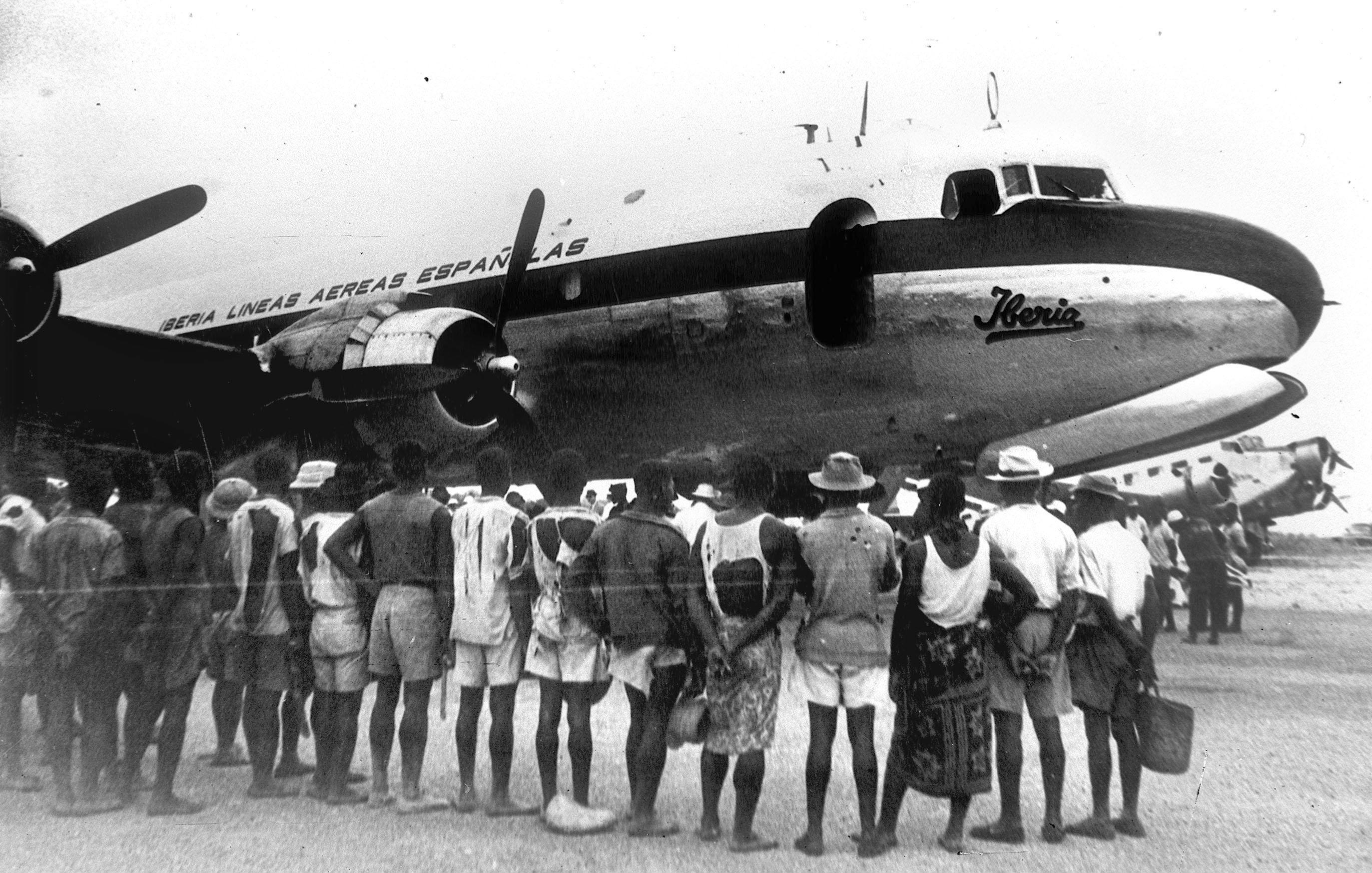
Iberia flight in Guinea, 1940s

Since mid-1940s Sentís performed managerial role in Cámaras Agricolas Pro-Guinea del Café, an organization set during early Francoism to step up exploitation of Spanish Guinea. He landed the job as a trusted man from Bilbao's network of cronies, owing the position to his short-time experience at Comisaría de Abastecimientos. The Pro-Guinea job was very advantageous financially; when it became incompatible with his military assignments, in mid-1950s Sentís preferred to ask for early retirement from the army rather than to resign his Guinea link. It is not clear whether his 1954 audience with Franco was anyhow related; the same year caudillo awarded him with Medalla de Oro of Mérito Penitenciario. In 1957 Sentís was nominated Toledo provincial delegate of Ministerio de Vivienda. He retained the job until 1961, when at the age of 65 he retired.

== Carlist: in, out and in again ==
Carlist standard

Sentís inherited political outlook from his father, who held posts in the provincial Tarragona organization. He is himself first mentioned as active in Carlism the mid-1930s. His Carlist stand during Guadalajara and Palencia assignments is well documented, even though the Tarragona Carlists viewed him as a traitor. In the aftermath of 1942 Carlist-Falangist clashes at Begoña he allegedly penned an anti-Falangist leaflet and was counted among Falcondistas, the intransigent backbone of increasingly bewildered movement. Later on his position changed and in the mid-1940s a Falangist intelligence described him as vacillating between orthodoxy and Juanismo. Indeed, in the late 1940s and early 1950s Sentís' Traditionalism seemed watered-down or reduced to private; as officer in active military service, he was hardly in position to engage in politics flavored with opposition to the regime. In 1957, already retired, he allegedly pondered upon joining the so-called Estorilos, the Carlists who recognized Don Juan as the legitimate king, but re-considered at the last minute. One source suggests that Sentís was beyond the Carlist structures altogether and claims that he re-entered them some time at the turn of the decades. If so, it is not clear whether he took active stand only after he had retired or whether it was the pro-regime turn of Carlism which prompted him into action.

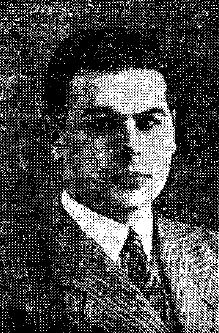
Zamanillo (earlier photo)

At unspecified time though most likely in the late 1950s Sentís engaged in labors of Comunión Tradicionalista, mainstream Carlist organization professing Don Javier as a king. The man with strong Francoist record, Sentís was welcome in the organization, at that pursuing a new collaborative policy. He soon entered Junta Nacional, the Carlist political executive, and was nominated Secretario Nacional de Organización, sort of a party minister of interior. In 1961 he started to appear publicly at clearly Carlist feasts. Hosting the Carlist political leader José María Valiente and the Carlist prince Carlos Hugo in his Madrid house or accompanying the Carlist princess Margarita in tours across Spain, he suddenly emerged among tycoons of the movement, championing the collaborative policy but also promoting a firm stand against Opus Dei, considered a pro-Juanista agency.

In the early 1960s Carlism was undergoing a very peculiar period. Apart from already somewhat abating conflict between anti-collaborationists and pro-collaborationists, a faction of young militants grouped around Carlos Hugo cautiously pursued their own agenda. Focused on social values, it was initially formatted as an offer to the Falangist syndicalist core, but later started to assume an increasingly Marxist tone. The Hugocarlistas were identified as subversive revolutionaries by the old-time requeté leader José Luis Zamanillo, and Sentís was caught in crossfire. Initially he seemed to side with the old guard; in 1962 he joined their new ex-combatant organisation, Hermandad de Antiguos Combatientes de Tercios de Requetés, and entered its Junta Nacional. However, when later that year and enraged by increasing Hugocarlista influence Zamanillo handed his resignation from the post of Secretario General, effectively position number 2 within the party structures, Sentís accepted nomination to his successor.

== Carlist: climax ==
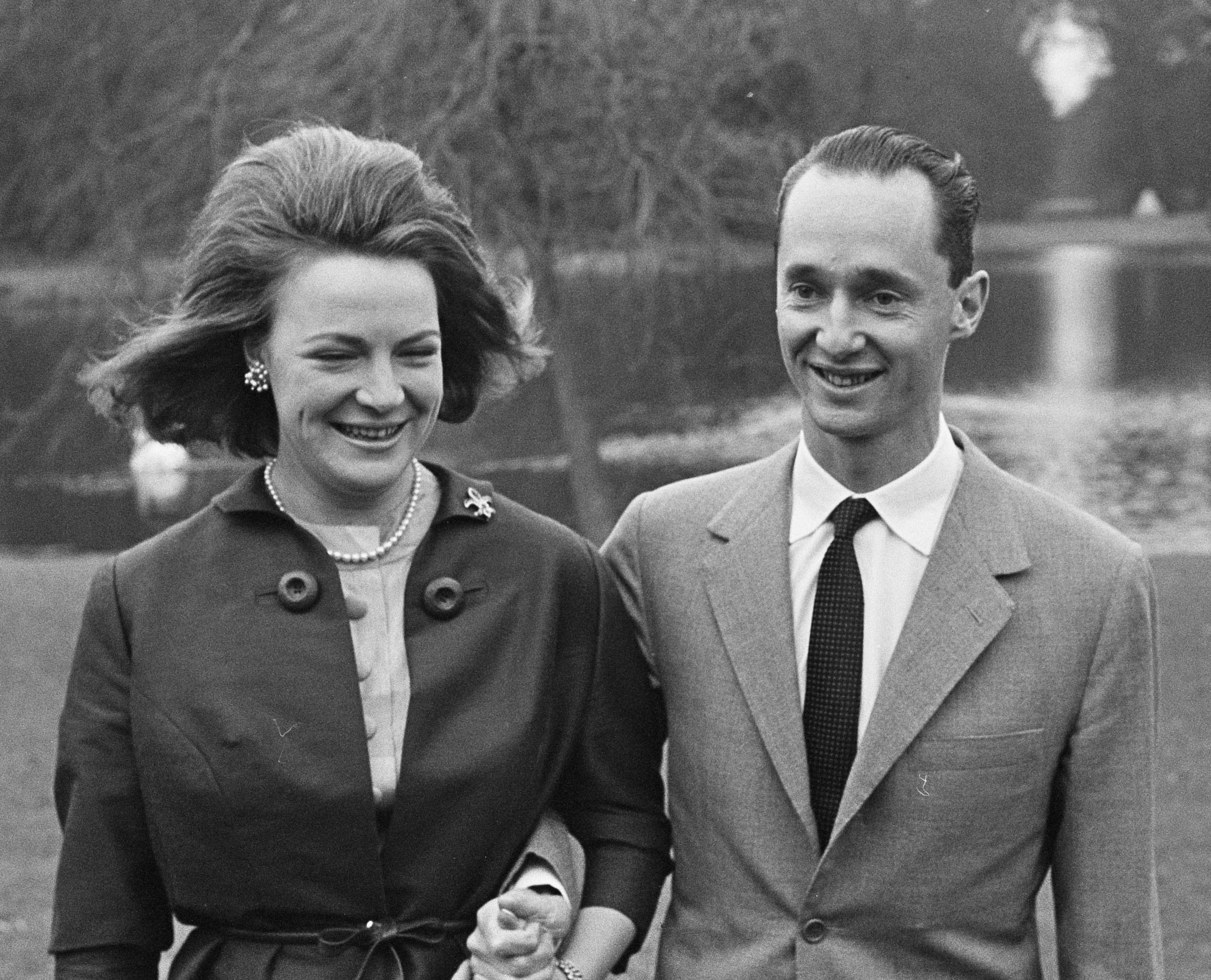
Carlos Hugo and Irene, 1964

Sentís was second only to Valiente, the Jefe Delegado. Though his role was largely technical and theoretically boiled down to co-ordinating work of Junta Nacional, it vested him also with real powers, e.g. those related to handling the party finances, especially that he entered also Comisión Especial de Estudios Económicos and planned the budget for 1963. He entered also Comisión Permanente, another coordinative body. However, the Hugocarlista strategy employed in their bid for control in the organization relied on constant structural changes, with new bodies being created in order to dilute power. A new scheme, effective since 1963, confirmed Sentís as general secretary but tended to relegate Traditionalists to prestigious position of little power and put followers of the prince on key behind-the-stage jobs.

Sentís did not seem aware of the ongoing power struggle. Naturally conservative, he negotiated return of the Siempre group. Loyal to Don Javier he served as a link between him and the increasingly marginalized Zamanillo, though he also denounced the latter suspecting him of secret talks about dynastic reconciliation with the Juanistas; the affair contributed to final expulsion of Zamanillo. The Hugocarlistas considered Sentís a rotten reactionary and "lugarteniente de Valiente", but they needed him to credit their strategy of courting Franco and as a person with links to the regime, especially as Carlos Sentís was at the time the manager of EFE, much needed in Hugocarlista media strategy. Indeed, in 1964 Sentís contributed to public image campaigns promoting Carlos Hugo and his wife Irene, inadvertently strengthening the Hugocarlistas at the expense of Valiente and the Traditionalists. During informal talks with the head of Falange Solís the Hugocarlistas suggested that Sentís be appointed to the Cortes; indeed in 1964 he was nominated member of Consejo Nacional del Movimiento, which ensured a 3-year-term in the parliament.

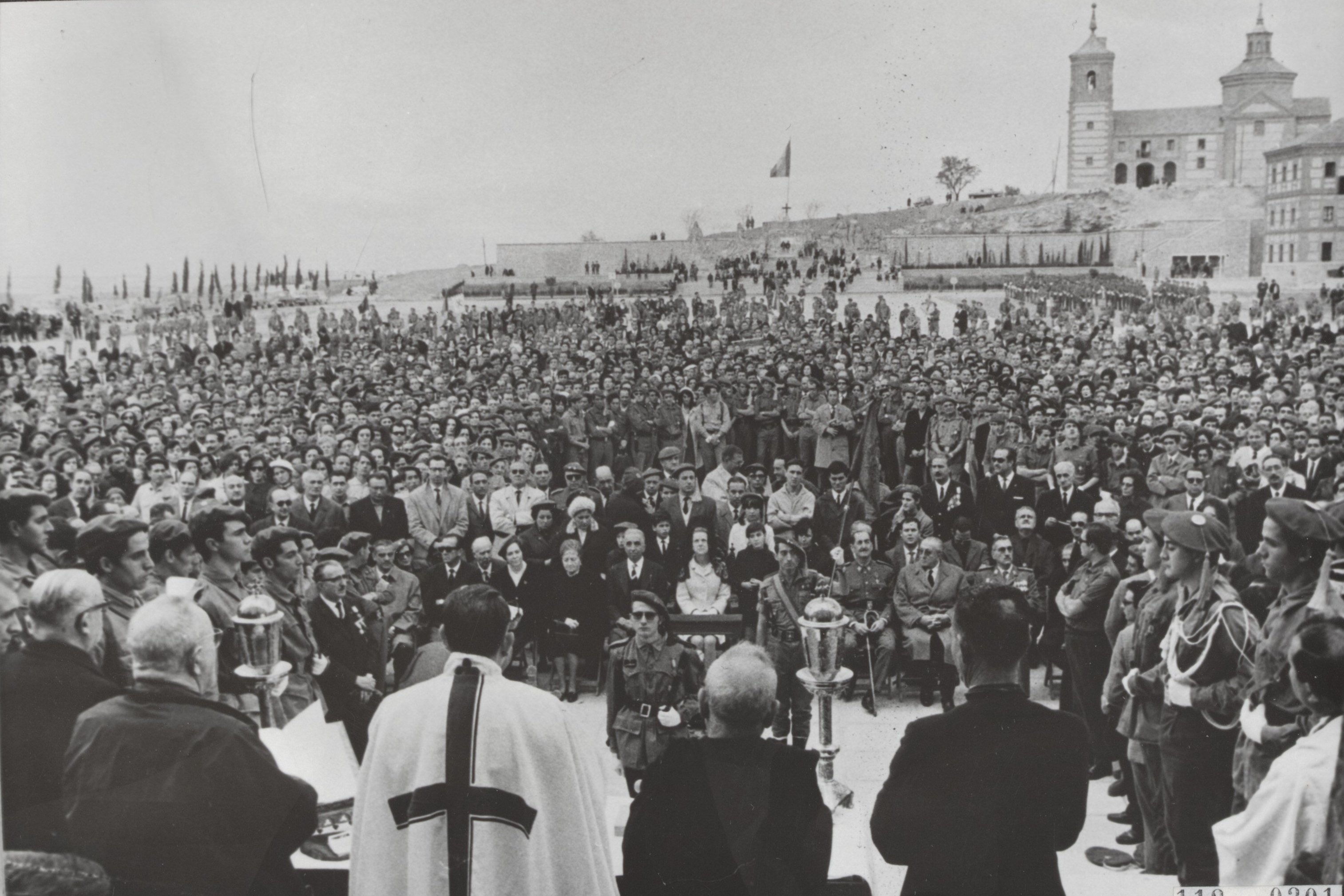
Carlist gathering, Cerro de Los Ángeles near Madrid, mid-1960s

The year of 1964 marked the climax of Sentís' role in the party. Later that year chief architects of Hugocarlista bid were replaced with new, even more radical leaders, who decided to abandon the initial caution and launch an open progressist campaign. Though Valiente and Sentís were dubbed "jefes nacionales carlistas", in fact it was Carlos Hugo and his entourage who were pulling the strings; they considered the time ripe for purging the party executive from the Traditionalists. Riding another wave of structural remodeling, in 1965 they abolished the role of Secretary General altogether. Dismissal was disguised as sort of an honorary retirement and Sentís was invited to take part in the meeting of Carlist jefes with Don Javier in Puchheim. The claimant addressed Sentís with an effusive letter, thanking him for great contribution and vaguely suggesting the need to make room for the young; this was also the line advanced by the Hugocarlistas themselves. As Sentís remained a rather passive member of the executive his ousting did not come as a big surprise and initially generated little controversy within the organization. Hugocarlistas were cautious to burn his entire correspondence and change the office door locks.

== Carlist: demise ==
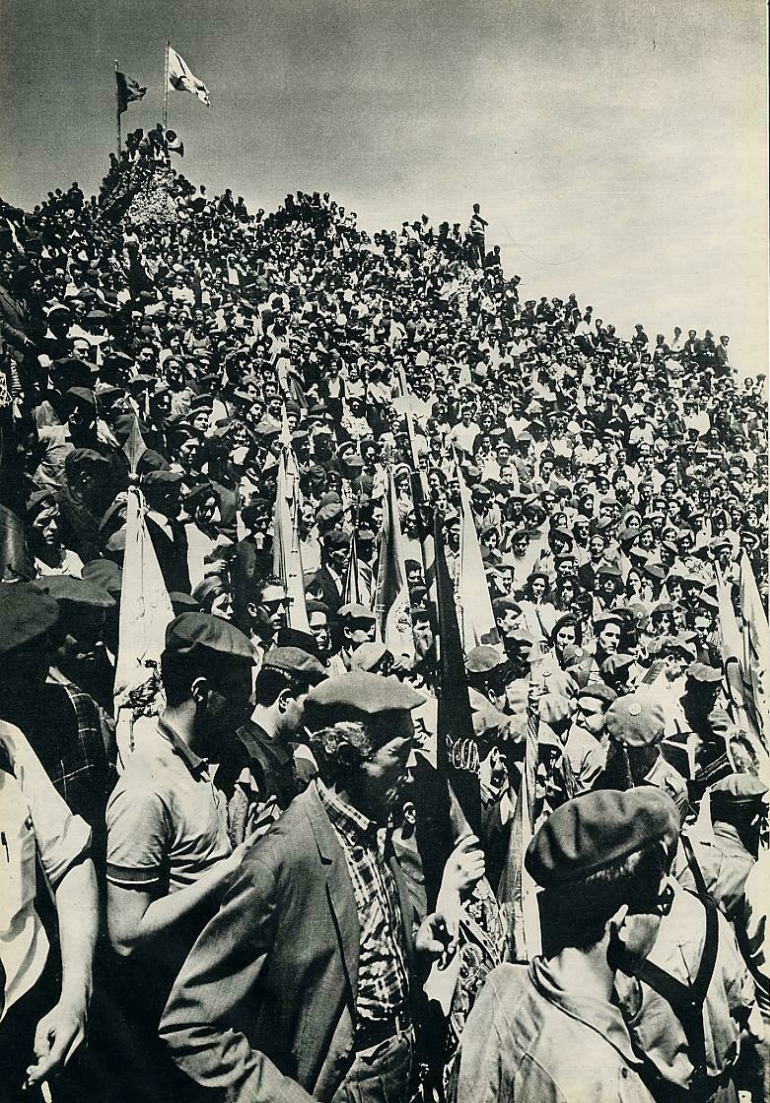
Montejurra, 1966

In 1966 the governing structures of Comunión were already purged of the Traditionalists and José María Valiente remained virtually isolated in command layer, dominated by the Hugocarlistas. At this point the rank-and-file resistance against the new progressist course was already mounting. It is not clear whether Sentís, who had just turned 70, realized that he fell victim to the ongoing struggle between the Traditionalists and the Progressists. In 1966 he accepted a post in Consejo Asesor de la Jefatura Delegada, another new body within the organisation. The 36-member council gathered mostly Carlist old-timers and theorists; providing them with prestigious role, it was in fact intended to camouflage the Hugocarlista grip on the organization.

In the public realm Sentís was enjoying the status of a noble veteran; apart from receiving other honors, in 1966 Franco conferred upon him Grand Cruz del Mérito Civil and related homages were organized accordingly in Riudoms. However, when his Cortes term expired in 1967 it was not prolonged; deprived of his deputy mandate and not holding any posts within the regime, Sentís was no longer needed by the Progressists within Comunión Tradicionalista. There is no information on his activity in the party in the late 1960s and he probably slipped into idleness, his prevailing political strategy since the 1940s. In 1970 he moved permanently from Madrid to Tarragona. Unlike some other Traditionalists he did not abandon the organization, turned into militantly left-wing Partido Carlista. In 1971, upon reorganization of the regional Catalan Partido Carlista junta, he became its honorary president; oddly enough, at the same time he was in public proudly confirming his unconditional adhesion to Franco.

In 1972 Sentís seemed already beyond Partido Carlista. He might have been involved in attempts to launch a competitive Carlist organisation based on requeté ex-combatant structures and some even suggested that he becomes its jefe, yet it is not confirmed that the project was agreed with him. In the mid-1970 he limited himself to cultivating his Guadalajara link - featured especially in the weekly he co-founded, Nueva Alcarria - and to supporting financially educational, cultural and religious initiatives in Riudoms. Shortly before turning 90 he noted in a press interview that "les guerres em semblen una barbaritat i sobretot les civils", declared himself a Catalanist and expressed sympathy for Jordi Pujol and Miquel Roca.

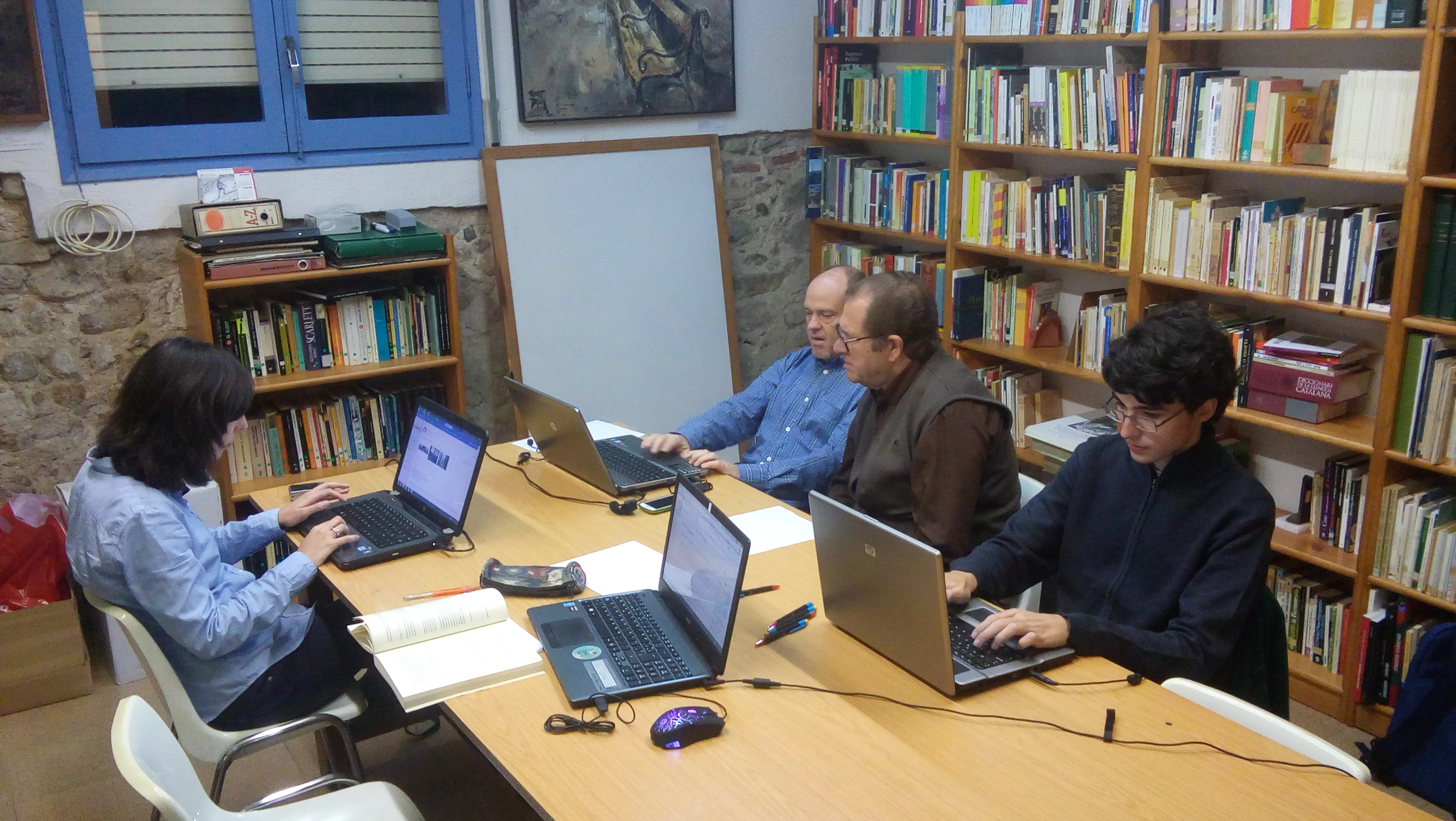
Riudoms educational facility

In 1997 the Riudoms ayuntamiento declared Sentís "fill il·lustre" of the town, quoting his contribution to construction of schools and reconstruction of churches in Riudoms and the Baix Camp county; a long street running across the town was also named after him. In 2011 Esquerra Republicana councillors demanded that the decision is reversed; they claimed that the nomination was incompatible with Ley de la Memoria Histórica and that as head of prisons, Sentís was responsible for brutal Francoist repression. Since then various organizations and individuals keep reiterating the claim, alternatively denouncing Sentís as Fascist or ridiculing him as "caudillo de Riudoms por la gracia de Dios" and "hijo ilustre franquista".

== See also ==
- Carlism
- Carlo-francoism
- Terc de Requetes de la Mare de Deu de Montserrat
