= CD Chozas de Canales =

Defunct association football club based in Spain

Chozas de Canales
- Full name: Club Deportivo Chozas de Canales
- Founded: 2006; 2023 (refounded)
- Ground: Viso Arena, Chozas de Canales, Castile-La Mancha, Spain
- Capacity: 1,000
- President: Ángel Luis Castillo
- Manager: José Carlos Fernández Ferreira
- League: Segunda Autonómica – Group 5
- 2024–25: Segunda Autonómica – Group 5, 10th of 15
Home colours	Away colours

Club Deportivo Chozas de Canales is a football team based in Chozas de Canales, Castile-La Mancha, Spain. Founded in 2005 and refounded in 2023, they play in Segunda Autonómica – Group 5. The club's home ground is Viso Arena.

Before 2011–12 season, Chozas de Canales was expelled of Primera Autonómica Preferente due to numerous irregularities. The club returned to an active status in 2023.

== Season to season ==
Season	Tier	Division	Place	Copa del Rey
2006–07	6	2ª Aut.	5th	
2007–08	6	1ª Aut.	2nd	
2008–09	5	Aut. Pref.	4th	
2009–10	5	Aut. Pref.	1st	
2010–11	4	3ª	18th	
2011–2023	DNP			
2023–24	7	2ª Aut.	8th	
2024–25	7	2ª Aut.	10th	
2025–26	7	2ª Aut.		

- 1 season in Tercera División
