= Patricia Chozas y Chozas =

Mexican politician (born 1974)

- Born: 8 October 1974 (age 51); Durango, Mexico
- Occupation: Politician
- Political party: PVEM

Olga Patricia Chozas y Chozas (born 8 October 1974) is a Mexican politician from the Ecologist Green Party of Mexico. She has served as Deputy of the LVIII and LX Legislatures of the Mexican Congress representing Durango.
