= Chozas de Abajo =

Chozas de Abajo, Spain
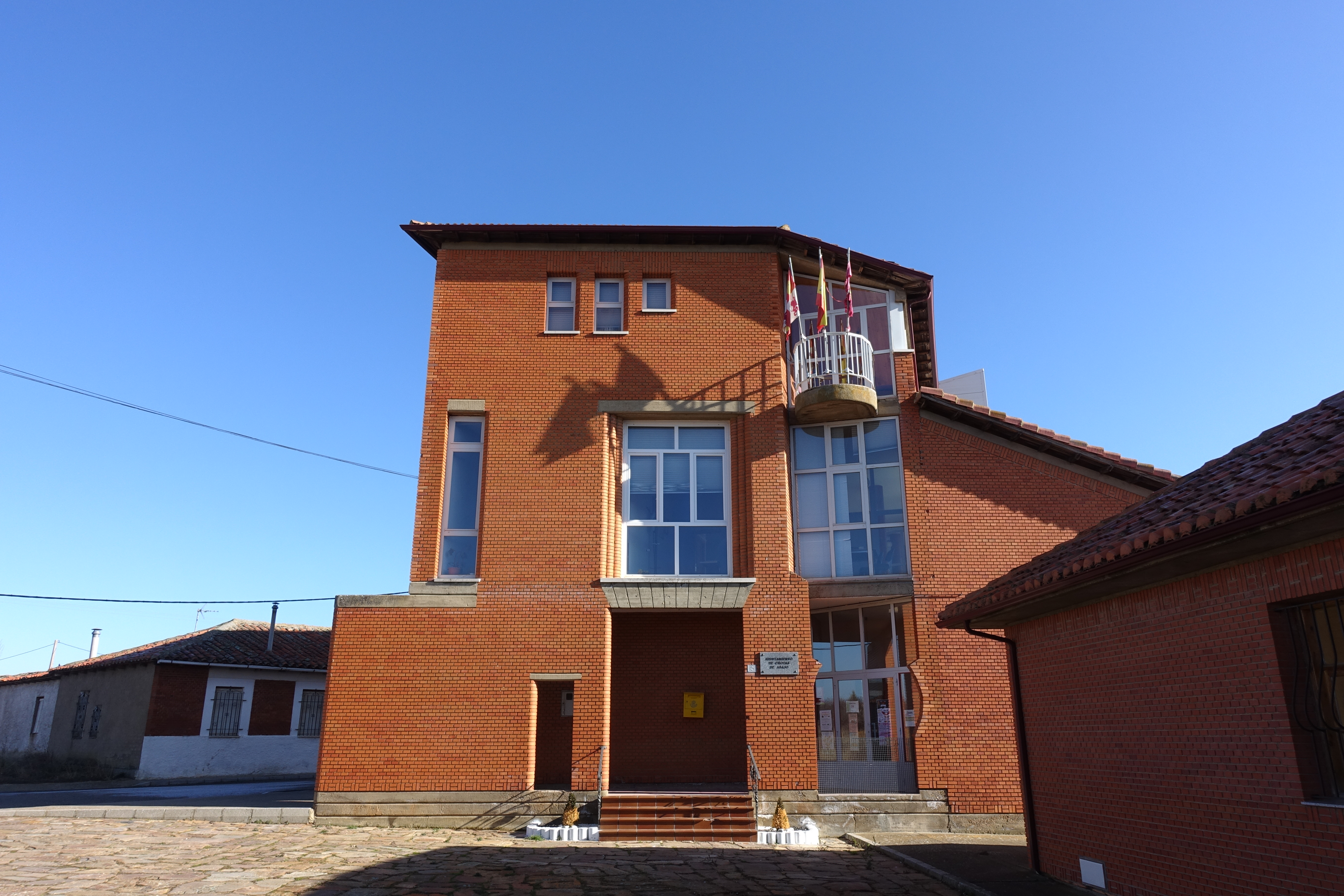
- Town hall

- Coat of arms

- Location within Spain
- Coordinates: 42°30′26″N 5°41′11″W
- Country: Spain
- Autonomous community: Castile and León
- Province: León
- Municipality: Chozas de Abajo

Government
  - Mayor: Roberto López Luna (PP)

Area
  - Total: 100.27 km^{2} (38.71 sq mi)
- Elevation: 879 m (2,884 ft)

Population (2025-01-01)
  - Total: 2,699
  - Density: 26.92/km^{2} (69.72/sq mi)
- Time zone: UTC+1 (CET)
  - Summer (DST): UTC+2 (CEST)
- Postal Code: 24392
- Telephone prefix: 987
- Website: Ayto. de Chozas de Abajo

Chozas de Abajo (Spanish pronunciation: [ˈtʃoθas ðe aˈβaxo]) is a municipality located in the province of León, Castile and León, Spain. According to the 2010 census (INE), the municipality has a population of 2,424 inhabitants.
