= Chozas de Canales =

- Municipality
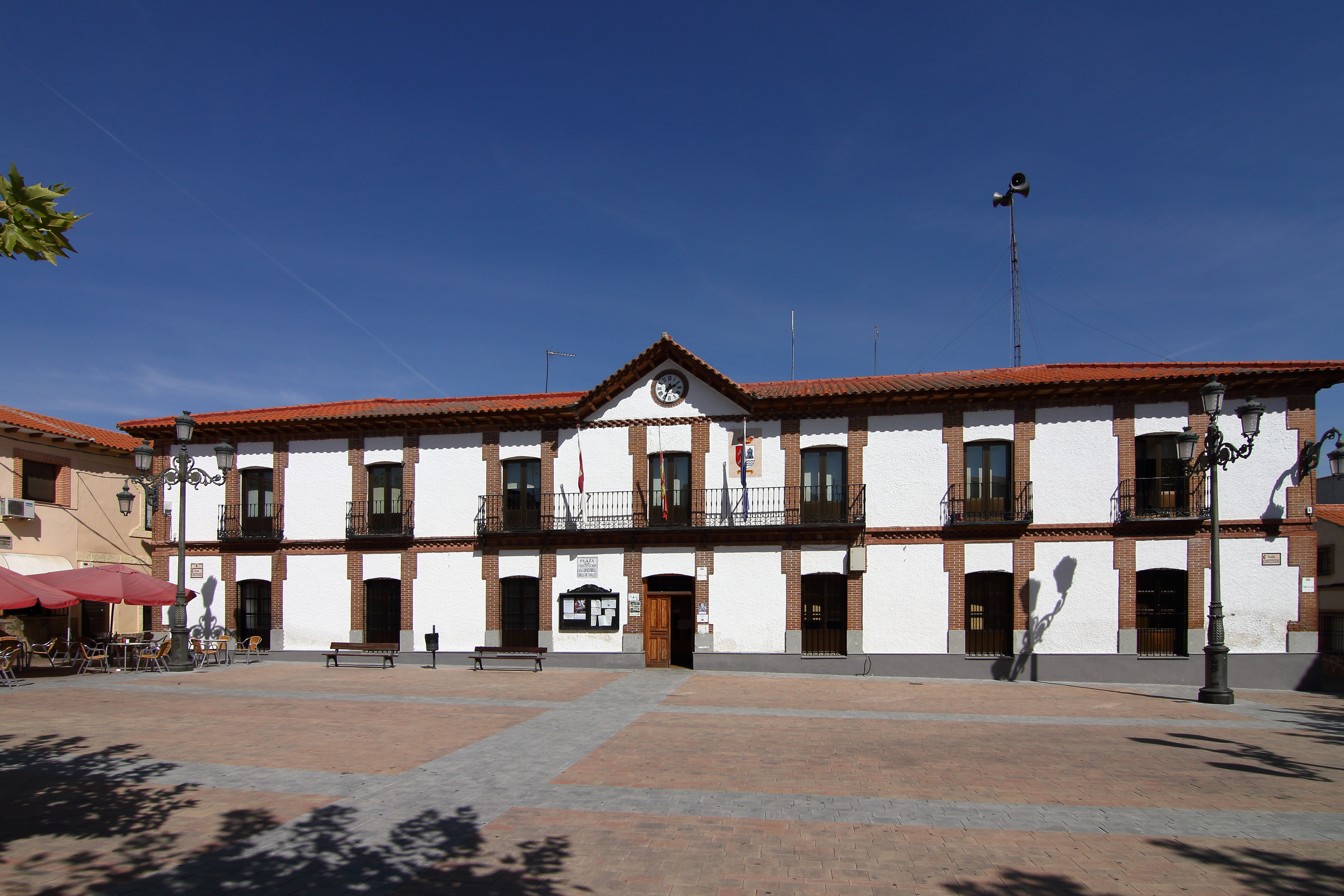
- Town Hall

- Coat of arms

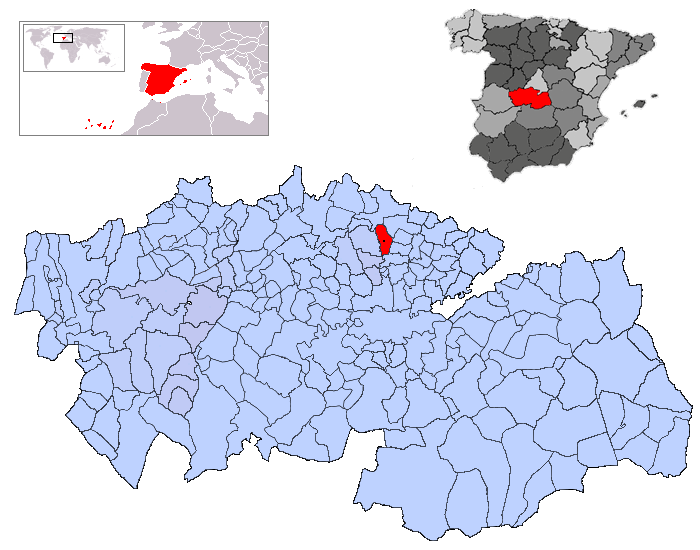

- Location in Spain
- Coordinates: 40°5′54″N 4°2′34″W
- Country: Spain
- Autonomous community: Castile-La Mancha
- Province: Toledo
- Comarca: La Sagra
- Judicial district: Illescas
- Founded: Ver texto

Government
  - Alcalde: Julián Agudo Santos(2007)

Area
  - Total: 33 km^{2} (13 sq mi)
- Elevation: 557 m (1,827 ft)

Population (2025-01-01)
  - Total: 5,044
  - Density: 150/km^{2} (400/sq mi)
- Demonym(s): Chocero, ra
- Time zone: UTC+1 (CET)
  - Summer (DST): UTC+2 (CEST)
- Postal code: 45960
- Dialing code: 91

Chozas de Canales is a small farming village and municipality in the province of Toledo, part of the autonomous community of Castile-La Mancha, Spain. With improved road links from the national capital Madrid to the north, the village has doubled in size (1995–2005), with new chalets being built. The village now has a supermarket and a restaurant that opens in the evenings. But the old part of the village still has a feeling of going back in time with the good community spirit. The new chalets are essentially identical and modern and do not blend in with the old traditional village houses. The village centre still maintains its charm and tradition, but the new part looks like a giant council estate.

The village is built around the small chapel in the centre opposite the village square and with the church on the hill looking down. People in the village either commute to Madrid for work or are involved in farming. The village produces its own wine, Rocanales, from the Bodega Cooperativa Santa Maria Magdalena. Around the village is miles upon miles of farm land.

== History ==
The Secretary of State of Philip IV, Don Pedro Coloma and Escolano, bought for himself and his successors the territories that included the uninhabited portion of Canales and Regachuelo, with the villages of Chozas and Yunclillos. Already with the title of marquis, he was granted the status of viscount of Chozas de Canales, in 1680. With these and other inherited lands, or foreclosed mortgages when he did not have them by inheritance, he ended up with the "cabildo de racioneros beneficiados y curas" of Santa Maria, the village of Navarrete, in the Rioja, and the bishopric of Calahorra and La Calzada. But by 1770, the family had no heirs, and the lands reverted to the cabildo. At the end of the 18th century, the marquesal palace was restored.

== Demographics ==
Historical population
Year	Pop.	±%
1900	979	—
1910	1,144	+16.9%
1920	1,237	+8.1%
1930	1,324	+7.0%
1940	1,307	−1.3%
1950	1,462	+11.9%
1960	1,402	−4.1%
1970	1,056	−24.7%
1981	902	−14.6%
1991	897	−0.6%
2001	1,078	+20.2%
2011	3,988	+269.9%
2021	4,335	+8.7%
2023	4,751	+9.6%
Source: INE

== Public Holidays ==
- Name of Holiday: CHRISTMAS - Cabalgata, mass. Date: 5 of Jan, Duration: One day
- Name of Holiday: CRISTO DE LA MISERICORDIA - Procession, Arts & Music, Infant Party, Date: last weekend in May, including the Friday, Duration: Four days
- Name of Holiday: STA. Mª MAGDALENA - Procession and mass, Date: 22 of July, Duration: Three days
