= José María Cunill Postius =

Spanish-Catalan entrepreneur and Carlist

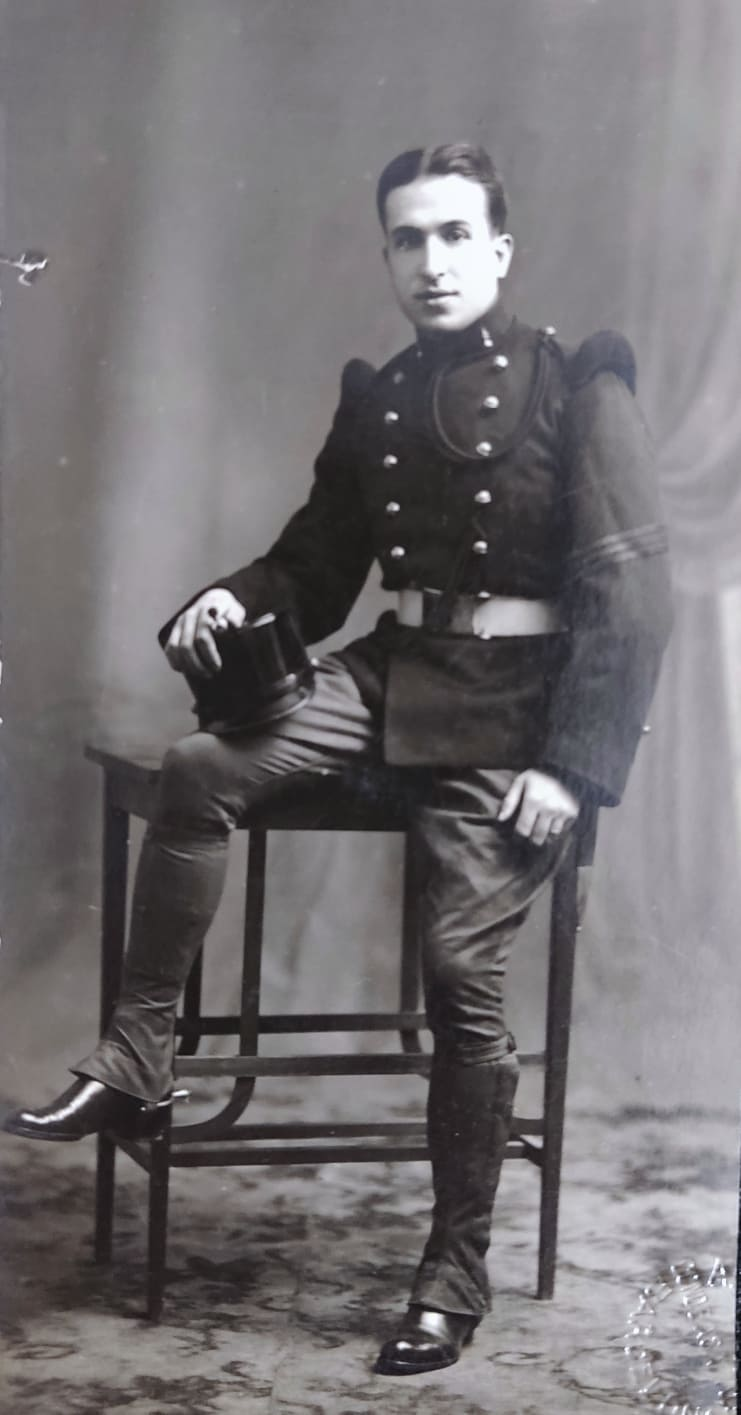
- Born: José María Cunill Postius; 10 July 1896; Berga, Catalonia, Spain
- Died: 27 November 1949 (aged 53); Terrassa, Catalonia, Spain
- Occupation: entrepreneur
- Known for: paramilitary commander
- Political party: Carlism

José María Cunill Postius (10 July 1896 – 27 November 1949), Catalan: Josep Maria Cunill i Postius, was a Spanish Catalan entrepreneur. Politically active within Carlism, he is known mostly as commander of the regional branch of the Carlist paramilitary organization, Requeté; he was also among key civilians engaged in the anti-Republican conspiracy and the 1936 coup in Catalonia. He vehemently opposed unification into the state party Falange Española Tradicionalista and after the civil war he remained engaged in conspiracy against the Franco regime.

== Family and youth ==
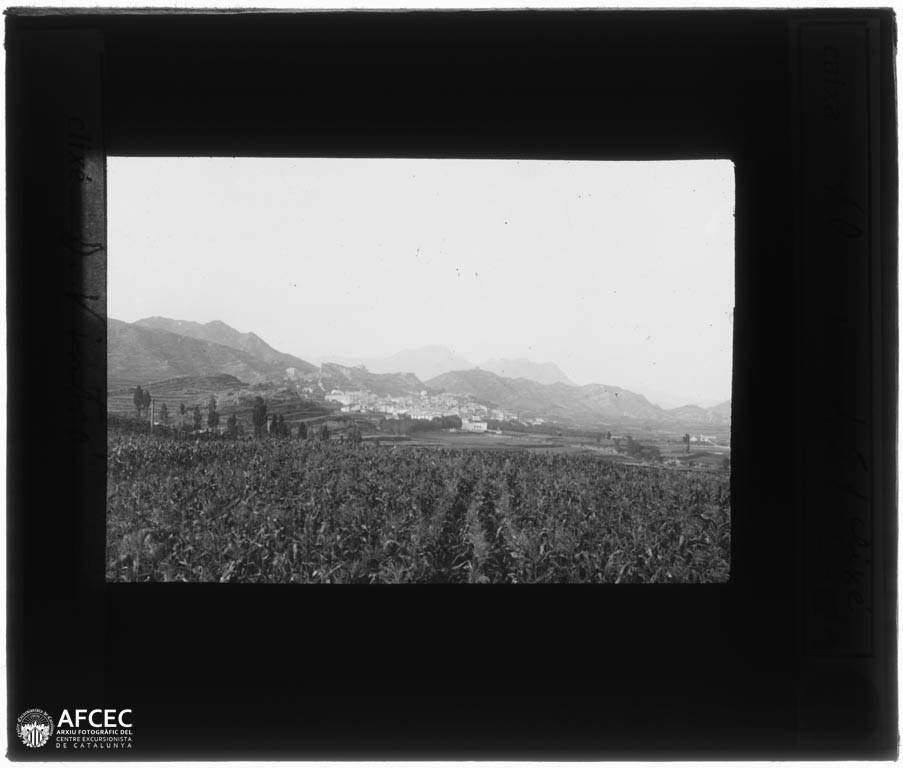
Berga, 1907

The family of Conill/Cunill is among the oldest ones in Catalonia, noted since the medieval times. Over time it got moderately branched, mostly in the provinces of Barcelona, Girona and in the Baleares. It is not clear which branch the ancestors of Cunill Postius were related to. The most distant of his forefathers identified is a paternal grandfather, José Cunill Traserra; in the 1870s he was referred to as “conocido industrial” in the city of Berga, already at the Pyrenean foothills. His son Victoriano Cunill Pujol (1860-1925) was also an entrepreneur. In the late 19th century he operated a mid-size textile plant Lluis Nè, and then purchased another one, called cal Patata; in the 1920s the integrated business consisted of some 38 machines. Cunill Pujol was also president of Sindicato Patronal de Sastrería de Berga and Sociedad de Maestros Sastres.

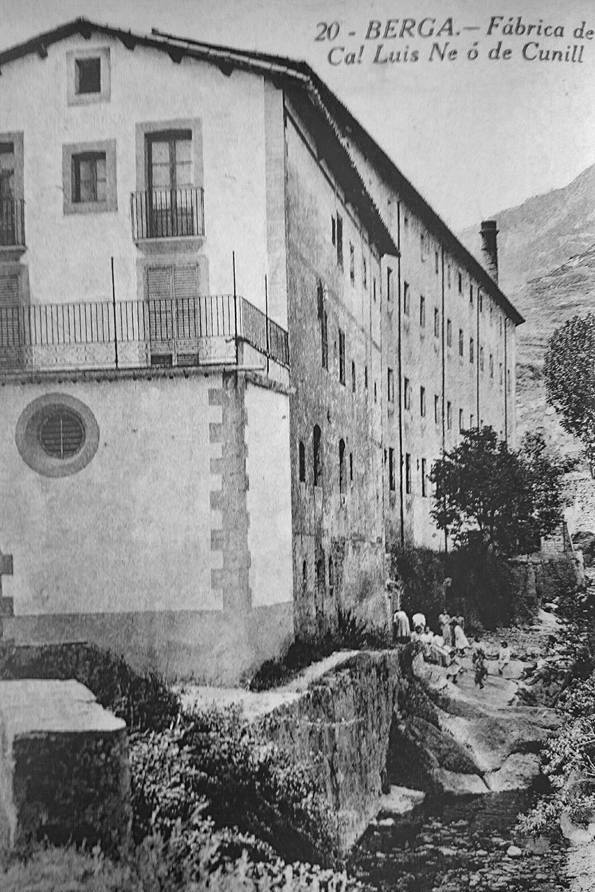
Cunill textile plant, Berga, around 1915

In 1883 Cunill Pujol married Rosa Postius Sala (1864-1929); she was daughter to Jaime Postius Vilardaga, a merchant from Berga. The couple had 3 children, born between 1886 and 1899; José María was born as the younger son and second oldest child. There is nothing known about his early childhood, except that the family was very pious; the brother of Rosa, Juan Postius Sala, entered the Claretian order, served on overseas missions, and was personal friend to Federico Tedeschini and Eugenio Pacelli. In the 1910s the young José María frequented Escuela Superior de Comercio in Barcelona and obtained the title of contador mercantil; it is not clear whether he pursued an academic career afterwards. He engaged in the family business and following military service at the turn of the decades, in the early 1920s he remained busy upgrading the Berga textile plant.

At unspecified time but in 1928 latest Cunill Postius married Mercedes Solá Brujas (1907-1993); she descended from an established family from Matadepera near Terrassa, which since medieval times owned large plots in the area. The couple settled at the bride's estate and since 1928 Cunill is noted as related to agricultural business in Terrassa, propietario and l’industrial terrasenc. They had 8 children. The oldest one, José María Cunill Solá, became a Catholic priest and served on apostolic missions overseas; he propagated liberation theology, embraced socialism and was co-founder of Comité Oscar Romero and Asociación de Amics del Bisbe Casaldàliga. Another son, Antonio Cunill Solá, as a deacon remained active in Bandera Roja and served in the Terrassa council as the representative of PSUC. Cunill Postius’ grandson Francesc Dalmases Cunill was a well-known mountain climber.

== Towards Catalan requeté command ==
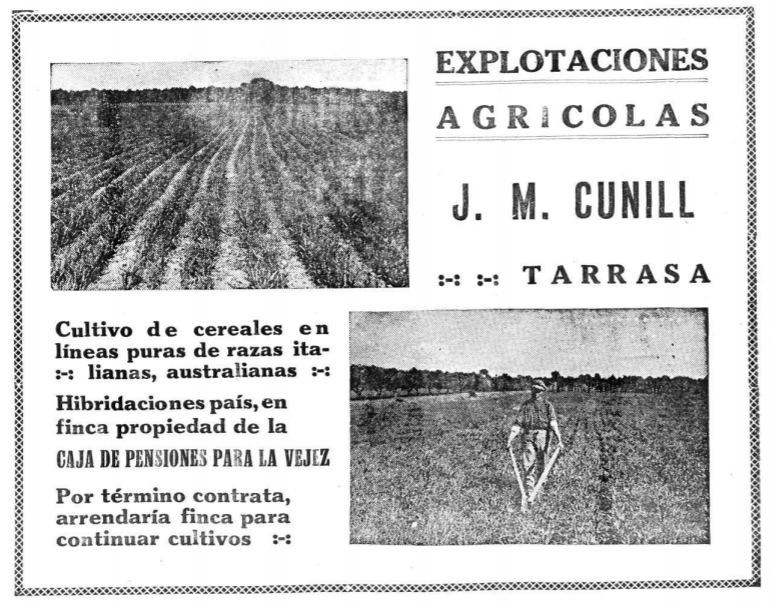
Cunill's press commercial

In the 1920s Cunill remained engaged in his agricultural Terrassa business, which at some point involved even international trading in grain. By the end of the decade he suffered a series of accidents: in 1928 his Granja de Productos Agrícolas warehouse in Terrassa was consumed by fire, in 1929 his warehouse at Rambla de Egara was robbed, and in 1930 there was another robbery and minor damage recorded. It is not clear whether these were accidental misfortunes or rather the mark of growing social tension. Cunill animated Sindicato Agrícola de Terrassa and in 1930 as its representative he entered junta directiva of Unión de Sindicatos y Agricultores de Cataluña, where he became the vice-president. Except for agricultural syndicates, there is no information either on his public activity at the time or on political stand adopted during dictadura and dictablanda.

Following declaration of the Republic in 1931 Cunill was involved in Peña Ibérica, a Barcelona association which originated as a sports group and which gradually assumed a right-wing political flavor. Its members - Carlists, Alfonsists, supporters of PNE – might have been involved in loose conspiracy against the regime. What political current Cunill was associated with at the time is unclear; there is neither any information on political preferences in his family. However, in 1932 he was for the first time recorded as related to Carlism. During elections to the newly established Catalan parliament he appeared as Traditionalist on the list of Dreta de Catalunya in the Barcelona province district. The alliance performed badly, trailing behind Esquerra (65,300), Lliga (36,980), Partit Catalanista Republicá (21,654) and Partit Republicá Radical (19,025); with 5,903 votes Dreta failed to win a single mandate.

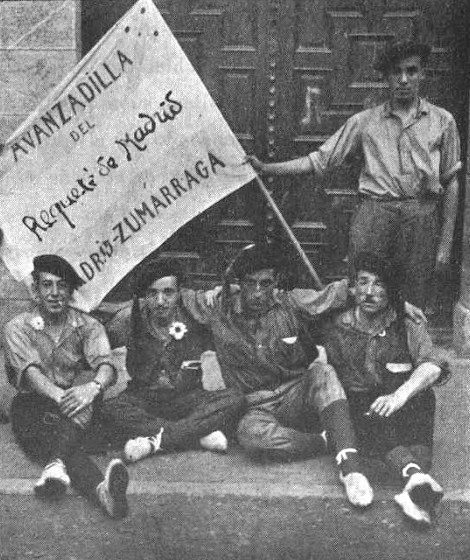
requetés on tourist trail

In the early 1930s Cunill was engaged in buildup of the local Terrassa branch of the Carlist paramilitary organization, Requeté. Uniformed members of the unit took part in public religious events, held guard in front of churches or convents, engaged in leafleting and assembled own rallies. Though the organization was short of massive, Cunill-led detachments amounting up to 50 members commenced trainings and drills in the countryside. Until 1933 the Terrassa branch emerged as the best-organized local requeté section in Catalonia. Cunill himself was recognized as supporter of firm anti-Republican measures, “partidario de pasar a la acción”. As such, he opposed the moderate line advocated by the Catalan Carlist leader, Miguel Junyent. In mid-1933 the Catalan Carlist hardliners, including Cunill, Conde de Valdellano and the Marcet brothers, mounted an offensive against Junyent; they travelled to Saint-Jean-de-Luz to speak with the claimant Alfonso Carlos and met the nationwide requeté leader, José Luis Zamanillo. Some scholars claim the coup was animated by local Integrists. Eventually Junyent decided to step down, replaced by Lorenzo Alier Cassi. Cunill was nominated head of requeté in the entire Catalonia.

== Conspiracy ==
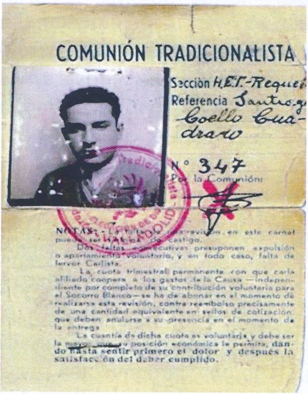
requeté ID card (sample)

As head of Catalan requeté Cunill embarked on major shake-up of the paramilitary, carried out in line with general re-organisation enforced centrally. Already in 1933 representatives of the Catalan branch took part in national rally in the Cantabrian Potes; throughout 1934 Cunill implemented new hierarchical structure and command chain, introduced strict discipline, issued ID cards and commenced regular tactical drills in the countryside. In 1934 some 15 Catalan requetés attended a training in Fascist Italy. Cunill was eager to maintain some separate identity of the Catalan branch, be it in terms of organisation or uniforms, though this did not lead to major problems. His role in buildup of the Catalan requeté is compared to this of Antonio Lizarza in Navarre.

During the 1933 elections the detachments were deployed guarding sites of right-wing parties or newspapers and at one opportunity engaged in shootout with the Escamots. During the October 1934 unrest Cunill remained in touch with the local UME; he pledged 500 men ready to confront the revolution, though it is not clear whether there were indeed any requetés engaged in action along the military. At the time he was already member of the Terrassa ayuntamiento, elected back in January, and co-owner of a local Terrassa daily Crónica Social, which he co-purchased one year earlier. Though one of key men of Catalan Carlism he was barely engaged in nationwide politics, and his taking part in consultations with Fal Conde on would-be entry into the National Bloc was rather an exceptional episode.

In 1935 Cunill represented the requeté organization in España Club, an informal Barcelona extreme-right inter-party platform related to UME. Its leaders tried to form own shock units, named Voluntariado Español; each unit was supposed to retain its political identity and the Carlists seemed the largest and the best-equipped group. It is not clear whether the nationwide requeté command was aware and approved of this scheme. Resolved to confront a forthcoming revolution, they were prepared to practice urban combat by staging assaults on a masonic centre in Terrassa and an Anarchist one in Figueres. The Voluntariado scheme was abandoned following the elections of February 1936; military conspirators decided to talk to each political grouping separately.

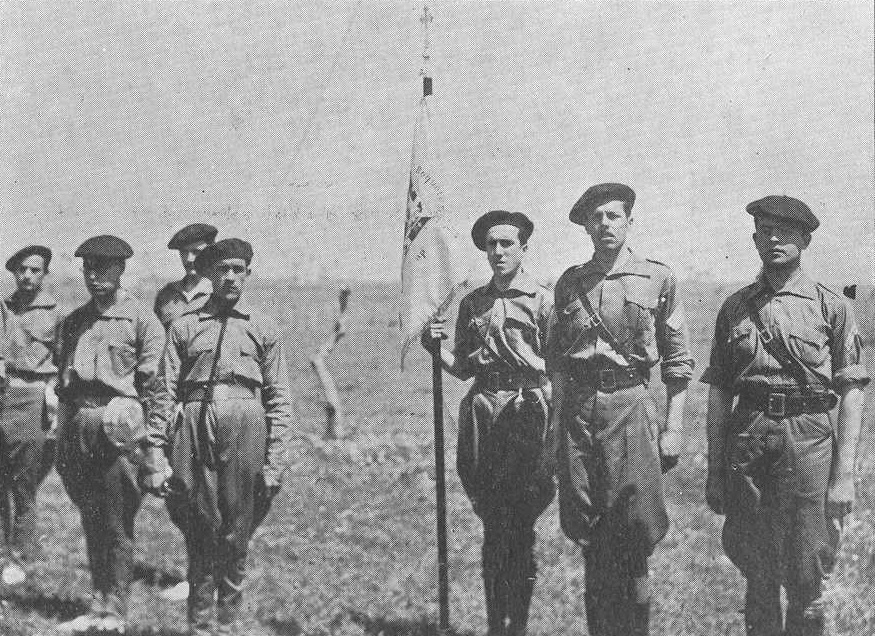
requeté drill, 1934 (sample)

Since the triumph of Frente Popular Cunill was determined to mount a pre-emptive strike against the Republic. Initially he devised a local plan of action based on provocation; requetés were supposed to stage a series of sabotages disguised as revolutionary work, and pre-agreed army crackdown on Left-wing organizations was to follow. Though local Falange opted out, the date has been tentatively agreed with UME and requetés were put on highest alert awaiting a command from the military; eventually it did not come. Despite this setback Cunill remained fully committed to action and kept maintaining close links with the conspirators from UME. It is not clear what his relation with the new Carlist Catalan leader Tomás Cayla was; the latter remained rather skeptical about a violent anti-republican coup.

== Civil war ==
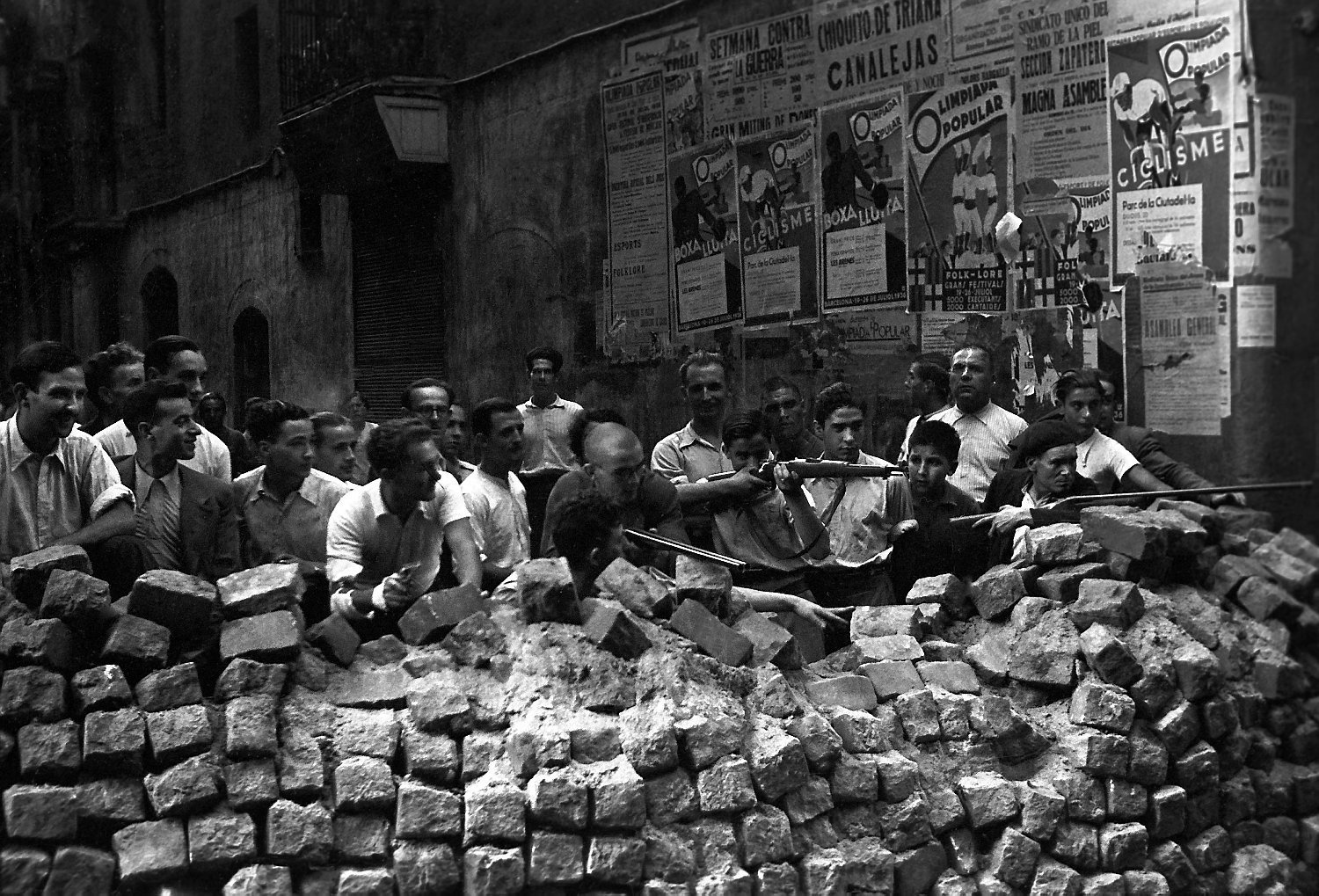
Barcelona, July 19, 1936

Cunill was among key civilians engaged in Catalan anti-Republican conspiracy of the spring of 1936; he was also closely in touch with the nationwide Carlist command. He offered to the Barcelona military some 3,000 action-ready requetés and further 15,000 as auxiliaries; in return he received general instructions. How many volunteers indeed reported to the barracks on July 19 is unclear. Cunill led a group of some 200 men who appeared at the San Andrés quarters; some scholars claim the campaign was poorly organized. Following a chaotic day which involved some shootout, San Andrés was seized by the loyalists and Cunill was apprehended. Either the next or the following day he and other captured requetés were led to the Montcada y Reixac cemetery and shot. Cunill managed to fake death; lightly wounded, he survived also coup de grâce. Treated later by friends, he left Barcelona and in August 1936 in unclear circumstances he made it to the rebel zone.

Cunill was among the very first requetés who reached the Nationalist lines following the failed coup in Catalonia. Once he was joined by some other Carlist survivors, especially the political second-in-command, Mauricio de Sivatte, the two commenced labors to group incoming refugees into a Catalan-only Carlist combat battalion. It materialized in late 1936 as Tercio de Nuestra Señora de Montserrat, and took part in combat until the end of the war. Cunill did not join frontline units and remained engaged in the rear. In December 1936 he entered Comisión Carlista de Asuntos para Cataluña; the internal Carlist 6-member body was busy mostly with logistics and organization of Catalan Carlists. At later stages Comisión was re-organized and replaced with Jefatura Regional. However, Cunill tried to thwart similar designs on part of competing organizations. In early 1937 he and others protested to military authorities against formation of Jefatura Territorial de Cataluña de F.E. de las J.O.N.S.

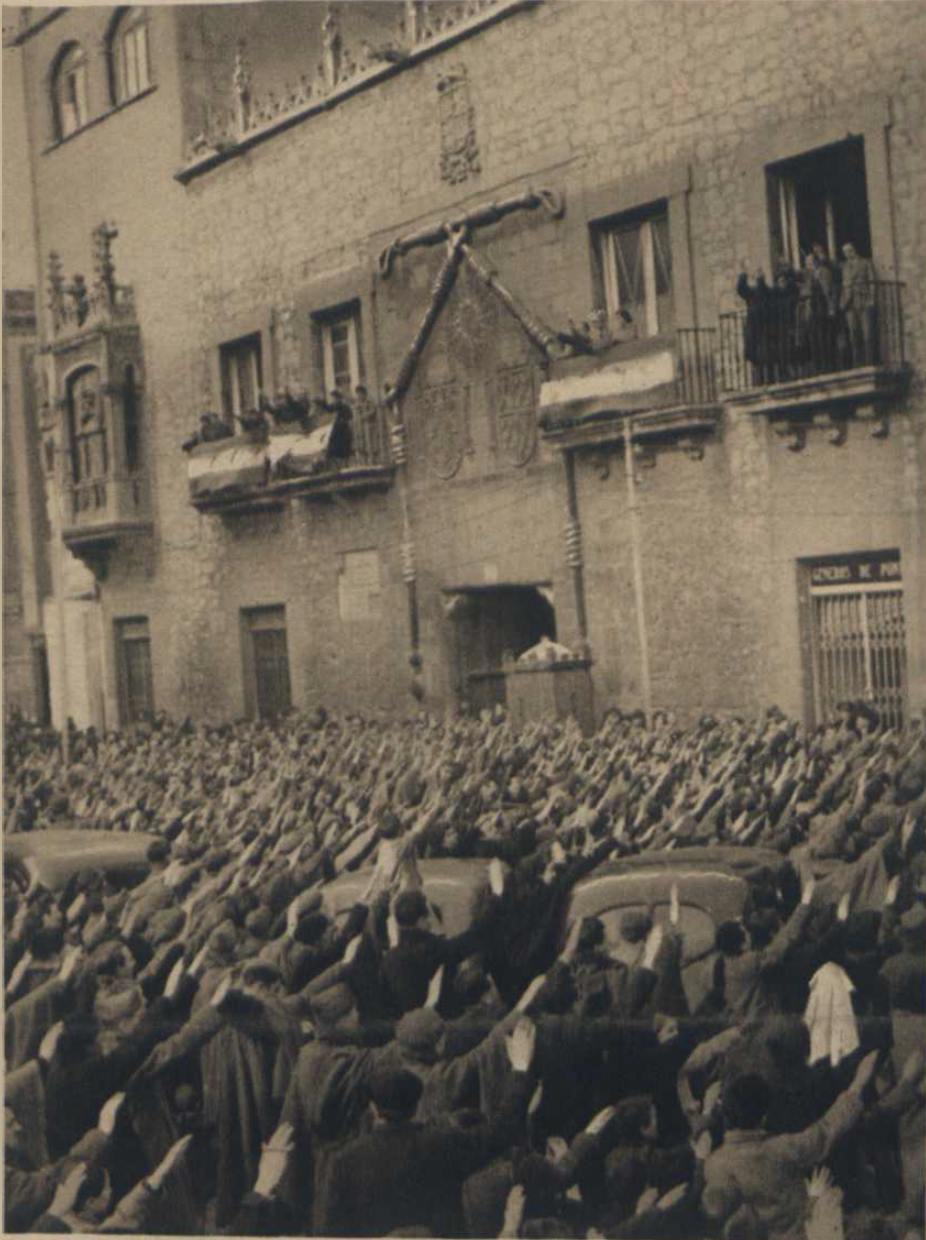
Barcelona, January 28, 1939

Cunill was not among the Carlist heavyweights and he did not participate in key party meetings about the threat of forthcoming amalgamation into a state party. However, it is known that he remained among the most staunch opponents of the project, and that following the Unification Decree of April 1937 he refused to engage in structures of the emerging Falange Española Tradicionalista. His fate throughout 1938 is not known. In January 1939 he and other leading Catalan Carlists – like Sivatte or Vives – accompanied the Nationalist troops entering Barcelona. They immediately engaged in organization work and kept re-opening Carlist círculos in the city; the plan was to ignore unified FET structures and return to status quo ante. However, the strategy failed; within few days the Francoist military governor of Catalonia ordered all círculos to close.

== Francoism ==
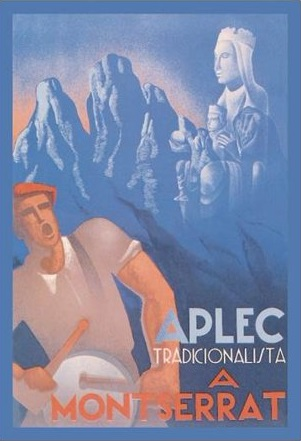
Montserrat rally poster

Despite the ban on non-licensed political activity Cunill engaged in buildup of semi-clandestine Carlist structures and attempted to use religious and official events as cover when advancing Traditionalist propaganda. During preparations to anniversary of the July 1936 rising in Barcelona, in July 1939 he was detained by security and placed in home arrest for 2 weeks. A later police report claimed that he organized a requeté unit named “Tercio de Nuestra Señora de Tecla”; reportedly it was busy with anti-Franco street graffiti and geared up to violent action. In 1940 an informant of security services agonized about “dangerous freedom of action” enjoyed by Sivatte and Cunill, who “promueven disturbios, editan hojas clandestinas, etc”. The same year Sivatte and Cunill organized a separate, non-official Martires de la Tradición rally; security report noted uniformed requeté detachments seen on the streets, all co-ordinated by “cabecillas antiunionistas Sivatte, Cunill y Gassio”. In 1941 strict orders were issued by the administration to prevent any such cases.

In the early 1940s Cunill and Sivatte tried to mount some local political schemes and get Traditionalists installed in municipal authorities, e.g. in Badalona. In Terrassa with moderate success and together with the Marcet Cabassa brothers Cunill attempted to build sort of a political and cultural bulwark against Francoism. It was partially disguised as a club named – again - Peña Ibérica; the FET report claimed it was “un gran estorbo para la unificación” and that local rank-and-file Traditionalists were “víctimas de la actuación de sus directivos”. Among other charges, the Falangists claimed that Cunill was co-responsible for intimidation of Barcelona bookstore owners, told to remove books of Primo de Rivera and Franco. Potentially the most explosive incident took place in 1943, following Carlist-Falangist skirmishes during the Montserrat rally. Cunill and Francisco Vivés Suriá – pistols in hand - stormed Falangist premises to free captured Carlists; as there were none, no shootout followed.

Carlist standard

Since the mid-1940s the Navarrese Carlists tried to lure Cunill into their schemes, intended against what was perceived as appeasement policy of Fal Conde towards the Franco regime; his stand is not clear. It is known that later Cunill was getting increasingly frustrated by Fal and in a personal letter to Don Javier of early 1948 he complained about lack of bold, anti-Francoist, Traditionalist course. The claimant asked him to have full trust in the Carlist command, but also dismissed him from the post of Catalan requeté leader, the move immediately protested by Sivatte. In 1949 Cunill was already at the verge of loyalty to Don Javier: in February he asked a local Valencian leader Sara Peris to re-format party propaganda and focus on loyalty to the defunct Alfonso Carlos, in April he openly voiced against Fal and his Junta Regional, and in November he signed the last letter to Don Javier, pressing him to terminate regency and declare himself the king. At the time Cunill was at the terminal stage of cancer and he died some two weeks later.

== See also ==
- Carlism
- Traditionalism (Spain)
- Maurici de Sivatte i de Bobadilla
