= Joaquín Bau Nolla =

Spanish politician (1897–1973)

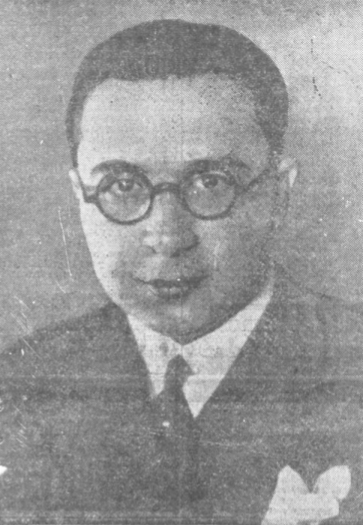
- Born: Joaquín Bau Nolla; 1897; Tortosa, Spain
- Died: 1973 (aged 75–76); Madrid, Spain
- Occupations: lawyer, politician
- Known for: Politician
- Political party: Unión Patriótica, CT, FET

Joaquín Bau Nolla, 1st Count of Bau (1897 – 1973) was a Spanish politician.

== Family and youth ==
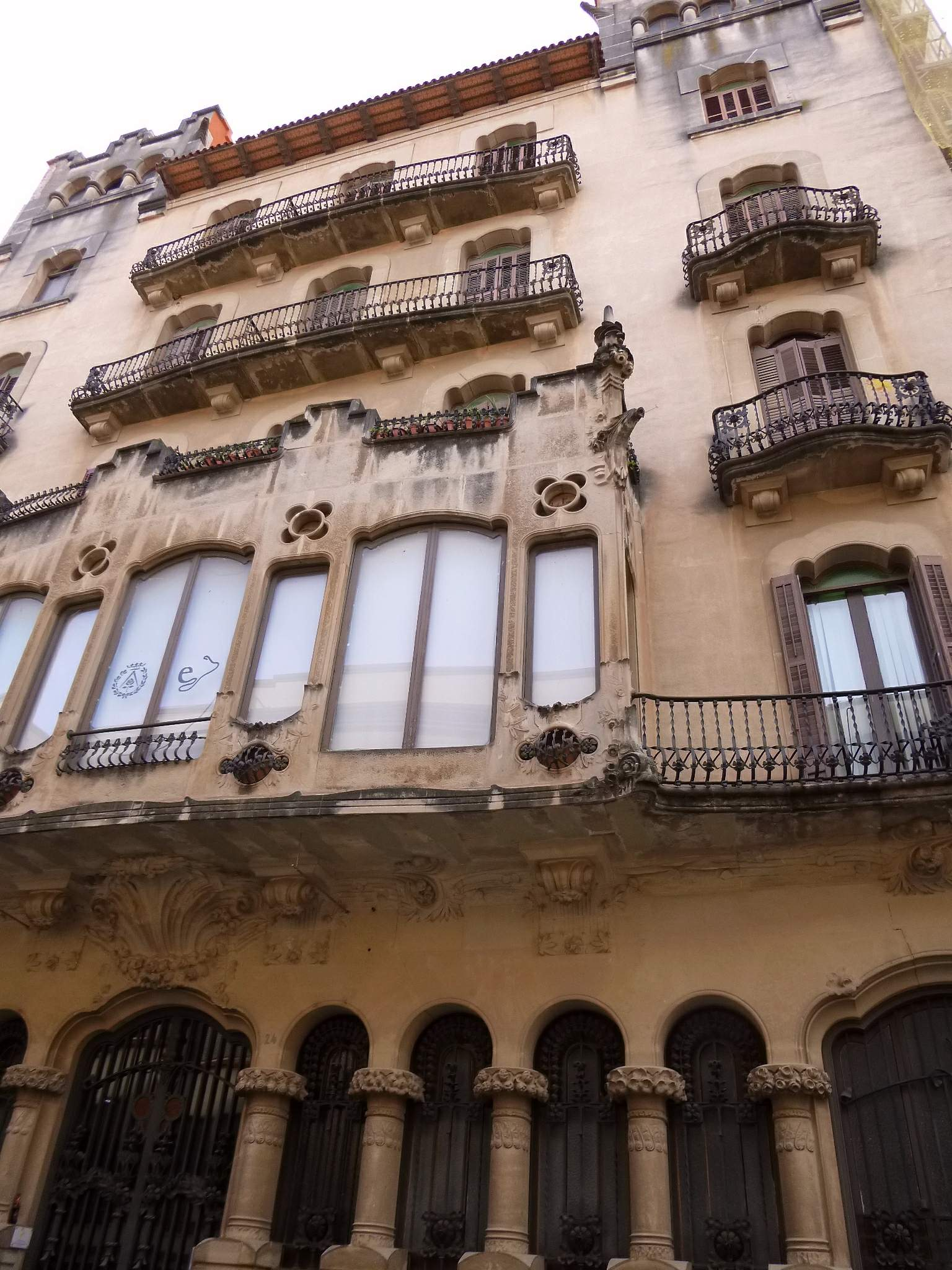
Casa Bau, Tortosa

Joaquín Bau Nolla was born to a bourgeoisie Catalan family. His paternal grandfather Miguel Bau Isern (1836-1911) ran a chocolate manufacture in Tortosa and served as mayor of the city in 1901-1903, co-founding Banc de Tortosa, Cambra Agricola de Tortosa and the local Cambra de Comerç. One of his 16 children and Joaquin's father, José Bau Vergés (1868-1935), was an oil and vinegar trader and producer. He grew from a local merchant, transporting oil on his mules, to "el rei de l'oli", the owner of Aceites Bau S.A., a Tortosa-based company operating two factories, selling on the national Spanish market and exporting to South America, especially to Argentina. Following the commercial success, Bau Vergés built an imposing family residence in Tortosa; he was also honorary consul of Uruguay and Argentina, member of local business organizations and a Catholic activist. In 1894 he married María Cinta Nolla Poy, a stonemason's daughter. The couple had 4 children, all brought up in highly religious ambience; Joaquín was their second son.

Following his early education in Colegio de San Pedro Apóstol of the Hermanos de las Escuelas Cristianas in Tortosa, the young Joaquín obtained his bachillerato in Colegio de los Hermanos de la Doctrina Cristiana in Barcelona, to complete military service in Regimiento de guarnición of Tarragona in 1921. Encouraged by his father, he passed commercial broker exams and rose to president of Junta Central de Corredores de Commercio de España in 1935. In 1933, he commenced law studies as unenrolled student and graduated from Faculty of Law of Universidad de Valencia in 1935. In 1920, Joaquín Bau married Pilar Elisa Carpi Esteller. The couple had 5 children; the oldest son Joaquín as a 16-year-old volunteered to the Carlist requeté unit, survived the Civil War and later became an engineer; José Luis served in the army as a lieutenant colonel and military judge, while Fernando practiced as a lawyer and a conservative politician. Between 1967 and 1977 he served in the Francoist Cortes; in 1991 he published Crònica de veinte años. 1957-1977.

== Mayor ==
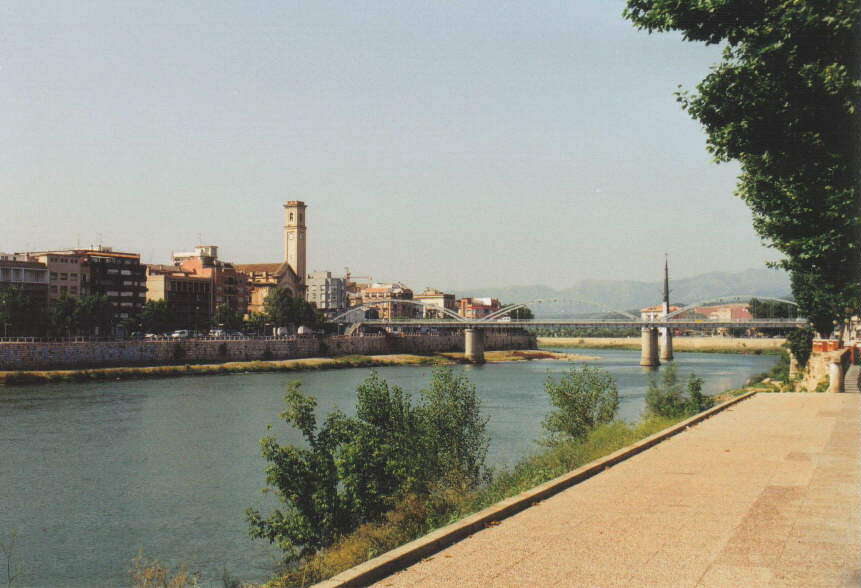
Ebro in Tortosa

Though Joaquín's paternal grandfather was a Liberal his father was already reported as Traditionalist and it was in his footsteps that Joaquín followed. As a youngster and teenager Bau engaged in local Traditionalist juvenile organisations. He became head of the Tortosa section of Requeté, a formation established in 1909 as a sporting and outdoor grouping for the Carlist youth. He seemed particularly fond of social and charity initiatives, organising Christmas for the poor, working in Patronato Escolar Obrero de la Sagrada Familia and co-founding Sindicatos Católicos Obreros. In the early 1920s he already emerged as a dynamic local politician. Once Primo de Rivera replaced the liberal restauración with dictatorship, Bau enthusiastically engaged in the nascent primoderiverista structures; in 1924 he co-founded the Tortosa branch of Unión Patriótica and became its jefe provincial.

During the period called "Bauisme" in the history of Tortosa, in 1925 Bau was unanimously elected mayor of the city, re-elected in 1928 and holding the post until 1930. His contribution was multifold; during 5 years the Bau-led ayuntamiento executed the plan of public works, consisting of modernization of city streets, refurbishment of public schools and hospitals and setting up regular fire brigade services. He inaugurated Instituto Nacional de Segunda Ensenanza and Escuela de Trabajo, expanded local railway line and enhanced the county road network. Much of his activity was about tackling Ebro-related issues, like floods, navigation, bridges or land re-cultivation. Largely successful and sort of celebrated by Alfonso de Borbón and the dictator as one of the youngest mayors, he nevertheless failed in his attempt to elevate Tortosa - since 1833 part of the Tarragona province - to the provincial capital range, the new unit to be carved out from these of Tarragona, Castellón and Teruel.

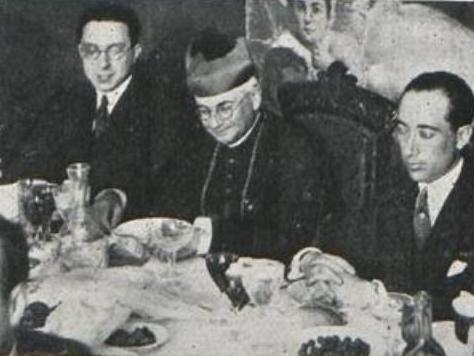
Bau as alcalde (1fL), 1925

Though dictatorship was initially welcomed by the Carlists as a stepping stone towards a Traditionalist monarchy, in 1925 the claimant Don Jaime switched to opposition. Bau decided not to follow suit and went on contributing to the regime; in literature he is usually listed along Victor Pradera and Esteban Bilbao as one of those Carlists who abandoned their king and joined the primoderiverista version of the Alfonsine monarchy. In 1927, he was appointed to the quasi-parliament, Asamblea Nacional Consultiva, standing as representative of Organizaciones provinciales de Unión Patriótica and representative of the Ayuntamientos; in the chamber he became one of the youngest members. He kept supporting the dictator by staging welcome celebrations in Tortosa and organizing manifestations of tortosinos in Madrid in 1928. In 1929, Bau was re-elected jefe of the local Unión Patriótica, engaged in Somatén, animated the youth branch named Juventud Patriótica and until 1930s financed a local Tortosa periodical, Unión Patriótica. He is deemed responsible for 1929 expulsion from the city of Marcelino Domingo, at that time a Republican activist in serious health condition.

== Deputy ==
Carlist standard

Bau ceased as Tortosa mayor in 1930; in 1931 he was accused of financial irregularities, though none of the charges raised has been concluded. As three Traditionalist branches united in 1932 Bau resumed his service to the legitimist king rejoining the Carlist organization, Comunión Tradicionalista. Within its structures he was heading the local Tortosa Requeté; as member of the Tarragona branch he had to accept leadership of the provincial jefe, Juan Maria Roma. In the 1933 elections he represented Carlism within the local Tarragonese Unió Ciutadana alliance and was elected. As a result, he emerged one of key figures in the Levantine Carlism, especially in the comarcas of Terres de l'Ebre, though following the death of Jaime Chicharro also in Castellón.

Voicing his support for the Catalan identity Bau has nevertheless opposed the adopted autonomous statute as irreconcilable with the Spanish raison d'etat and produced by "traidores a su Patria y a su honor". He demanded its derogation and replacement with a new autonomous statute, constructed along Traditionalist lines and properly reflecting the genuine personality of Catalonia. He sided with Francesc Cambó against the Catalan left-wing autonomism and supported Catalan landowners in the notorious Catalan Leases Act case. He also encouraged new Christian syndicates of the Tarragona province, confederated in Agrupacion Gremial de Trabajadores. In October 1934 he was active mounting local opposition to the revolutionary sway; his close collaborator, Jose Maria Sentis Simeon, co-ordinated action against the rebels in the province and was later appointed governors' delegate for Public Order. In 1935, Bau arranged for Guardia de Asalto detachment to be stationed in Tortosa.

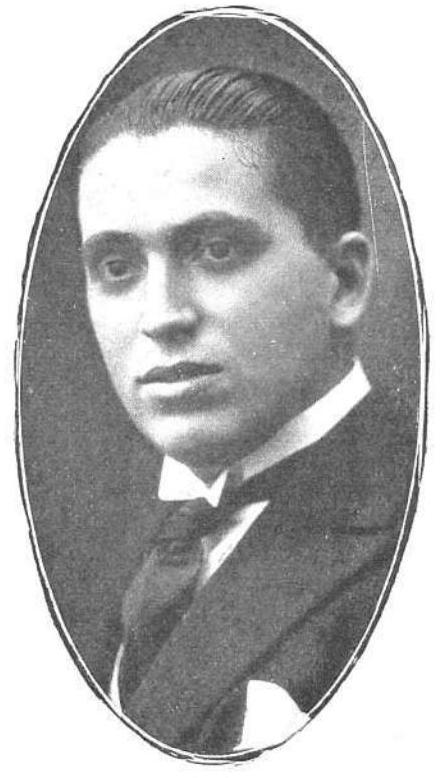
Calvo Sotelo

By many Carlists Bau was viewed with suspicion. This was due to his enthusiasm when engaging in alliance talks with the Alfonsinos and personal friendship with their leader, José Calvo Sotelo; though new Traditionalist jefe Manuel Fal approached Bloque Nacional as tactical option to be eventually abandoned, Bau was suspected of pushing for a dynastical compromise. In the spring of 1935 Don Alfonso Carlos and Fal considered Bau's activity in the Bloque intolerable and semi-rebellious. Also present-day scholars name his position as "conspiration", while others claim that he was loyal to Calvo rather than to Traditionalism. However, he was allowed to speak at massive Carlist meetings in Poblet and at Montserrat; he was also appointed to the Carlist Council of Economy.

Prior to the 1936 elections Bau advocated the strategy of a broad Right-wing alliance, an option which has never materialized; himself he competed on the list of Front Català d'Ordre and was elected from Tarragona. Shortly after the Frente Popular triumph was declared Bau and Calvo visited the prime minister Portela Valladares urging him to call the military and rule by decree; this was probably the most charged moment in his entire career. Once Lorenzo Maria Alier resigned as Carlist Catalan jefe in February 1936 one of the options considered was a triumvirate including Bau, but eventually it was Tomàs Caylà appointed the new regional leader.

== Commissioner ==
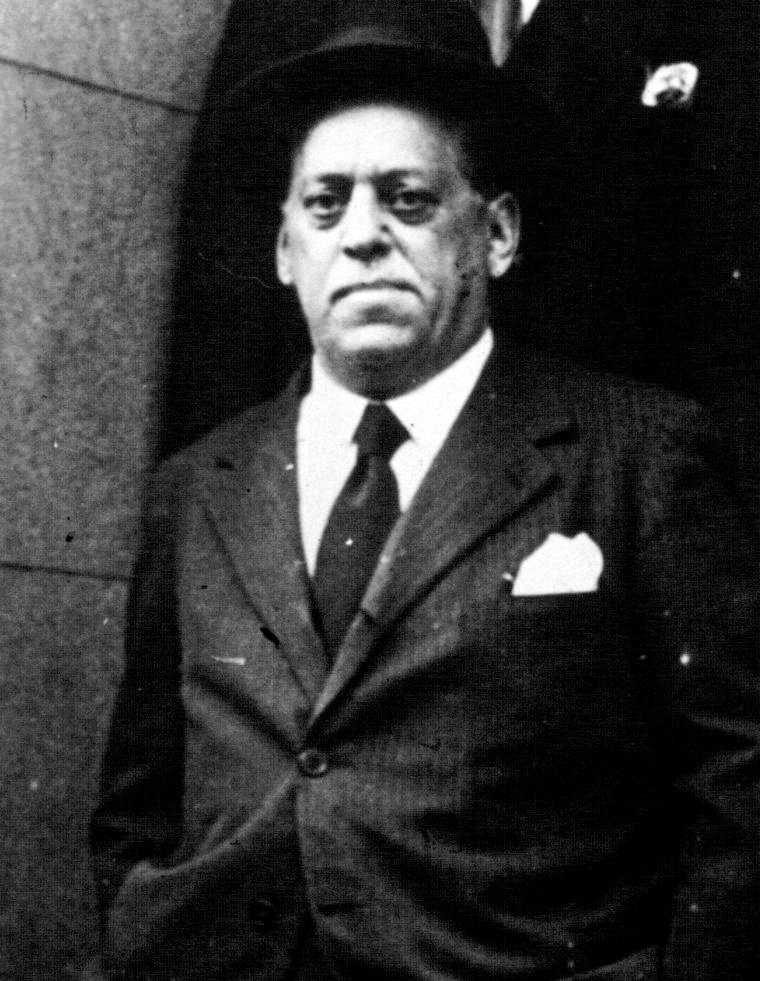
general Sanjurjo

Though until the summer of 1936 Bau was active in the Cortes, he was heavily engaged in anti-Republican conspiracy, serving as a Carlist link to Renovación Española. Following the death of Calvo Sotelo he travelled to Portugal to negotiate details of the rebellion with José Sanjurjo, personally witnessing the crash of general's aircraft. Since Bau was originally scheduled to communicate uprising orders to requeté units in southern Catalonia, his departure impaired Carlist insurgent structures in Terres de l'Ebre. Shortly after the hostilities broke out he returned from Portugal to Burgos in the Nationalist zone.

In early September 1936, the supreme governing body of the rebels, Junta de Defensa Nacional, constituted Comisión de Industria y Comercio, a substitute for Ministry of Economy. Bau, considered by Franco one of the more collaborative Carlists, was appointed one of its seven members; his high nomination was allegedly related to ability to arrange finance through Catalan contacts who had fled abroad. A month later the newly established Junta Técnica del Estado set up Comisión de Industria, Comercio y Abastos with Bau appointed its president, the de facto minister of economy in the Nationalist zone. As head of 7 commissions formed and one of 16 members of the Junta Técnica, he rapidly grew to top Nationalist executive.

Bau's primary task was to keep production running and to build the gold deposit reserve of the Nationalists; he was subsequently involved in currency reform, first organizing the stamping of pre-War notes and then arranging for a new Nationalist peseta to be printed in Germany. The next objective was to control foreign trade and direct the flow of deficient components accordingly, which was attempted by numerous regulatory means. At that time Bau considered himself an advocate of the "directed" economy; as an economist he was considered a disciple of Calvo Sotelo. Heavily involved in dealings with semi-official Nazi companies, HISMA and ROWAK, he objected to increase of German stakes, though key decisions were probably beyond his capacity. He hugely contributed to the Nationalist logistics by closing international deals covering 600 Fiat cars and 1,000 Studebaker chassis.

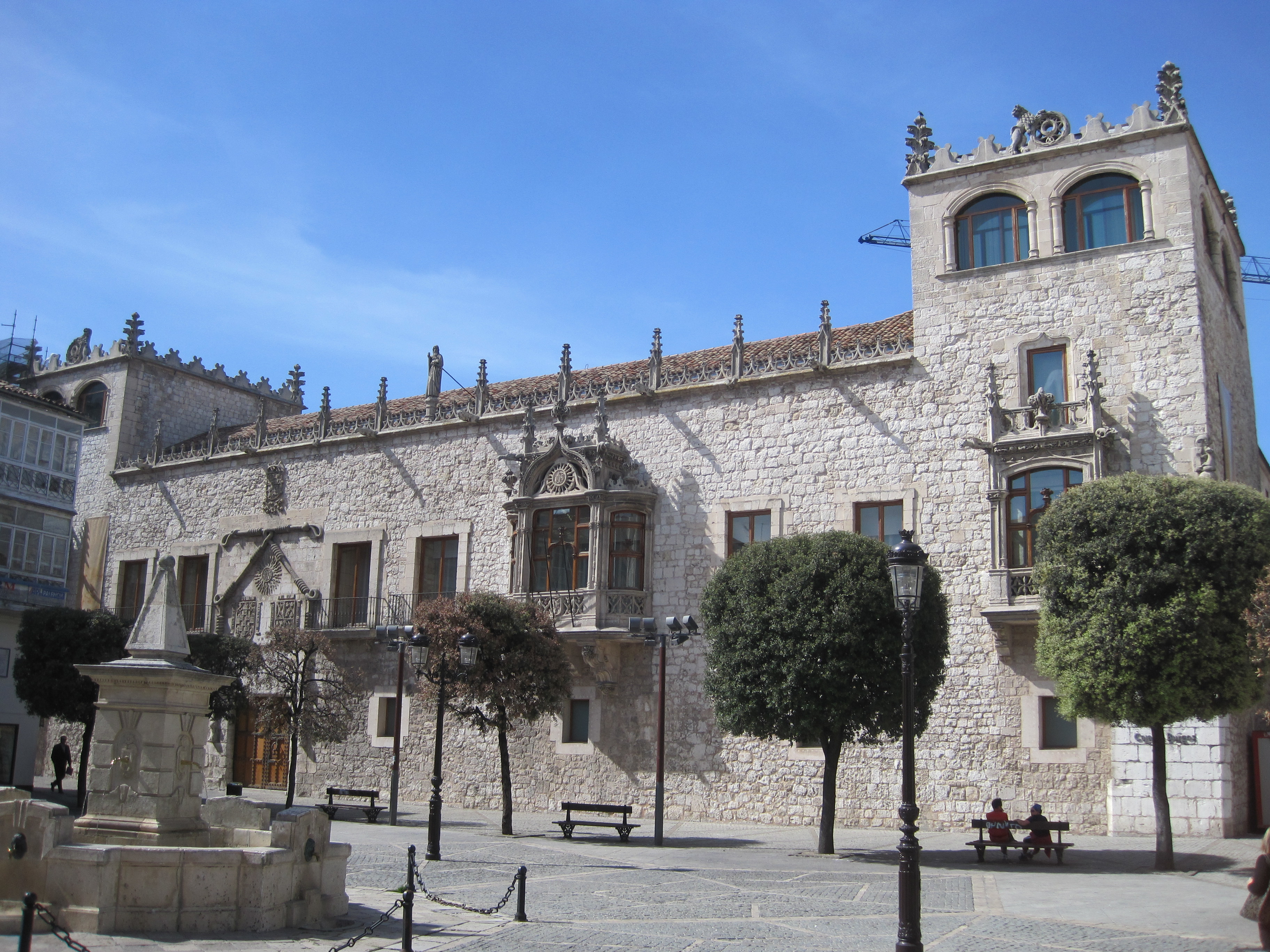
Burgos, site of Junta Técnica

Bau's relations with Carlism are not clear. According to one source, he took advantage of his position by procuring arms designed specifically for the requetés; according to another, starting late 1936 he assisted in organization of Terç de Requetès de la Mare de Déu de Montserrat, the requeté battalion consisting of Carlist refugees from Catalonia. On the other hand, he is not known to have protested against Franco's measures against Manuel Fal; even detailed studies dealing with amalgamation of Carlism within Francoism in 1936-7 do not mention Bau, which suggests that at that time he was already hardly involved in Traditionalism. It seems that he unconditionally accepted Unification Decree and was leading Catalan Carlists co-operating with Franco; some scholars compare the role he played in Catalonia to the role played by Tomás Domínguez Arévalo in Vasco-Navarrese area. Considered rebellious by Manuel Fal and the new regent-claimant Don Javier, at an unspecified date he was expulsed from Carlism.

== Outcast ==
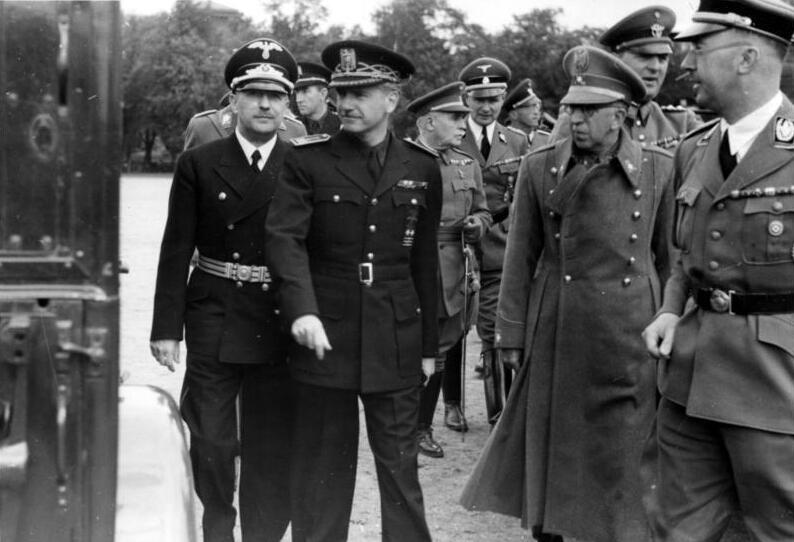
Ramón Serrano Suñer, 1940

Bau's influence started to decline once Ramón Serrano Suñer arrived in Burgos. Upon arrival he was already averse towards Bau as late 1936 Franco decided that it would be the family of Bau, not the family of Serrano, to be exchanged with the Republicans for the family of general Miaja. The animosity grew during 1937, when Bau opposed totalitarian designs pursued by Franco's cuñado. When the first regular Francoist government was created early 1938 Bau was not even considered. In the spring of 1938 he left Burgos, settling in San Sebastián.

Together with many Catalan industry tycoons taking refuge in the Gipuzkoan capital, Bau engaged in plans to re-create regional economic institutions once Catalonia would be retaken by the Nationalist troops. He was offered presidency of l'Institut Catala de Sant Isidre, the regional agricultural organization, but declined quoting his hostile relations with Serrano. Indeed, the internal Falangist document denounced him as one of the leaders of local "plutocratas y alta burguesia" who conspired against the national-syndicalist state.

Bau kept supporting the Catalan Montserrat battalion. He remained involved in numerous charity projects, like Auxilio de Invierno. The most important of Bau's ventures of that period was probably helping the Catalan Republican POWs. Personal acquaintance of officers commanding Campos de Concentración and Comisíon Clasificadora, Bau did his best to release Catalan prisoners and enlist them either in the Carlist tercios or in the Falangist banderas. Following the end of the war he returned to Tortosa, though he is not listed as taking part in the Carlist-Falangist competition for power in Catalonia.

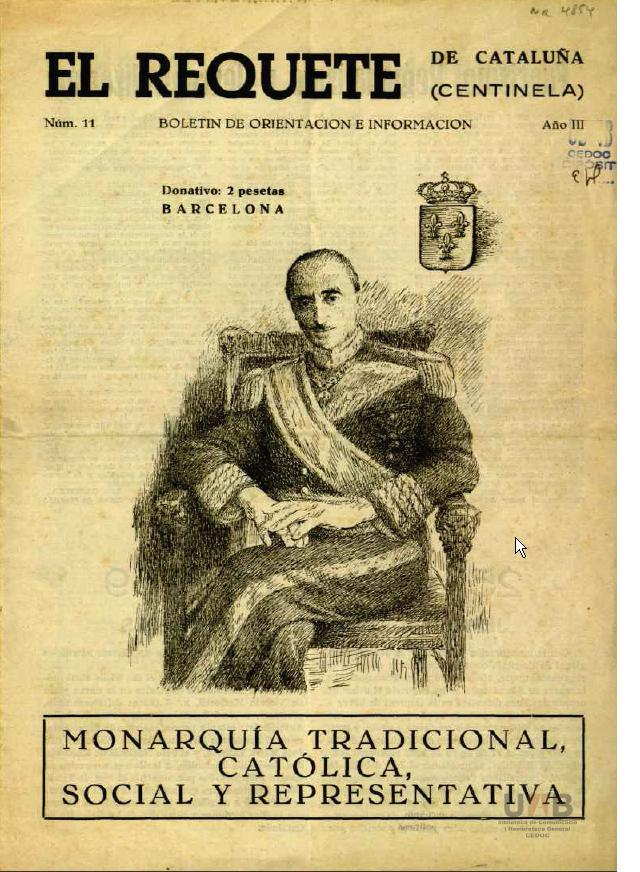
S. M. Javier I, 1959

Bau was not invited to the victory parade of May 19, 1939. Though sidetracked in great national politics, he remained engaged in clandestine and extremely sensitive Francoist business schemes. In 1941–42, he managed the deal with Nazi Oberkommando der Marine, supervising construction of 20 wooden ships intended to supply German troops fighting the British in Africa. Later on he kept exchanging courteous but purely formal correspondence with Franco. In the 1940s Bau dedicated himself to family issues, various Catholic organizations and business; he became the first post-war president of Banco de Tortosa and later multiplied his wealth by trading shares of the bank, going on also with the inherited Aceites Bau business. Privately he pursued his interest in organ music.

Bau led one of 3 competing Traditionalist Tarragona factions, namely the one opposing Carloctavistas and javieristas and promoting rapprochement with the Alfonsist claimant, Don Juan. The Tortosa javierista Carlists distributed leaflets presenting him as Francoist traitor who ignored the lot of requetés detained by the Francoist administration. He apparently acknowledged that a future kingdom must encompass Francoist structures. His private papers from mid-1950s suggest that Bau, though with hesitation, tended to support what seemed a long-distance Franco's plan for crowning prince Juan Carlos. However, when in 1957 he joined the Carlists who abandoned the regent-claimant Don Javier, Bau declared Juan Carlos' father, Don Juan, the legitimate heir and continued to approach him as a king.

== Francoist dignitary ==
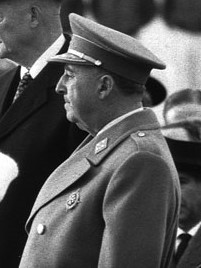
Francisco Franco, 1959

In mid-1950s, Franco shelved totalitarian plans and opted for a hybrid line of development, he started looking for loyal individuals not associated with Falangism; 1958 produced huge turnover of procuradores nominated to the quasi-parliament, Cortes Españolas. The dictator appointed Bau member of Consejo Nacional of the Falange, which automatically ensured the Cortes mandate. He got his seat confirmed in 5 successive legislatives, appointed also in 1961, 1964, 1967 and 1971. As his career was re-launched, Bau kept assuming higher and higher posts. In 1963 he started leading various parliamentary committees, formally nominated president of the internal affairs committee in 1964, president of Leyes Fundamentales committee in 1965 and then other committees working on new constitutional laws. In 1965 he was appointed president of Consejo de Estado, a body adding to extreme complexity of Francoist power structures and being part of Franco's recipe for political balance. The appointment produced his nomination to Consejo del Reino, another body with some competencies related to monarchical establishments. In 1970 Bau was nominated its vice-president. As one of the regime's highest dignitaries in the late 1960s he became one of faces of Francoism. Shortly before his death he was made Conde de Bau.

Bau's rise from political non-existence to president of Consejo de Estado in just 7 years was possible as he proved acceptable to most groupings competing for power within Francoism. Deprived of own political background, he posed no threat and might have been considered as sympathetic to their cause by Carlists, monarchists, technocrats (by virtue of his business activities and friendship with López Rodó), the Church and even the military (maintained friendly relations with many high-ranking generals); it was only the Falangist syndicalists that he remained at odds with. Bau, always impeccably elegant, boosted his career by oratory skills and non-belligerent, silky presiding style in numerous bodies of the regime, excelling in conflict management and demonstrating sort of impartiality, combined with perfect loyalty to Franco.

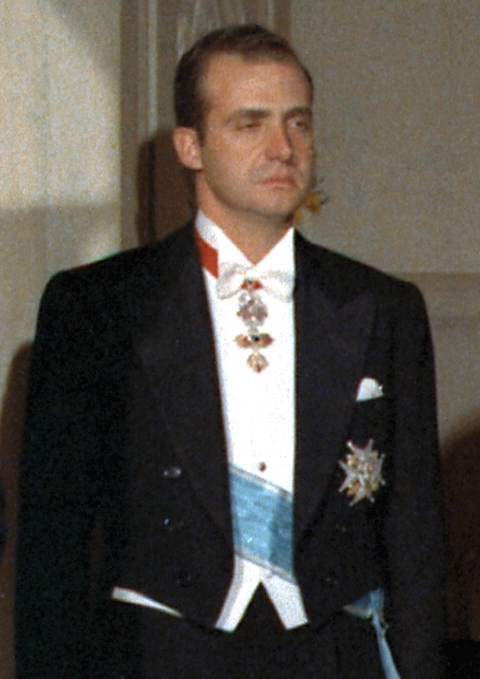
Prince of Spain, 1971

Bau's own political outlook may be summarised as a watered-down authoritarian, non-dynastical monarchism based on diehard (marchamartillo) Catholicism. Following his return to great politics in 1958 he emerged as one of the most prominent monarchists, contributing to shaping of late Francoism in course of works on various key legal structures of the system. Far from political militancy, starting mid-1960s Bau began to press the monarchical cause by advocating adoption of Ley Orgánica and Ley de Designación. Mocked by some critics as himself the best successor to Franco, Bau could have considered his efforts crowned when Juan Carlos was officially confirmed as Franco's successor in 1969, though as late as 1970 he kept fighting the regentialistas, first headed by Muñoz Grandez and then by Valcárcel. When in the early 1970s advising Juan Carlos on prospective course to be adopted, he suggested Federico Silva Muñoz as the man for future. He retained Catalan identity taking part in a number of regional initiatives and bodies, always perfectly within the limits permitted by the regime.

== Legacy ==
Joaquín Bau is commemorated by a very short street in Madrid, a parking-lot-plaza in the Ferreries district of Tortosa (until 2017) and a long backyard drive in the resort town of Benicàssim, where the family owns a summer residence purchased by Bau in the 1950s; some of them are subject to various initiatives aiming at purging public space from Francoist or Fascist symbols. No trace of Bau having been named "hijo predilecto" of Tortosa in 1966 can be found on the official ayuntamiento web page. Since 1956 until 2018 one of Tortosa colleges was named "Institut Joaquín Bau" (today Institut Dertosa), though there was a failed attempt to change the patron in 1983. Bau's biography, in large part a hagiographical compilation of his correspondence from the private archive, was published in 2001; the author defined Bau as a conservative monarchist and played down Carlist threads, ignoring also most controversial episodes from his lifetime. Condado de Bau is still functional and currently remains held by Bau's grandson.

== See also ==
- Carlism
- Carlo-francoism
- Francoist Spain
