= Alier =

Alier is a name. Notable people with this name include:

- Abel Alier (born 1933), South Sudanese politician and judge
- Alier Ashurmamadov (born 1970), Tajikistani footballer
- Joan Martinez Alier (born 1939), Spanish economist
- Lorenzo Alier Cassi (1878–1942), Spanish lawyer and politician
