= Tomàs Caylà i Grau =

Spanish Carlist politician

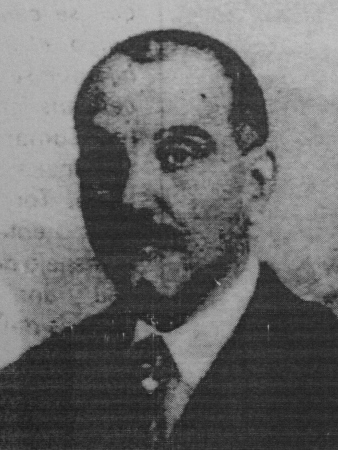
- Born: Tomàs Caylà i Grau; 1895; Valls, Spain
- Died: 1936 (aged 40–41); Valls, Spain
- Citizenship: Spanish
- Occupations: Publisher, politician
- Political party: Comunión Tradicionalista

Tomàs Caylà i Grau (1895–1936) was a Spanish publisher and a Carlist politician.

== Family and youth ==
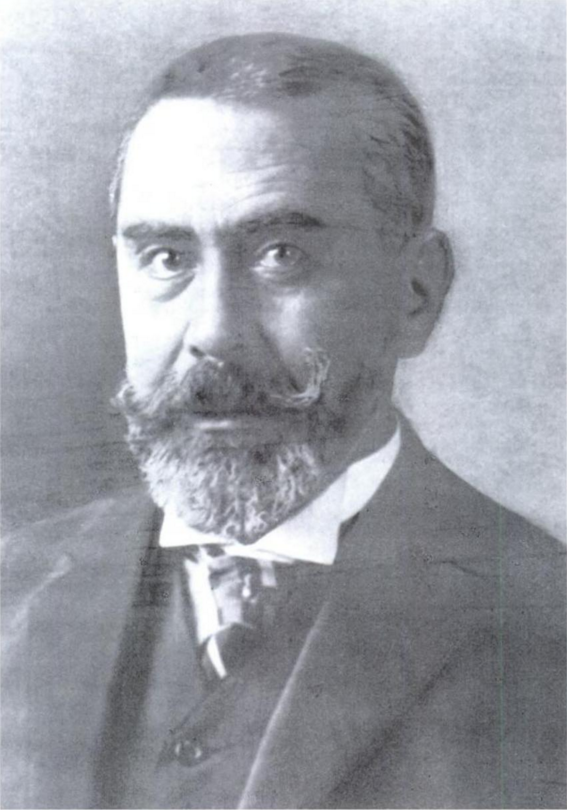
father

Tomàs d'Aquino Caylà i Grau was descendant to a well-off Catalan family. His grandfather, Tomás Caylá y Sardá (1810–1888), was member of the emerging Tarragona bourgeoisie. He fought for the liberal side against the Carlists in the First Carlist War (1833–1840) and was then mayor of Reus and a friend of General Prim. His father, Josep Caylà i Miracle (1856–1919), studied law in University of Barcelona; following 1881 graduation he settled in Valls, the capital of Alt Camp county in the Tarragona province. He became secretary and then co-owner of the newly created Banc de Valls, growing to its director in 1914; he was also administrator of rural holdings belonging to the local Vaciana and Miguel families. Active in the local business milieu, he co-founded the local landholders’ organization Sindicato Agrícola de Valls and represented it on various fora, becoming also president of the local Asociación de Propietarios. In 1894 Josep married Teresa Grau i Torner (1865–1943). The couple had 3 children; two sons died in their early infancy.

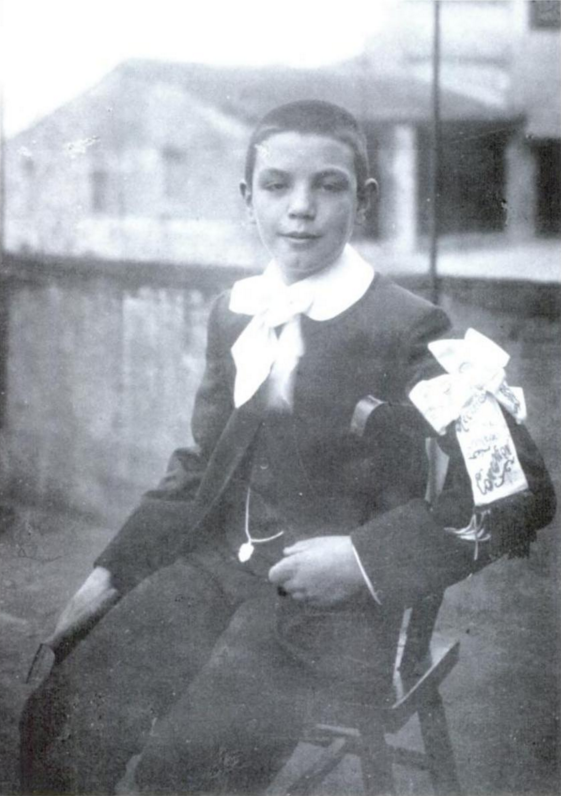
Tomàs at his first communion, 1905

Tomàs was brought up in fervently religious ambience; both his parents were profoundly Catholic. Josep Caylà served as president of the local Ateneu Católic and secretary of Germandat de Cristaires in the local parish, apart from performing other minor functions. Nothing is known of his political preferences apart that he was attached to traditional values; he nurtured the idea of society organized along religious lines and animated by the spirit of harmonious co-operation. Demonstrating vivid interest in social question, he was committed to his vision of social responsibility and promoted the idea when presiding over the proprietors’ association. He is credited for bringing the concept into life when dealing with local vineyard tenants affected by the phylloxera plague. During unrest triggered by massive strike in the Catalan electricity sector in 1919 he was assassinated on the Valls street in what was probably an anarchist ambush.

Following his earlier education in 1911 Tomàs moved to Barcelona, where he started to study law; he graduated in derecho in 1916 and commenced practicing in his native Valls, gaining anecdotal reputation for his honesty and dedication. Inheriting fervently religious outlook he commenced activities in various lay Catholic organizations; he was co-founder and active member of the local Congregacio Mariana de la Verge de la Candela and helped to set up its review Estel Maria. Caylà has never married; as he explained to his mother, he intended to dedicate himself entirely to the cause of God served by means of Traditionalism.

== Restoration and dictatorship ==
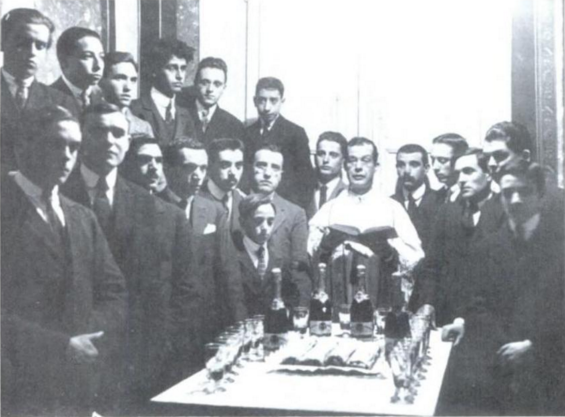
Cayla launching Joventud, 1919

In 1919 young local activists led by Caylà founded a Valls-based weekly titled Joventut. Spanning across modest 4 pages and appearing with the sub-heading Per la fe i per la pátria, the periodical was issued in Valls and partially other comarcas of the Tarragona province; its circulation remains unknown. Contemporary scholar classified its political line as conservative, another present-day biographer underlines that it was based on ideas of Christian humanism and justice. Caylà and the co-founders explained their political identity in a clear-cut manifesto, declaring themselves to be first Catholics, then Spaniards, then Catalans, then Traditionalists and finally legitimists. Caylà emerged as the moving spirit, manager, chief author and organizer of the weekly, which remained sort of his personal tribune for the next 17 years. He contributed under his own name or using various pen-names, most commonly "C.V." and "Almogáver"; his contemporaries admired him for writing ease.

Freshly graduated, launching his law career and active in the local Circol Jaumista, in 1920 Caylà ran on the Carlist ticket in elections to the municipal council, but was reprimanded by the party leader of the province, Joaquín Avellá, who made public that Caylà had not been nominated by the party. Local Carlists responded by claiming that Avellá only intended to favour the candidacy of his own brother, a member of the Conservative Party. Caylà could not get elected. However, in 1922 he ran again and was elected regidor as one of the most popular candidates. His career did not last long; the coming of the Primo de Rivera dictatorship in 1923 spelled replacement of elected bodies with the appointees; Joventut could have only lambasted the new regime for its corrupted political machinery. Things went from bad to worse in 1924, when Caylà and the young Jaimistas attempted to stage Festa dels Veterans and celebrate the 50th anniversary of Carlist takeover of the province; the regime reacted by closing circulos, suspending Joventut for 2 weeks and detaining Caylà, who spent 5 days in Tarragona prison and was ordered a month of exile in Lleida. Also during the years to come Joventut refused to endorse attempts to institutionalize the regime and rebuked its inefficiency and disregard for genuine representation, in result suffering 5 fines, 2 suspensions and 2 detentions.

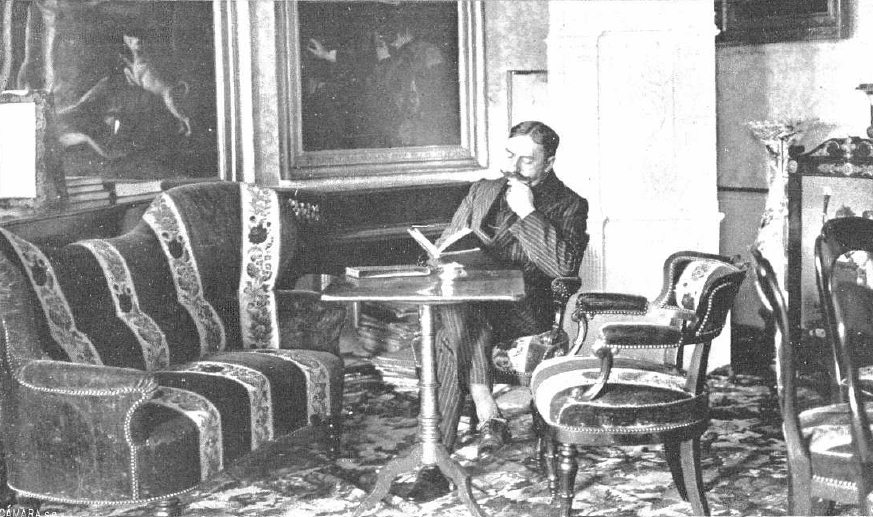
S.M. Jaime III

Joventut was euphoric about Primo's fall. During Dictablanda Caylà was administratively reinstated as member of the local council and actively resumed his public activities, like staging the Carlist Fiesta de los Mártires de la Tradición celebrations in 1930. Since Spanish politics seemed dominated by bewilderment, he advocated Catholic principles as general guidance and prayer, sacraments and mass as 3 ordinary day duties. In terms of political solutions he championed spiritual role of Vatican and papal teaching, which translated into his hostile stance towards Liberalism. Though loyal to the Carlist king Jaime III, unlike most Carlists he was not vocal as a monarchist. Demonstrating some accidentalism and what was already becoming his typical conciliatory and non-belligerent tone, he rather advocated common work for Spain, be it a kingdom or a republic, far more important having been a new constitution, centered on traditional values.

== Republic ==
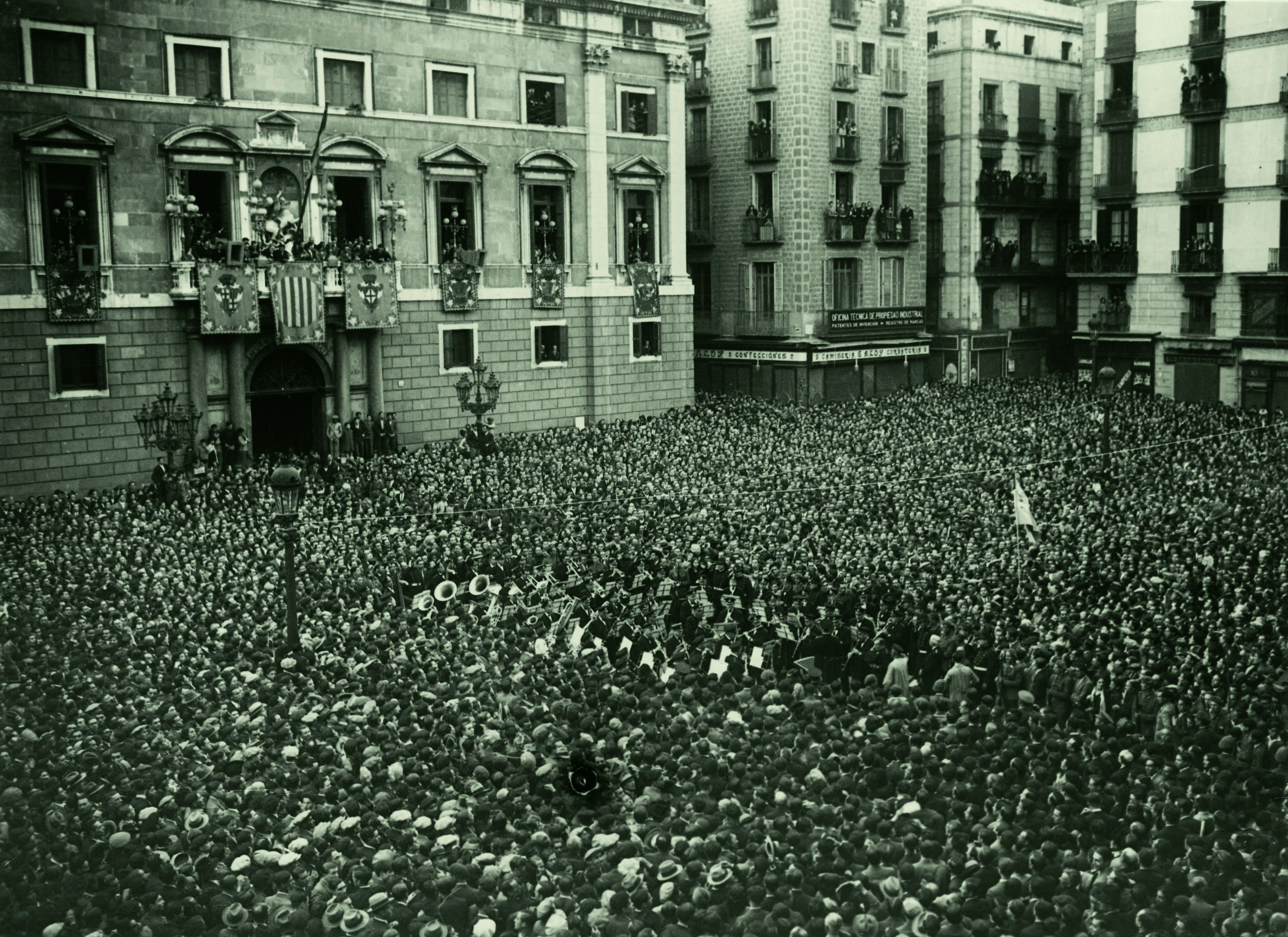
Republic declared, Barcelona 1931

Like many Carlists Caylà welcomed the fall of Alfonsist monarchy, unlike most of them he did not demonstrate hostility to the Republic and – clearly against most Carlists – he hoped that it would produce a genuine democracy. In his Joventut editorials Caylà remained cautious and preferred not to jump to conclusions as to the new regime. As a monarchist loyal to the carlist claimant he acknowledged with little enthusiasm that the majority of Spaniards opted for republican solution, though he seemed to respect the choice. He called his fellow Carlists not to renounce their vision, suggesting to see whether the Republic would turn into an orderly state or whether the project would fail. In his trademark style he warned that extremism was the key enemy of the new regime.

Militant secularism of the Republic started to turn Caylà into its enemy; he was also increasingly embittered by what he perceived as arrogant Republican-Socialist domination in the Valls council. In 1932 he unsuccessfully ran for the Catalan parliament from the Unio Ciutadana list; following triumphant Esquerra victory he was forced to walk out of l’Ajuntamient and later kept denouncing decomposition of local authorities and growing chaos in Valls. Fearing the forthcoming revolution Caylà started to present Traditionalism as the only bulwark which could stop it, with the government controlled by freemasonry and serving foreign interests. As the Joventut line hardened, it became target of administrative sanctions; the periodical was suspended from August to November 1932 with support for Sanjuriada quoted as a justification. Other penalties soon followed, be it either heavy fines, further suspensions or detentions.

Gradually Caylà started to emerge as one of the most dynamic politicians of the Catalan Carlism. In late 1931, already as part of the ongoing unification of three Traditionalist branches, he was nominated the provincial Tarragona jefe and soon took part in re-organization of Comunión Tradicionalista, engineered by its new leader Manuel Fal. Its revitalized paramilitary section was called into action during the October 1934 insurgency, as Caylà ordered mobilisation of provincial Requeté. Some sources claim that he prevented the Catalanists from seizing power in Tarragona, other works suggest that his role was marginal. Afterwards he lambasted Generalitat for launching a potentially most inhuman and uncivilized mayhem that Catalonia has ever seen.

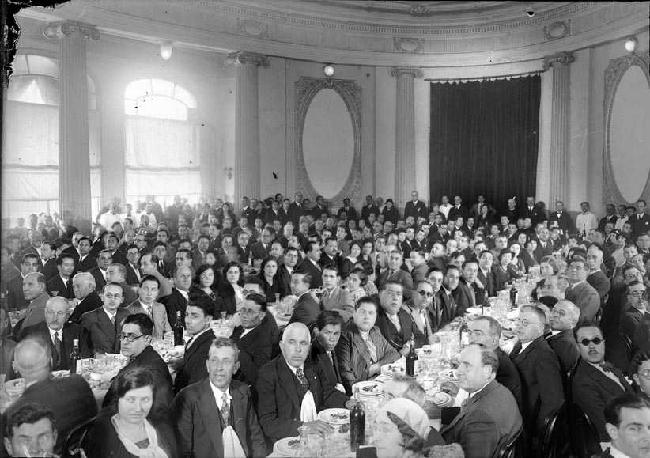
Carlist meeting, Barcelona, 1930s

Caylà was busy organizing and speaking at many Carlist meetings in 1934 and 1935, the most impressive having been the gathering in Poblet in June 1935, with 40,000 people attending. At that point Tarragona Carlism was boasting 30 circulos, 4 periodicals and 400 local councilors. The Catalan Carlist leader Lorenzo Maria Alier Cassi resigned after the February 1936 elections; though some scholars claim that due to his Catalanism Caylà was increasingly alienated within the national Carlist executive, in March it was him nominated the new regional lead and assuming jefatura of probably the third most important Carlist region. Given his rather non-belligerent atypical Carlist profile it is not clear what mechanism led to the nomination; probably his fervent religiosity and indeed his Catalanism were not marginal factors.

== Catalan question ==
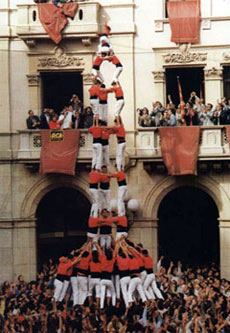
castell

The national question remained one of key threads of Caylà's writings, perhaps second only to his fierce defense of the Catholic faith. Throughout all public career he vehemently supported Catalan cultural and political ambitions, yet always combined with the Spanish raison d’etat.

In the 1919 declaration Caylà listed his Catalan identity as third in terms of importance, put after the Catholic and Spanish ones; the statement clearly implied that being Catalan and being Spanish were complementary selves. Supporting various cultural initiatives he also acknowledged Catalan political ambitions, best embodied in the autonomous project; for Caylà, separate regional establishments were rooted in the Carlist vision. His concept embraced Catalonia federated with Castile, the Madrid king ruling as Comte de Barcelona provided he swears to the local fueros. The regional diet was supposed to have decisive say on administrative, fiscal and economic issues, with diputación forming the Catalan executive and municipalities allowed large degree of their own autonomy. Though all Catalans were obliged to defend the country, according to Caylà Madrid was not allowed conscription.

During dictatorship Caylà kept supporting Catalan ambitions, highly sympathetic to Macia and highly critical towards governmental measures applied against him after the Prats de Molló affair. He retained his juvenile autonomous vision later on, presented in a series of articles published in Joventut in 1930. A contemporary scholar compared it to the radical La Habana version and another one claimed that it was not far from endorsing political independence. Also in present-day Catalanist publications his articles from that period are quoted when referring to unity of Spain as “a parody”, however this particular phrase was intended not to question the Spanish integrity as such but rather to mock the inefficient and propaganda-embroidered late primoderiverista version. It is not clear to what extent Caylà contributed to the official Carlist autonomy project revealed in 1930; it was founded on similar highly federative concept, elaborated in more detail and embracing organic elections to the local diet. Following the advent of the Republic Carlism backtracked, prompting defection of some of its most pro-Catalanist members; Caylà was not among them.

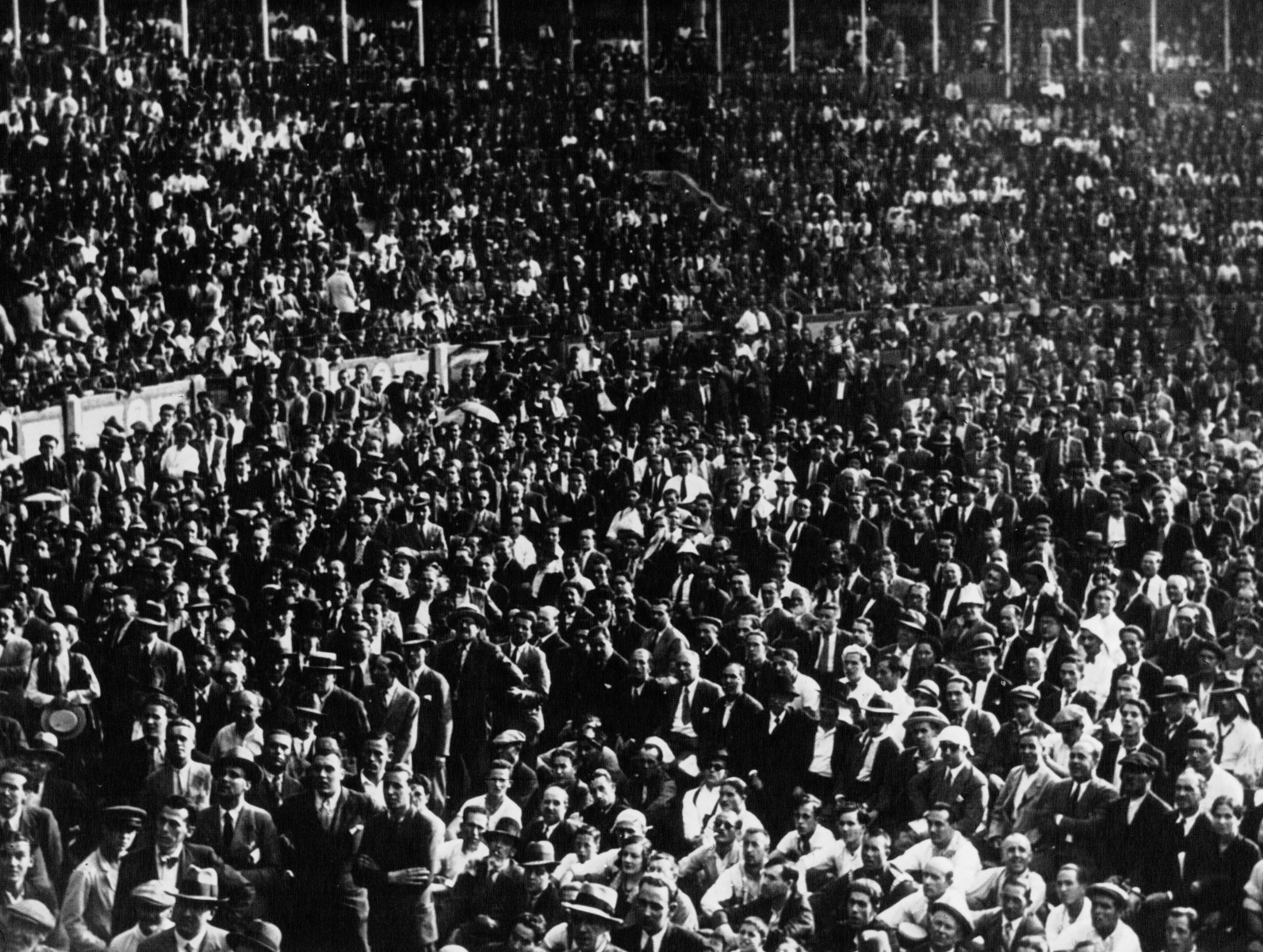
anti-statute meeting

The turn of Catalan case during the Republic left Caylà hugely disappointed. Enthusiastically supportive about the ongoing talks on autonomous statute, he refused to join the militant anti-Spanish Catalanization wave and opposed separatism, at best lukewarm about the ultimately prevailing, allegedly integral vision of the Republic. He believed that in the autonomous agreement the Catalan rights should have taken precedence instead of having been subordinated to the Spanish constitution. Last but not least, Caylà was profoundly unhappy about secular character of the autonomy and accepted the statute not as an ultimate solution but rather as a stepping stone towards his vision. Disappointed about final shape assumed by the accepted statute, Caylà was desperate about its practical embodiment and political stance assumed by the Generalitat. Always sympathetic to the conservative Lliga, he was alarmed by militancy of Companys and the Catalan Left, denouncing “el feixisme esquerrá” and what he considered potentially barbarian course of October 1934, though he opposed suspension of the autonomy.

== Social question ==
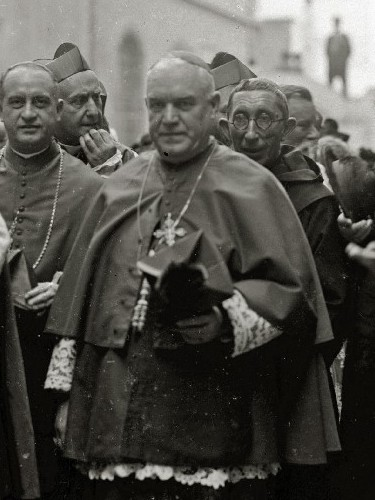
Christian way: primate Goma

Caylà inherited social sensitivity from his father, possibly reinforced rather than weakened by the fact that his parent was killed as result of the social conflict. As early as during the late Restoration period he kept discussing the issue on gatherings of the Valls Traditionalists. Acknowledging that “el problema social [...] és el primer problema de l’Estat espanyol”, he approached the question mostly in religious terms, perceiving it as consequence of dechristianisation or at best religious indifference of modern societies, which attempted to substitute God with false idols. Ringing a typically Carlist tone he saw Liberalism as primordial source of evil, anti-Christian, anti-fuerista and anti-social, leading to alienation of enslaved proletarian masses. To Caylà the popular movements of the Left, undistinguished into Anarchism, Socialism or Communism and approached jointly as “red syndicalism”, were deceiving the masses by utopian visions of fictitious liberty and turning the Catalan idea into “branch of the Russian ideology”.

According to Caylà, there were two concepts of tackling the burning social issue: the Socialist one and the Christian one, the latter laid out in papal teachings of Rerum novarum and Quadragesimo anno. Instead of class warfare it offered a harmonious vision of a society, stemming from Catholic principles and achieved by means of various regulatory bodies. However, none of the sources consulted mentions Caylà as engaged either in typical Christian-democratic initiatives of this era, like Asociación Católica Nacional de Propagandistas and Juventud Católica, or in various political incarnations of Social-Catholicism. His criticism of laissez-faire has also never amounted to general onslaught on capitalism; considering private property and individual self foundations of civilized society he followed Vatican in its harsh judgment of “capitalisme liberal” and unlimited accumulation of wealth.

Carlist standard

Political and social toolset intended to defuse the social conflict was very much dependent on Christian trade unions and various associations of employers and employees. Though not an entrepreneur, Caylà tried to lead by example; in Valls he set up Carlist social association Agrupació Social Tradicionalista, animated its Casa Social and served as its treasurer. He kept encouraging co-operative initiatives like Cooperativa Electrica de Valls, perceived as an alternative to anonymous commercial enterprises. He also encouraged new Christian syndicates of the Tarragona province, Gremios Obreros and Gremios Patronales, confederated in Agrupacion Gremial de Trabajadores. When running for the provincial Catalan parliament he competed in Tarragona as a member of the rightist coalition Unió Ciutadana, while Carlists from Barcelona formed Dreta de Catalunya, endorsed by the then Catalan Carlist jefe Junyent.

== Final months ==
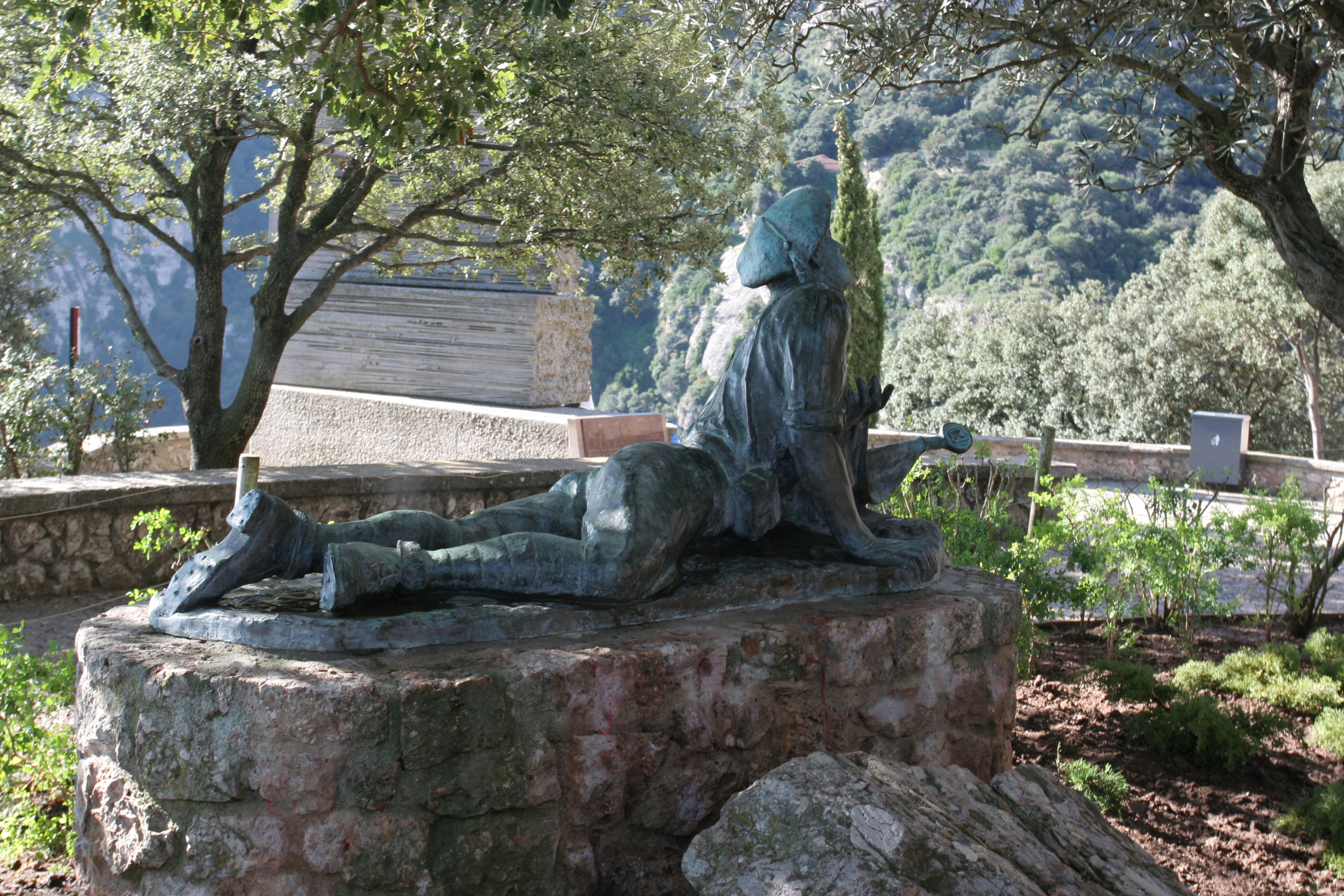
monument to Catalan requetés

There are conflicting accounts of Caylà's position towards the Carlist anti-Republican buildup during the last few months prior to the July 1936 coup. According to one version, following the frentepopulista electoral victory Caylà threw himself into conspiracy. One day after the anti-republican coup had started in Spanish Morocco, he hoped that the insurrection would succeed. According to another, he confronted the insurgent line promoted by Tomás Domínguez Arévalo and Fal and voiced against the alliance with the rebellious military, but was overruled by the Carlist executive. According to yet another account, Caylà himself conspired with the generals, but he considered insurgent initiatives premature and urged the plotters to step in only as reaction to a would-be coup attempted by the Left. Finally, the most detailed biographical work claims that in the early summer of 1936 Caylà made a tragic figure, horrified by protorevolutionary turn of the Republic but unwilling to join a conservative rebellion against it.

During the July 1936 coup the Catalan Requeté organization led by was allegedly prepared to field 3,100 volunteers in the first line and further 15,000 as auxiliaries; mobilisation of Carlist paramilitary was directed by its regional leader José Cunill, yet regardless of his pacifist outlook Caylà must have approved of the process. During the outbreak of hostilities he was running his daily party business in Barcelona; though he was leading Carlism in its third most important region some authors claim that he learnt of the insurgency from the radio broadcast. He left leadership of the Requeté to Cunill and witnessed failure of the coup in the Catalan capital, in 2 days the Carlist volunteers reduced to total disarray, some killed, some captured, some fleeing and some going into hiding.

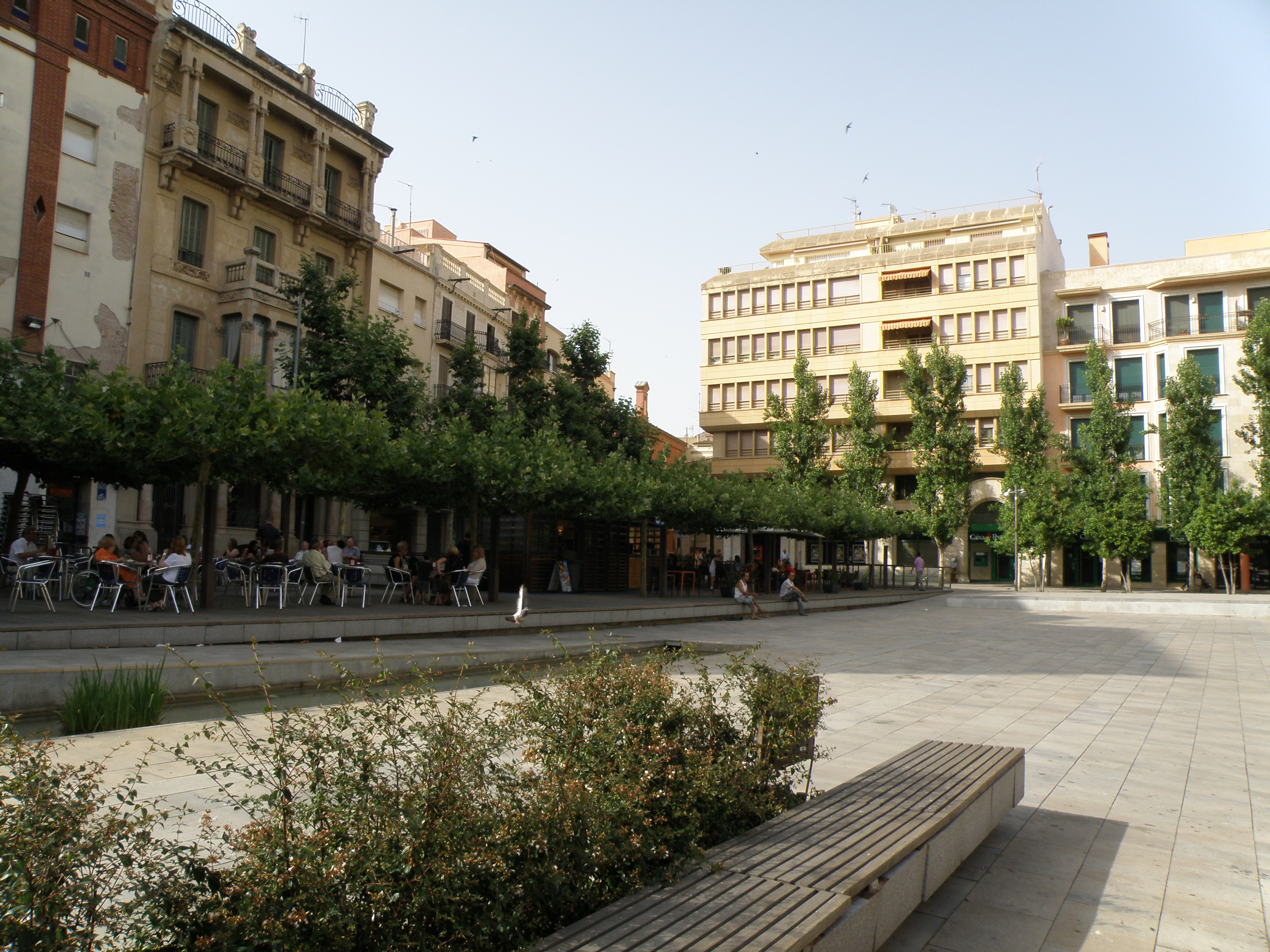
Plaça del Pati, Valls

Caylà himself initially stayed in his usual hotel residence, but following the news of Cunill and other Requeté leaders having been captured he realized the danger and after few days went into hiding by his relatives in Barcelona. He refused to flee the Republican zone, since he considered it a treason to Traditionalist cause. Confronted with a tragic choice between two bad options he preferred to face whatever the future brings. In early August the Valls committee of Milícies Antifeixistes launched their search of the Carlist leader. Having intercepted Caylà's correspondence they learnt his whereabouts and a dedicated militia detachment was sent to Barcelona on a capture mission. In mid-August Caylà was arrested in his hideout, driven by car to Valls and executed on Plaça del Pati immediately after arrival. According to some accounts, the Republicans staged sort of a feast afterwards with locals forced to pass by his corpse; according to the other, militiamen used his cut off head as a football.

== Legacy ==
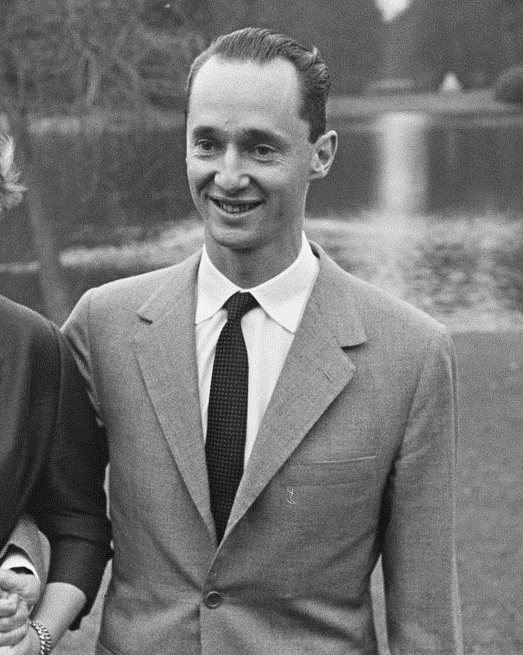
Don Carlos Hugo, 1964

Already during the Civil War Caylà was commemorated in a hagiographical booklet published in 1938, presenting him as champion of the Catholic, national and anti-bolshevik cause. Following the nationalist conquest of Catalonia in 1939 Caylà and other executed or fallen vallencs were re-buried in the newly constructed Panteó dels Mártirs on the Valls cemetery. A street in the old town was named after him and it remains so until today. In the 1940s Caylà remained a hero of the Tarragona Carlists, serving as a role model for the branch opposing Francoism and for those who chose to side with the regime, supporting the claim of self-styled claimant Carlos VIII. Juventud, the Falangist weekly launched in Tarragona in 1943 was styled as continuation of Joventut; issued in Spanish and subtitled Semanario nacional sindicalista it had little in common with the original Caylà's periodical.

Except singular cases of homage on part of intransigent anti-Francoist Sivattistas the memory of Caylà went into oblivion; he started to figure prominently in the Carlist political discourse some time in the late 1960s. At that time the progressist supporters of socialismo autogestionario, grouped around the young Carlist prince Carlos Hugo, launched their bid to take control of the movement. Their political vision was supported by an attempt to re-define Carlist history as popular social struggle, with genuine Carlists pitted against aristocratic, clerical and conservative aliens who infiltrated into the party; Caylà started to serve as an exemplary case of a genuine, tolerant, humanist, progressist, democratic, proto-socialist, anti-capitalist and popular Carlist. His second biography - also highly hagiographical, though pursuing the opposite vision than the earlier one - was published in 1997 and it fits into this progressist outlook well; also some fiercely anti-capitalist, anti-globalist groupings of Spanish or Catalan extreme Left keep presenting Caylà as their predecessor. Other militantly Left-wing groups keep considering Cayla an enemy; carrer Tomàs Caylà is covered by a present-day initiative to purge Catalan public space of fascist heritage. The Traditionalists failed to reclaim the memory of Caylà, though during the transición period of the late 1970s it was the post-Francoist Fuerza Nueva grouping which hailed Caylà as “la moral del Alzamiento”.

== See also ==
- Carlism
- Catalanism
- Fiesta patronal
