= Lorenzo Alier Cassi =

Spanish politician (1878–1942)

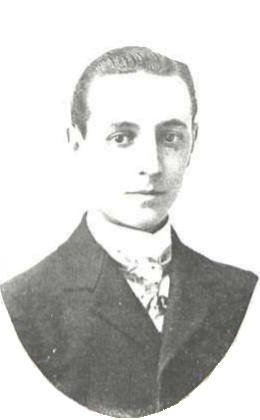
- Born: Lorenzo Alier Cassi; 1878; Barcelona, Spain
- Died: 1942 (aged 63–64); Barcelona, Spain
- Occupations: lawyer, entrepreneur
- Known for: politician
- Political party: Comunión Tradicionalista

Lorenzo María Alier Cassi (1878–1942) was a Spanish Catalan lawyer and politician. In jurisprudence he is known as the author and co-author of few encyclopedic works and as dean of the Barcelona Colegio de Abogados in 1939–1942. In politics he remained a Carlist throughout all his life. In 1907-1910 he served one term in the lower chamber of the Cortes, and in 1934-1936 he was leader of the regional Catalan branch of the Carlist organization, Comunión Tradicionalista.

== Family and youth ==
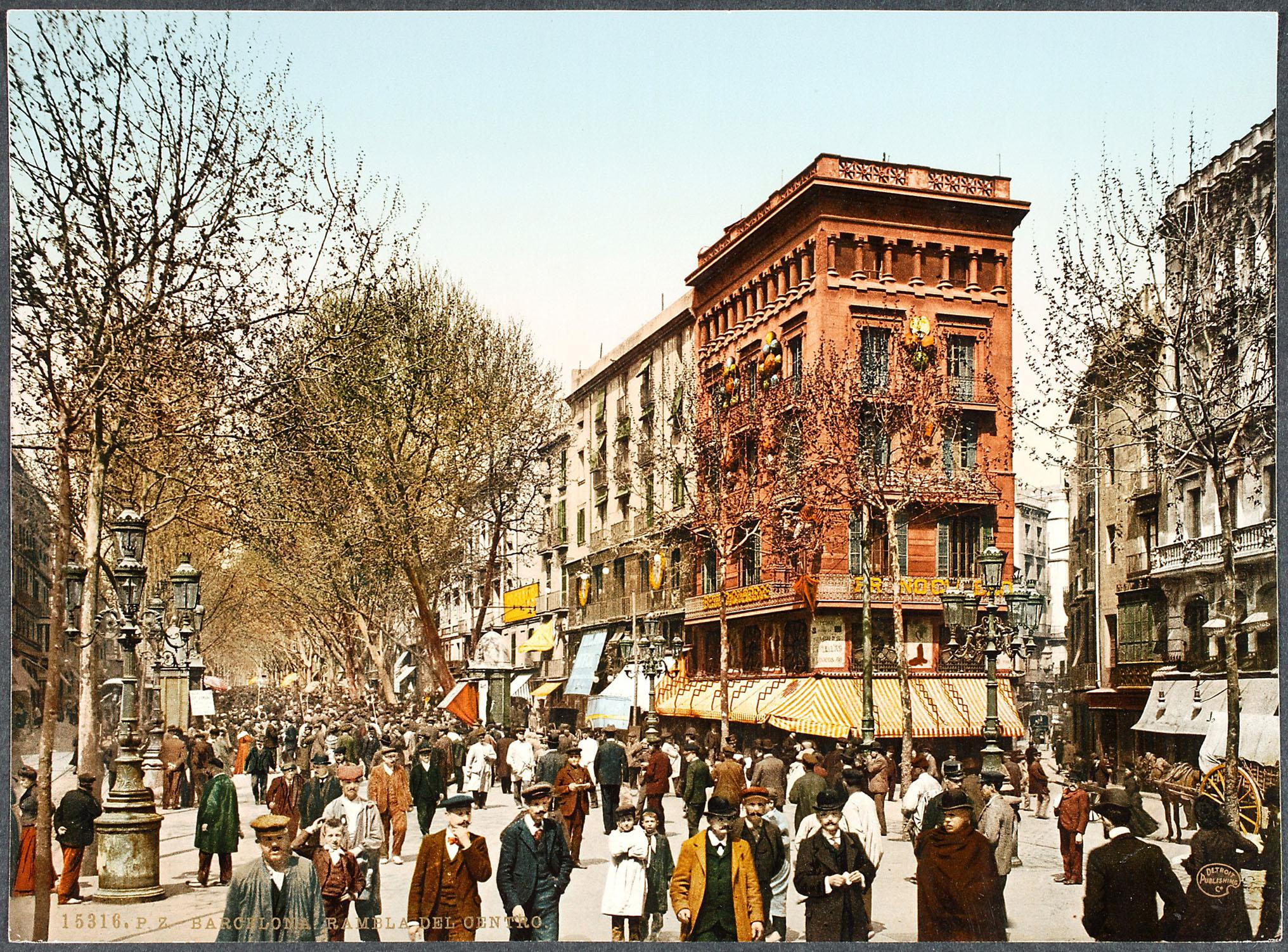
Barcelona, 1880s

Lorenzo M. Alier Cassi descended from a bourgeoisie Catalan family. His paternal grandfather Lorenzo Alier originated from Vich but he settled in Barcelona and briefly served as corregidor in alcaldia of the city; however, he made his name mostly as an entrepreneur. He owned a mid-size Barcelona metalworking company, which specialized in casting and manufacture of iron products; its business climax fell on the mid-19th century. Following his premature death the enterprise was inherited by his son and Alier Cassi's father, Lorenzo Alier Sala (1845-1911), though it seems that in the 1860s the business was rather managed by his relatives and went into decline; in the 1880s “Alier y Compañia” faced legal problems yet it continued to operate.

Alier Sala early engaged in the legitimist cause; in the late 1860s he set up Amigos del Pueblo, a society intended to counter secular influence, and founded a weekly of the same name; in 1872 he published El Partido carlista y la revolución española, a Traditionalist political pamphlet. Already prior to the Third Carlist War he had to flee Spain; during the warfare he served in the Carlist Cuerpo de Administración Militár. Following the legitimist defeat he spent a brief spell on exile in France and then returned to Barcelona. At the turn of the centuries he grew to high positions in the Catalan Carlist structures; as treasurer he became member of the regional executive and vice-president of Círculo Tradicionalista of the city, noted also as “fundador é impulsor de muchas sociedades y periódicos”. He continued operating the metalworking manufacture and got involved in insurance business.

Alier Sala married María Gracia Cassí (died 1924); close to nothing is known of her or her family. The couple had 6 children, of whom Lorenzo was the oldest one. None of the sources consulted provides any details on his early education; at unspecified time though probably in the late 1890s he commenced law studies at the Barcelona University. He graduated shortly before or in 1901, as this is the year when Alier Cassi entered Colegio de Abogados of Barcelona and started practicing.

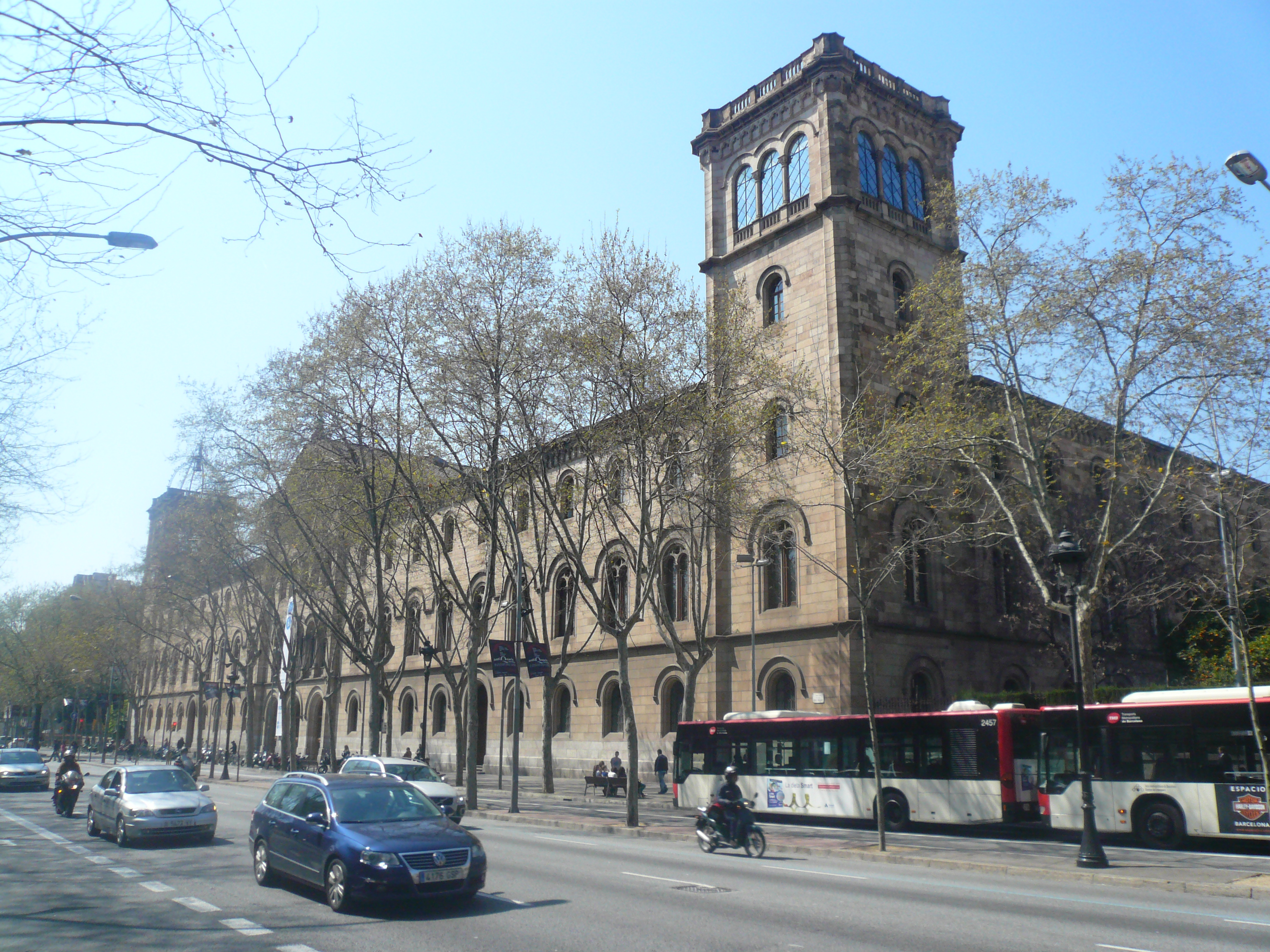
Barcelona University, current view

At unspecified time though prior to 1912 Alier Cassi married Rosa Espada y Bertrán (died 1926); there is no closer information on her or her family available. The couple settled in Barcelona and had 7 children, born between 1912 and the early 1920s. None of them became a public figure; the third son José María died in infancy, while his two older brothers Lorenzo and Antonio Alier Espada, in the Republic days engaged in Carlist politics, were executed by the Republicans during the Civil War; the only son who – like his 3 sisters - outlived his father was the youngest one, also José María. The best known of Alier Cassi's grandchildren is María Rosa Millet Alier, a publisher and translator; two grandsons practiced as recognized Barcelona dentists. A paternal uncle of Alier Cassi, Andreu Alier Sala, was a locally known poet, associated with vigatanisme.

== Early public career ==
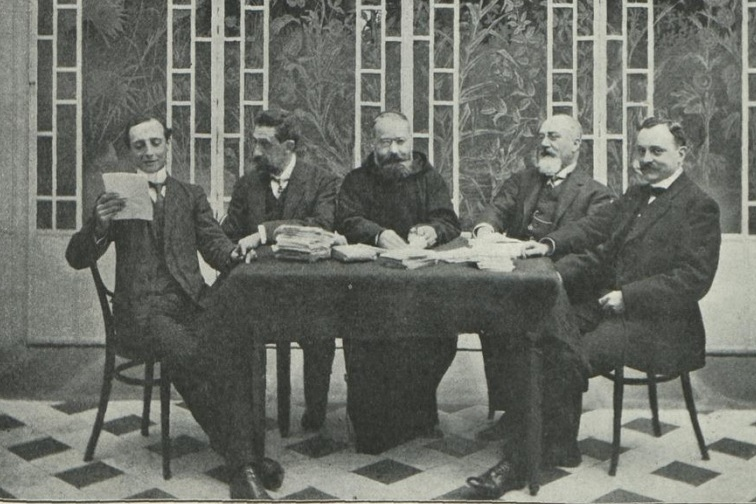
Alier (1fL) among Catalan cultural pundits in jury of writing contest, 1907

Alier Cassi was raised in a Carlist family; he inherited his Traditionalist political outlook from his father, witnessed his political engagements, and was growing up in a house visited by Catalan Carlist heavyweights. He got involved in party politics as a teenager and himself was first noted in 1898, when delivering an address during inauguration of a Carlist circle in the town of Castellar del Vallés. In 1902, at an unusually early age of 24, he became secretary of the Carlist regional Catalan executive, a nominally technical position which however placed him in the centre of regional party politics. In 1904 he served as vice-president of the Barcelona branch of Juventud Carlista. According to some authors he was climbing the party hierarchy ladder fast and already in the mid-1900s grew to president of Círculo Tradicionalista de Barcelona; the information is by no means certain as other sources suggest that the person in question might have been rather his father, also “Lorenzo Alier”.

In the mid-1900s the Catalan Carlists were divided by the question of would-be partnership with republicans and nationalists; the coalition, named Solidaritat Catalana, was supposed to oppose government-sponsored legislation which curtailed some press liberties and in the region was widely perceived as aimed against Catalonia. Eventually the Traditionalists joined the Solidaritat electoral alliance prior to the 1907 elections. In unclear circumstances Alier Cassi, at the time a relatively junior party politician known mostly as the son of his father, was nominated by the Carlist regional jefatura to run for the Cortes ticket in Cervera, where he stood as a joint Solidaritat candidate. His bid proved hugely successful, as Alier smashed the conservative candidate Rafael Roig Torres and gathered 99,62% of all votes cast, enjoying support of 56,63% of all these entitled to vote. In the chamber Alier joined the 14-member Carlist minority yet he remained a rather passive MP; neither the official Cortes service nor the press of the era listed his name in relation to any legislation or debate.

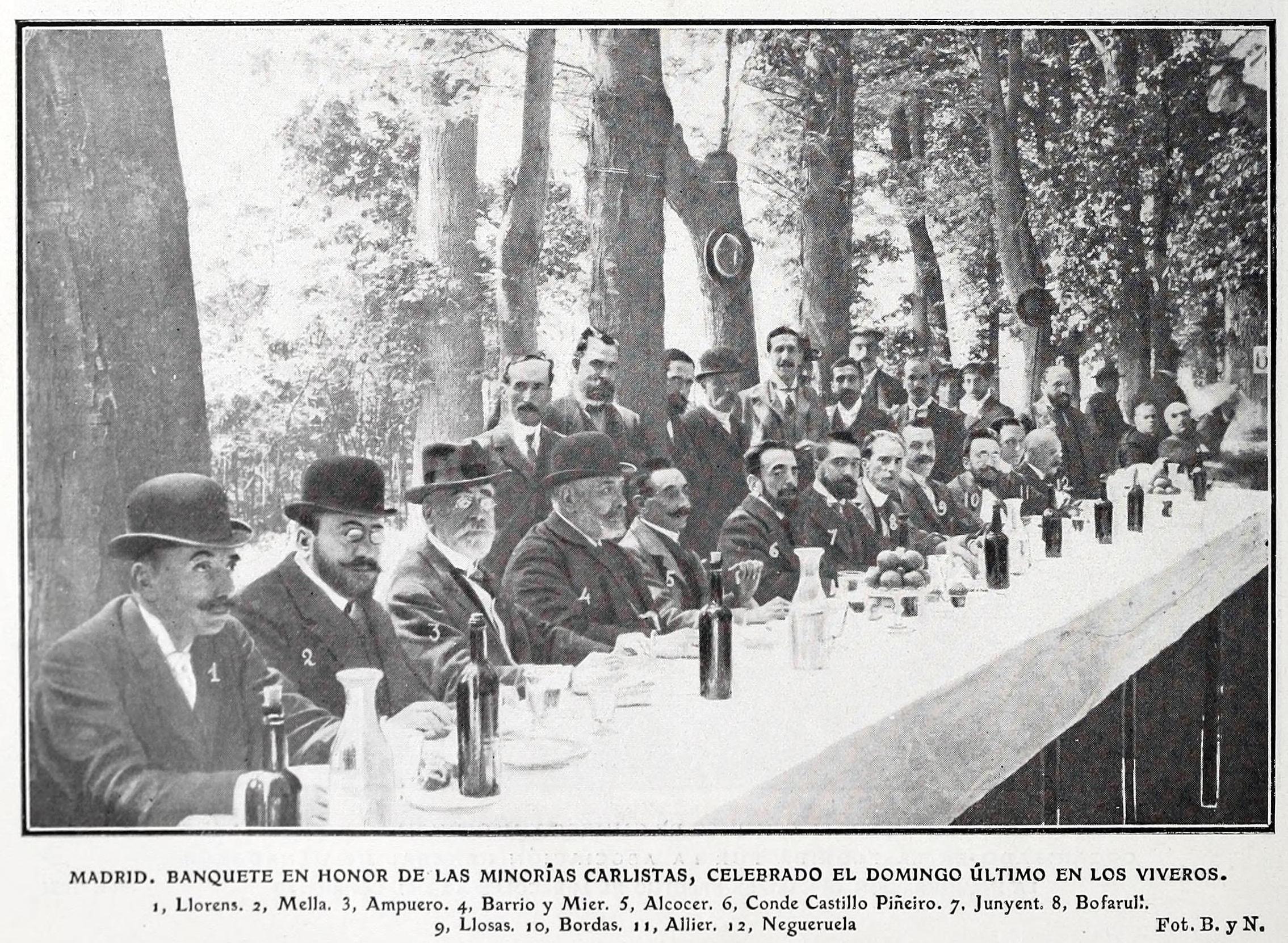
Alier at a Carlist banquete, 1907

As member of the Carlist parliamentary contingent Alier came to know nationwide party moguls; according to some sources he even befriended two consecutive formal party leaders, Matías Barrio Mier and Bartolomé Feliú Pérez, and the key party theorist, Juan Vázquez de Mella. In 1909 he took part in funeral of Barrio; a few times he took part in other Traditionalist rallies, be it in Catalonia or far beyond it, e.g. in Madrid or in the Basque Zumarraga. The same year the Carlist Catalan leader, Erasmo Janer Gironella, appointed him member of Junta Regional; it is not clear whether his father resigned or whether the two formed a fairly unique case of the father and the son serving in the Carlist regional executive. However, Alier Cassi was only moderately involved in politics and tended to focus rather on his juridical career. When his Cortes term expired in 1910 he chose not to stand for re-election; as it would turn out in the future, he thus terminated his parliamentary career.

== Political detachment ==
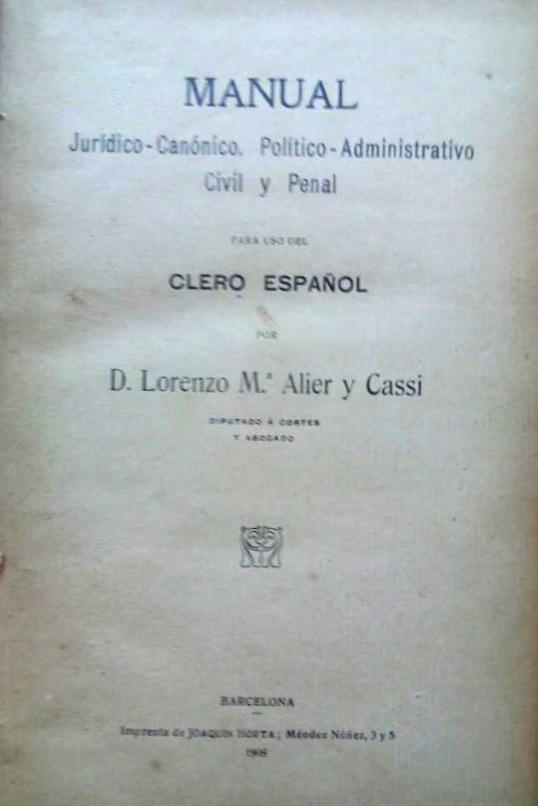
Manual jurídico-canónico

In the late 1900s Alier kept practicing as a Barcelona lawyer and specialized in canon law. He gained his name also as a theorist of jurisprudence; in 1909 he published Manual jurídico-canónico, político-administrativo, civil y penal, a popular textbook and practical guidance intended for the Roman Catholic clergy. In the early 1910s he joined a large group of lawyers, including most distinguished academic professors, who co-edited Enciclopedia Jurídica Española. The 30-volume publication was advertised as a compendium of “toda la legislación de España” until the date and was continued with additional appendices and update volumes for few years to come. Alier's scientific career was crowned in 1912, when in Madrid he obtained PhD in Derecho y Ciencias Sociales.

There is very little information on Alier's activity during the late 1910s. Though he remained marginally involved in Traditionalist cultural rather than political activity and at times spoke at Jaimista rallies with the likes of Luis Hernando de Larramendi or Bartolomé Trías, no historiographic work dealing with Carlism of the late Restoration mentions his name, be it as a protagonist or even as a minor figure. It is not entirely clear whether during the 1919 Mellista breakup Alier joined the breakaways; one source claims he remained loyal to the Carlist claimant, Don Jaime. He was occasionally noted in societé columns as a prestigious practicing lawyer with office at Calle Vilamari; at times he was acknowledged as participant in religious ceremonies, e.g. in 1918 when taking part in assumption of duties of a new canónigo, Carlos Cardó. Alier moderately engaged in charity, e.g. in 1920 he served as president of Asociación pro espectáculos cinematogáficos gratuitos para niños.

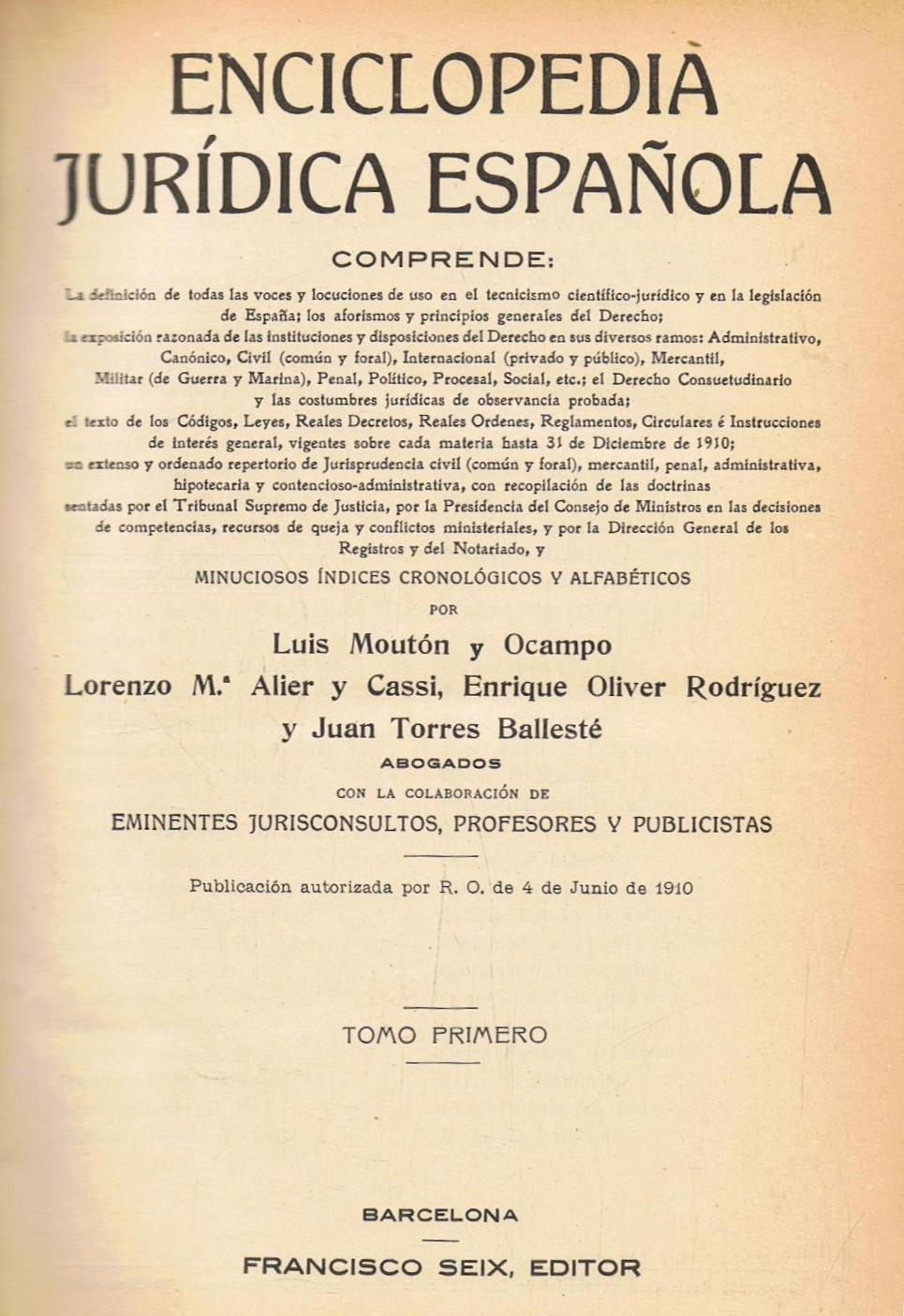
Enciclopedia Jurídica

Apart from his professional engagements as a lawyer Alier continued his inherited metalworking business, yet in the early 1920s it was already close to failure. At least in 1922-1923 he was seeking capitalization of the company and repeatedly advertised in the press; at one point he set up a new company and tried to attract new business partners. It is not clear whether these efforts produced any outcome; since the mid-1920s there is no further information on the Alier metalworking manufacture being operational. In the early 1920s Alier travelled to Cuba; neither the purpose nor the result of this journey are known. There is no information on his activities between 1924 and 1929; though a former MP, known lawyer and co-author of juridical scientific works, he was not a single time mentioned in the Catalan or Spanish press of the period. His whereabouts are unclear and it is not at all certain whether at the time he resided in Spain.

== Return to politics ==
Carlist standard

Alier re-emerged in politics during the final months of Berenguer's dictablanda; in February 1931 he entered the re-constituted Carlist Junta Regional. There is very little information on his activity during the early Republican period and it seems that he was a rather passive member of the executive; he is neither mentioned by historiographic works on Carlism which cover the 1931-1932 period nor listed in the press. It is not clear what was his position versus issues the party had to face, like the question of Catalan autonomy. However, some sources suggest that he represented the line close to this pursued by the regional leader Miguel Junyent; it steered clear of sectarian intransigence, let alone conspiracy and violence.

In mid-1933 Junyent resigned, embittered with radical opposition he faced within the regional party ranks. The claimant Alfonso Carlos replaced him with representative of the intransigents, Mauricio de Sivatte, yet the issue is not clear. Some authors claim that due to internal opposition Sivatte has never fully taken over or that he exercised his jefatura provisionally; others maintain that the moderates stroke back and convinced their king to revert to previous line, this time represented by Alier. His official nomination as the Catalan Carlist jefé came in March 1934.

During his tenure Alier had to carry out major re-organisation of Catalan Carlist structures, ordered for the entire party by its new nationwide executive. Revamp of female branch proved easy, but integration of Requeté militia into the nationwide framework caused significant resistance; Alier overcame it with a number of firm circulars. In debate over a monarchical alliance Alier sided with opponents of any deal with the Alfonsinos, though it seems that his position was highly influenced by Sivatte. When enforcing this strategy he had to confront local fronda, headed by Joaquín Bau, but enjoyed full support of the claimant. In early 1935 he presided over a Traditionalist Week in Catalonia, yet he relatively seldom appeared on party rallies. During his jefatura Alier remained an administrator rather than a genuine leader; major rehaul of Catalan structures, carried out in late 1935, was driven by the national party jefé Manuel Fal; Alier's role was this of executing the process agreed.

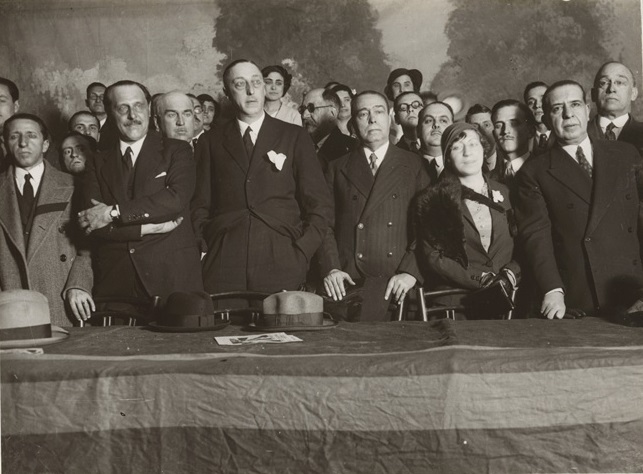
Carlist rally, Barcelona, 1930s

In late 1935 Alier grew tired of constant political strife and handed over his resignation; the claimant agreed, though he asked him to carry on until after the 1936 elections. He also nominated Alier to Consejo de Comunión Tradicionalista, a newly formed 5-member advisory body supposed to assist Fal Conde; at this position he supported the regentialist solution, contemplated by Don Alfonso Carlos. A “Lorenzo Alier” was initially anticipated to join La alianza de las derechas and run for the Cortes in February 1936, yet it is not clear whether the person in question was Alier Cassi or his son, Alier Espada; in any case the candidature has been eventually dropped from the list. In late February 1936 his resignation was made public; as Catalan Carlist jefé Alier was replaced by Tomás Cayla.

== Civil War and afterwards ==
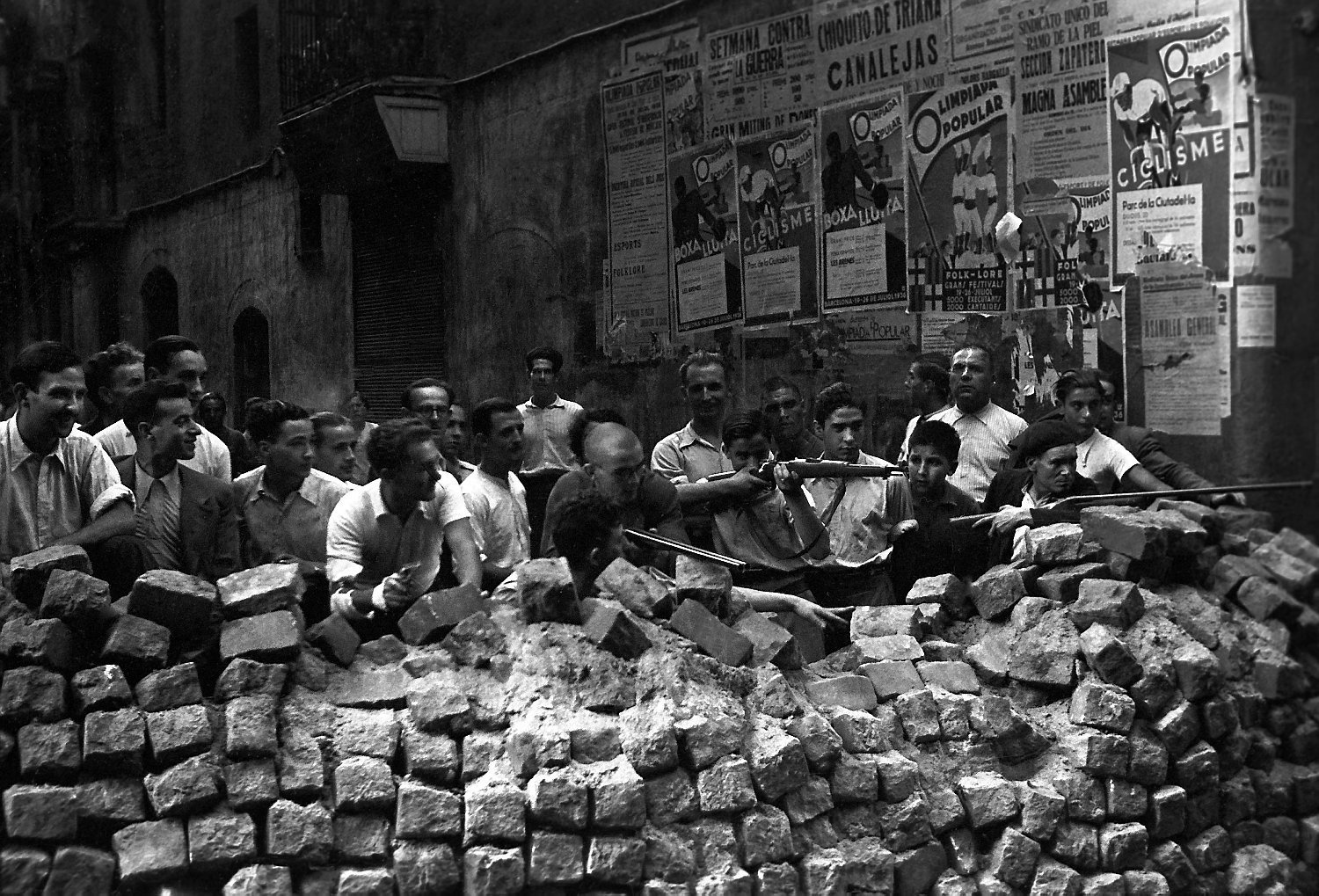
Barcelona, July 1936

According to one scholar Alier was involved in the Carlist conspiracy against the Republic; in immediate aftermath of the February 1936 elections he reportedly remained in touch with military conspirators from UME and spent 3 days in his secret headquarters waiting for the order to rise. Details of his possible engagement in the conspiracy which eventually produced the July Coup are not available. His two sons were detained, but it is not known whether Alier Cassi shared their fate or whether he was in Barcelona at all; a later press note claimed that he “saw his son die” but made no references to his own incarceration. According to a vague press note Alier “miraculously escaped” death and went into hiding into an unnamed village, where he spent most of the war until arrival of the Nationalist troops.

In February 1939, shortly after the Nationalist takeover of Catalonia, the fellow Carlist and the Nationalist minister of justice at the time, Conde de Rodezno, nominated Alier the dean of the Barcelona Colegio de Abogados. His activity at this position is subject to conflicting accounts. According to a historiographic study Alier at least formally authorised purges among the city lawyers and worked to build the new Francoist juridical infrastructure. In November 1939 he created Comisión de Abogados Ex-Combatientes y Ex-Cautivos, a sub-section of the corporation; its objective was to build sort of a trusted elite of lawyers, who would later enjoy various types of privileges, including financial ones. He also issued circulars which noted that lawyers “supportive of democratic ideas, incompatible with the new [Francoist] state, should be repealed”. On the other hand, according to a press note from the 1950s “la justicia se cumplió en el Colegio de Abogados serenamente, sin asomo de venganza” and Alier acted on St. Augustin's principle that wounds can not be healed with violence.

There is scarcely any other information on Alier's activity after 1939. According to one source he emerged from the war as already broken, prematurely aged old man, plunged into deep depression by death of his two oldest sons. He did not engage in political activity again, be it in Carlist of Francoist ranks. Apart from professional activity in Colegio he limited his public appearances to religious events, at times flavored with Traditionalism, e.g. in 1940 he was noted as taking part in a sermon to honor the Traditionalist dead. His own death was barely noticed in the press, acknowledged in few Barcelona and Madrid papers.

== See also ==
- Carlism
- Traditionalism (Spain)
