= Manuel Fal Conde =

Spanish Catholic activist and Carlist politician

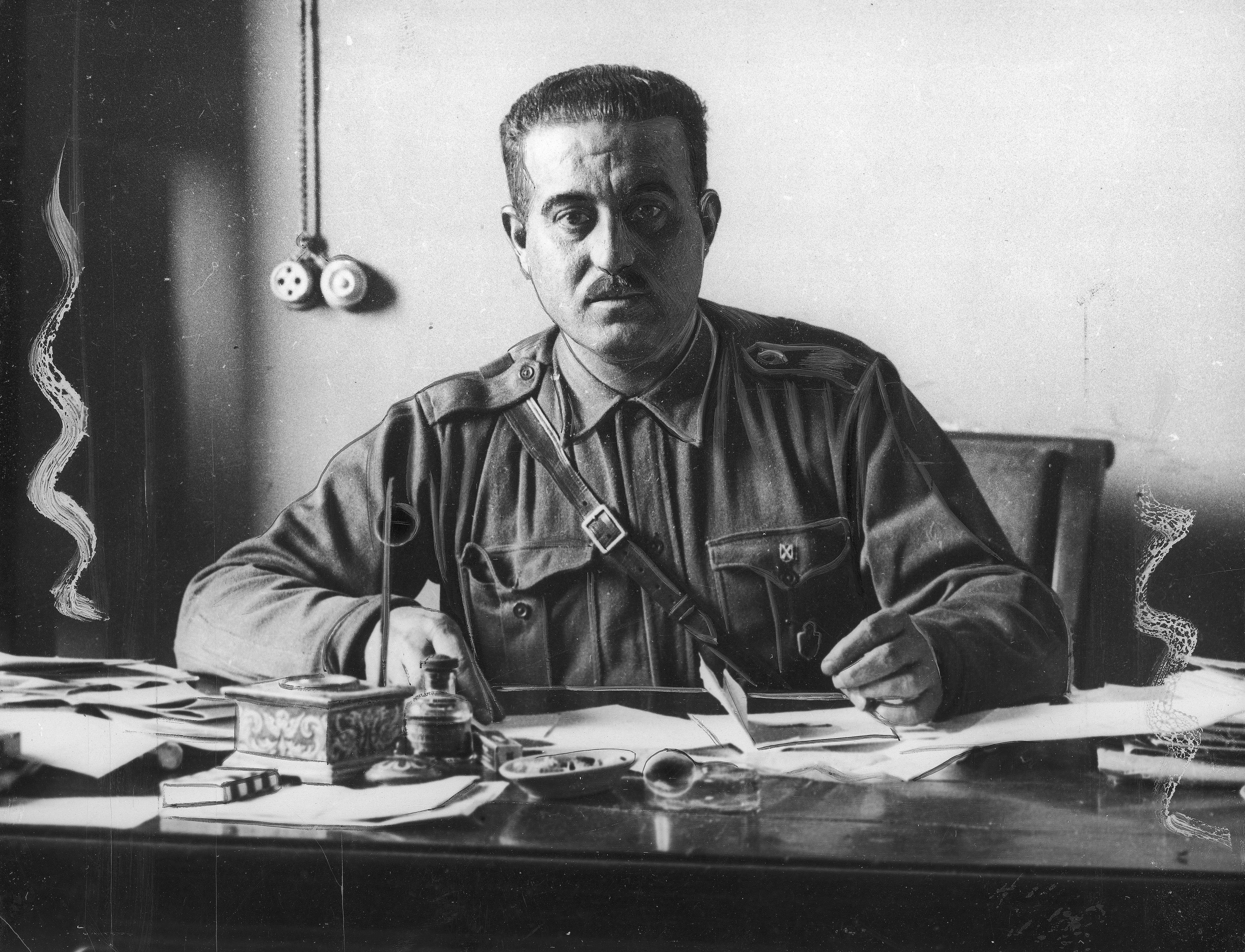
- Fal Conde in Toledo, 1936
- Born: Manuel Fal Conde; 10 August 1894; Higuera de la Sierra, Kingdom of Spain
- Died: 20 May 1975 (aged 80); Seville, Francoist Spain
- Occupation: Lawyer
- Known for: Political leadership
- Political party: Carlism

Manuel Fal Conde, 1st Duke of Quintillo (10 August 1894 – 20 May 1975) was a Spanish Catholic activist and a Carlist politician. He is recognized as a leading figure in the history of Carlism, serving as its political leader for over 20 years (1934–1955) and heading the movement during one of its most turbulent periods. Initially he led the belligerent faction pressing anti-Republican insurgency; during the Spanish Civil War he joined the Nationalists; later on he championed the anti-Francoist strategy.

== Family and youth ==
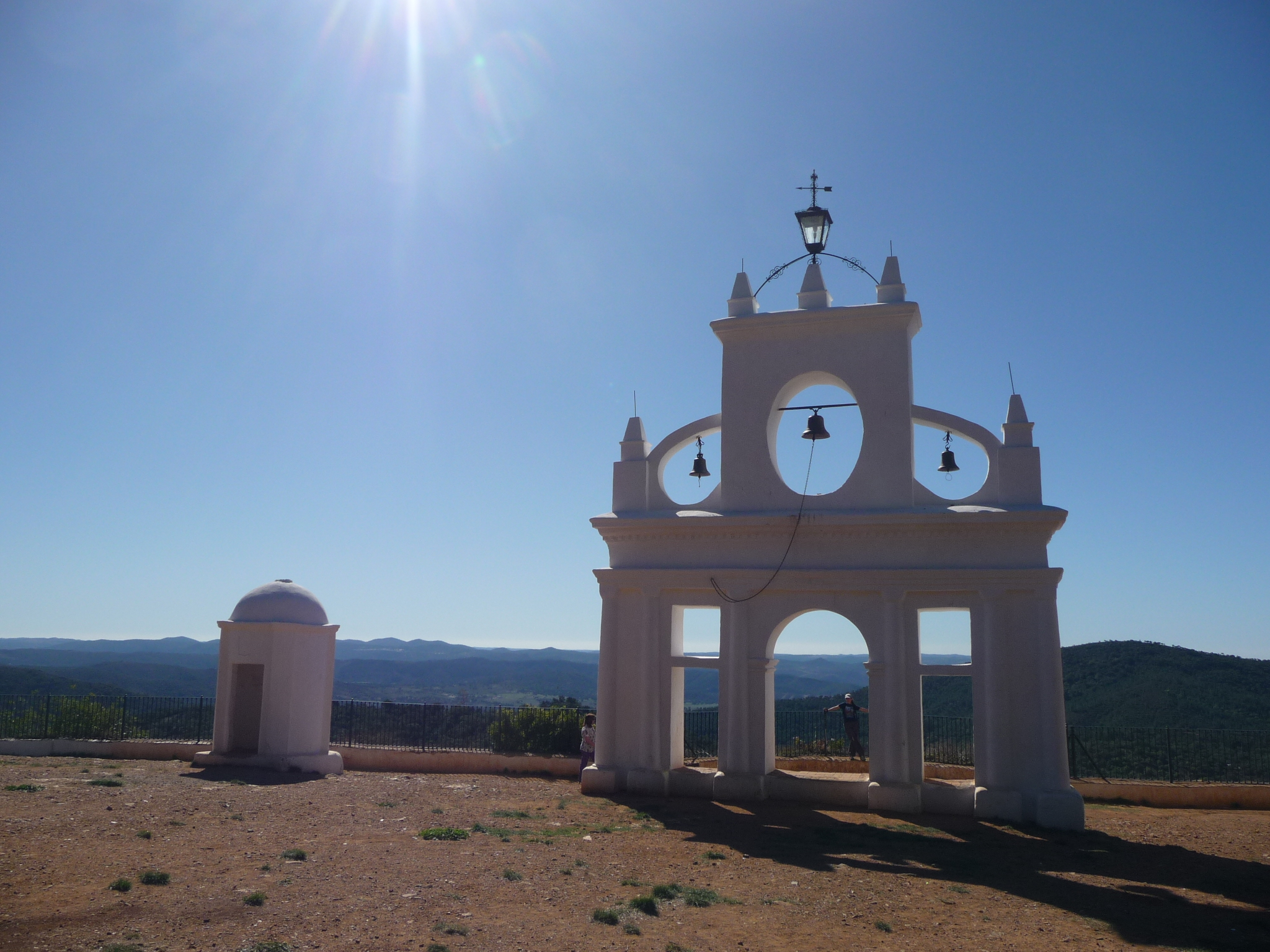
Sierra de Aracena, Huelva province

Manuel Lorenzo José Fal Conde descended from an upper-class family originating from Asturias; it is not clear when the family settled in Higuera de la Sierra, a small town in the Andalusian province of Huelva. Although many of his ancestors were connected with medicine, his father, Domingo Fal Sánchez (1857-1926), practiced as an oculist, ran a small workshop producing cork utilities and served as alcalde of Higuera between 1900 and 1905; also later on Domingo Fal exercised influence on Higuera's life. He married a local girl, María Josefa Conde; the couple lived in a building housing also the workshop. The couple had four children, Manuel was the youngest and his mother died 13 days after giving birth to him. The widowed sister of Domingo helped to look after the four children, raising them in a fervently Catholic ambience.

Manuel's formal education began in the Extremaduran town of Villafranca de los Barros where he entered the local Jesuit college joining his two older brothers who were already pursuing their studies at the college. The Jesuit education proved crucial in Manuel's formative years. It was Gabino Márquez, the Villafranca scholar of biblical studies, papal teaching and pedagogy, who paid particular attention to the Manuel, who he considered a promising pupil. Following his bachillerato obtained in 1911 the young man entered the Jesuit novitiate, but he changed his mind and began to consider the study of medicine. His father dissuaded him as his older brother, Domingo, was already pursuing that path; eventually Manuel commenced law studies in Seville.

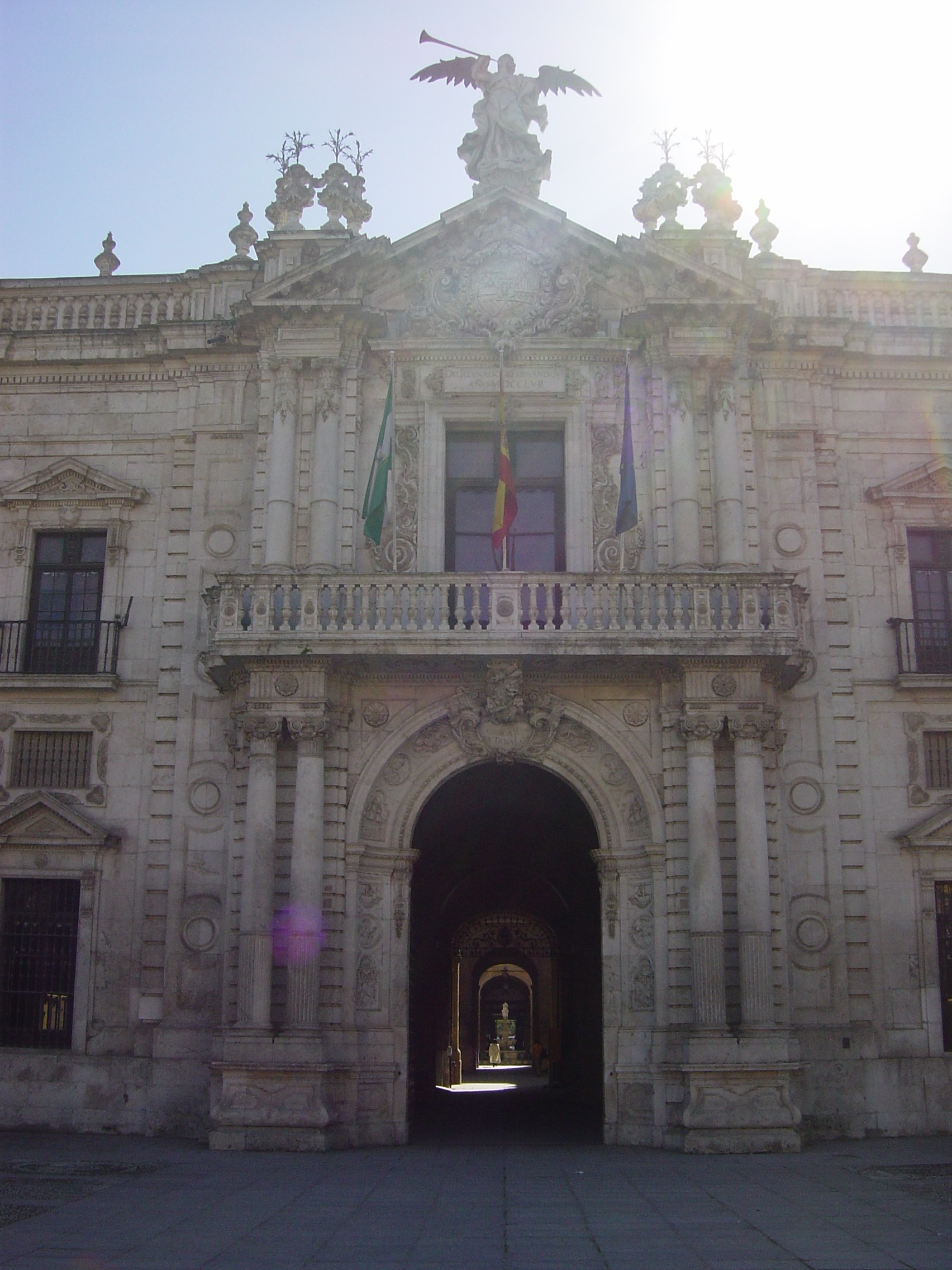
University of Seville

At Universidad Hispalense Manuel was drawn to a circle of Manuel Sanchez de Castro, a Carlist, professor of natural law and moving spirit behind the emergence of militant Catholicism in Seville. He graduated and passed his licenciado in 1916; following a year in Madrid he obtained the grade of a doctor. In 1917 he served as soldier in the de cuota and in 1918 he entered Colegio de Abogados de Sevilla. Following a brief internship Fal Conde opened his own office on José Gestoso street. In parallel to his law practice Fal Conde commenced his brief teaching and academic career. He taught history, law and ethics at the Jesuit college of Villasis in Seville. At Universidad Hispalense he worked in the department of procedural law while pursuing research on the history of Spanish political law. He also briefly managed a car dealership.

In 1922 Fal Conde married María de los Reyes Macias Aguilar (1904-1975), a native of nearby Sanlucar. The newlyweds initially settled in Seville on Miguel del Cid street. The couple had seven children, born between 1923 and 1938. Some were active as Traditionalist militants during the Francoist period and also in the 1970s, opposing the socialist bid of Don Carlos Hugo. Three of his sons, José Maria, Alfonso and Domingo Fal-Conde Macias were present as supporters of Don Sixto during the Montejurra incidents of 1976. In the 1980s Domingo Fal-Conde Macias served as head of Comunión Tradicionalista Carlista, a new united Carlist organization.

== Early public career ==
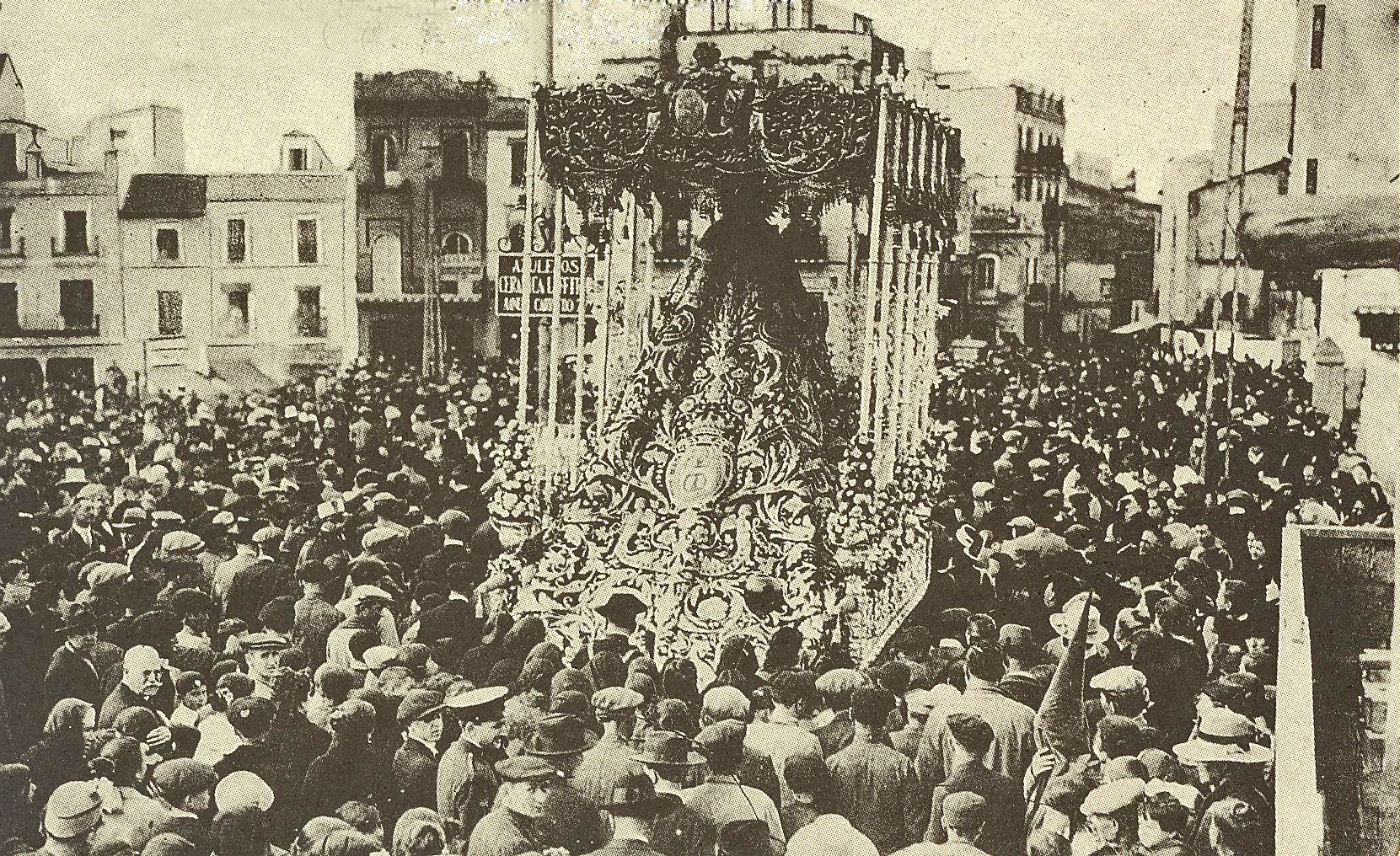
Semana Santa, Seville, around 1915

It is not clear whether there were any Carlist antecedents among the ancestors of Fal Conde; some authors claim that there was none, while others quote his family as exemplary case of Carlism having been transmitted from generation to generation as sort of a genetic code. It is known that Fal Conde's father was a devout Catholic, but none of the sources consulted provides clear information of what exactly his political outlook was. It is possible that Traditionalist views were, if not reinforced, then implanted in the young Fal Conde during his education. At the turn of the century the Jesuits were clearly sympathizing with Ramón Nocedal and his Integrist vision of religion and Traditionalism; it is likely that his Villafranca years affected Fal Conde accordingly. He admitted juvenile fascination with an address delivered to the college audience by Manuel Senante, at that time one of key Integrist politicians. Militant Catholicism of Manuel Sánchez de Castro is likely to have contributed further on, forming the young Fal Conde as an energetic Catholic activist, possibly along the intransigent and ultra-reactionary Integrist lines.

Fal Conde commenced his public assignments during his academic years in Seville; he joined Asociación Escolar Sevillana and soon grew to be its president; the organization remained a fairly typical student group, though politically it tended towards "catolicismo político y social", flavored by Traditionalism in general and by pro-German World War I stand in particular. Following his return from Madrid he started contributing to local Catholic periodicals. In the 1920s he excelled in various Catholic organizations, ranging from educational associations to charity groups to trade unions to penitentiary circles, like Congregación de los Luises, Conferencias de San Vicente de Paulo, various Hermandades de Penitencia, the Jesuit-sponsored Patronato para Obreros, the Franciscan-sponsored Compañía de las Hermanas de la Cruz and a number of others. He also launched some initiatives himself, like the 1924-inaugurated Romería de la Reina de los Ángeles on the Peña de Arias Montano in Alájar. Exposure to a variety of structures provided Fal Conde with experience and confirmed his enormous capacity as an organizer.

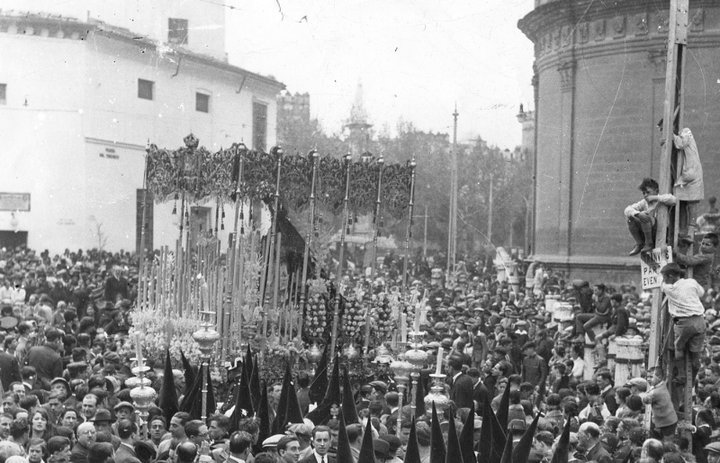
Semana Santa, Seville, 1928

It is not clear whether during late Restoration or during the Primo de Rivera dictatorship Fal Conde was active in the Integrist ranks. When discussing his post-1931 activity, present-day scholars almost unanimously refer to him as to a former Integrist or even more explicitly as to "antiguo militante del Partido Integrista", though none provides detailed information on his engagement in any party initiatives of the 1920s. When reporting on Fal Conde's activities in 1930, the Integrist daily El Siglo Futuro referred to him as "queridísimo amigo nuestro de Sevilla", which suggests that he might have indeed co-operated with Integrism in general and the newspaper in particular also earlier on, especially that he displayed a particular knack for journalism: he is known to have contributed to various press titles before 1923, launched his own daily later and was correspondent of El Siglo Futuro in the early 1930s.

== Political beginnings ==
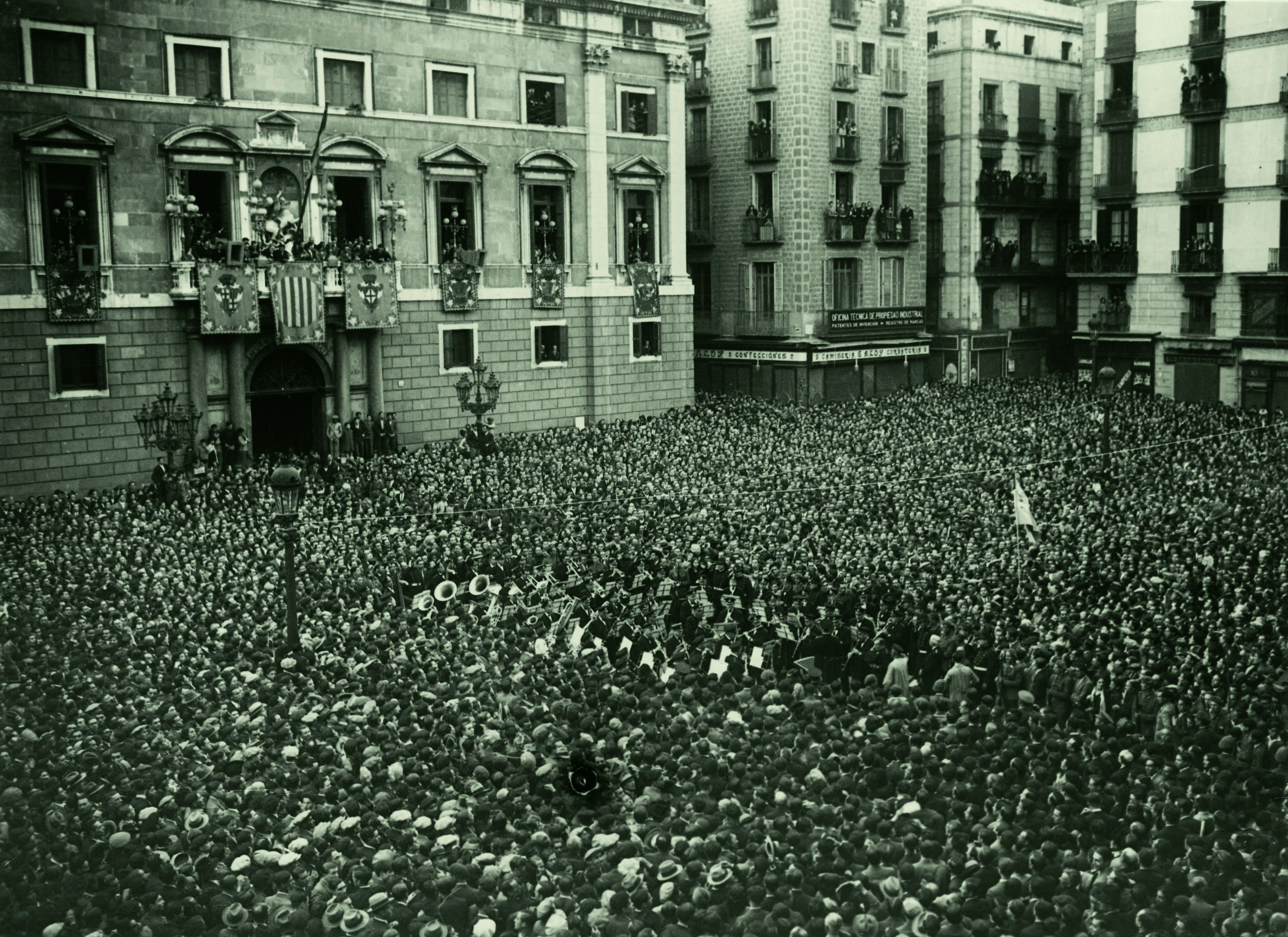
Republic declared, 1931

Fal Conde, who later confessed to approaching politics as Christian responsibility and a call from God, was first recorded as engaged in a political enterprise in the spring of 1930. He was among members of Junta Organizadora of Partido Tradicionalista-Integrista, a new post-dictatorial incarnation of Integrism, and emerged as leader of the Seville branch of the party. In late 1930 he was also busy co-organizing local branches of Juventud Integrista. Fal Conde witnessed emergence of militantly secular Republic with horror; he personally led local Juventud organization trying to protect the Seville churches against violence which erupted in May 1931. In June 1931 he ran for Cortes from Cádiz; the bid proved unsuccessful. According to a homage publication Fal gained enough votes to be voted in, but it was behind-the-stage manipulations which relegated him to non-electable position; embittered, he has never run for the Cortes again. Instead, he focused on a newly acquired daily, El Observador, re-launched as an ultraconservative Catholic title in Seville, apart from contributing to other local periodicals.

In early 1932 the Integrists re-united with Carlism in Comunión Tradicionalista. Fal Conde was entrusted the West-Andalusian jefatura and together with provincial leaders achieved remarkable success implanting Traditionalism where it was hardly popular. Characteristic feature of his leadership was – even in comparison to other Carlist leaders - unveiled hostility towards the Republic. Fal Conde remained enthusiastic about co-operation with Sanjurjo; Andalusia was where the coup was most welcomed by local Carlists. In the aftermath Fal was arrested for 3 months, which did not discourage him from sounding other military on leading a potential Carlist rising. Also his El Observador kept making references to violence. Two other specific features of Andalusian Carlism were impact on Catholic youth and initiatives targeting the urban working-class. In many Andalusian districts Carlism emerged as an exclusively youth movement, which in the spring of 1933 pushed Fal Conde to create a federation of local Juventud circles. Acute social problems in turn induced Fal Conde to set up fairly successful Workers Section in early 1933.

Quintillo,1934

Fal Conde gained nationwide attention following the Zumarraga act; in recognition of his excellent organization skills in November 1933 Alfonso Carlos nominated Fal Jefe Regional for all Andalusia, but the most impressive coup was yet to come: in April 1934 regional Carlism organized a massive gathering at Quintillo estate near Seville. This demonstration of local prowess climaxed in parade of 650 uniformed and trained Requetés, which made a stunning impact on guests from other regions. When national leadership of Conde Rodezno was called into question due to rapprochement with the Alfonsists and his gradualist strategy, Fal Conde became one of top contenders for the job. Alfonso Carlos, himself sympathetic to Integrism and personally familiar with Fal Conde since late Restoration, seemed well-disposed. In May 1934, despite his relatively young age and unenthusiastic welcome from Carlist stronghold, Navarre, Fal Conde was nominated Secretary General of the Comunión. El Siglo Futuro hailed him as "Sevillian Zumalacárregui" and Carlist youth welcomed him as the man who "brought Montejurra to Andalusia". An apologetic biography followed.

== Jefe ==
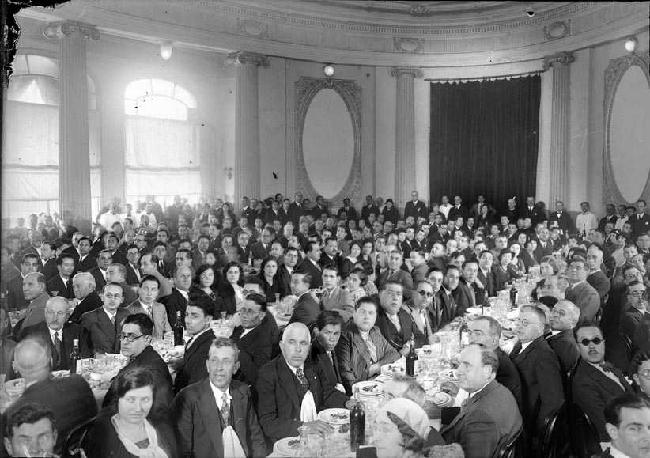
Carlist meeting, 1930s

Fal Conde embarked on massive reorganization of Carlist structures. He created five central Delegaciones; Council of Culture and Grand Council. Launch of official Carlist gazette enhanced communication. Most importantly, he detached affiliated organizations from local circulos and joined them in nationwide, parallel, centrally commanded structures. The first remodeled were Requeté and Juventud Tradicionalista, with AET and Margaritas (Carlist feminine organization) somewhat less successful. New affiliated formations were created: urban proletariat was lured to Agrupación Gremial, a Carlist red cross organization emerged as Socorro Blanco and a grouping for younger boys was established as Pelayos. Internal taxation was introduced. Carlist periodicals were co-ordinated within modern propaganda machinery, brought under more discipline in return for financial help.

The change meant vast improvement in terms of steerability, provided critical mass and enhanced homogeneity, though also enforced discipline and laid command of all structures in hands of Fal and his entourage, removing dependence on local juntas and especially on the Vasco-Navarros. The latter complained about "fascistization" of the Comunión, especially that Fal Conde's trusted collaborators were appointed to key positions. Nevertheless, remodeled Comunión was fully able to bear the weight of rapidly expanding ranks; instead of inefficient isolated circulos where zeal of new converts was evaporating, new structures channeled and reinforced enthusiasm. Organization question aside, the change started even to affect the way of life. Comunión began to expand into unlikely areas both geographically and socially; structures were emerging in such regions as Extremadura or the Canaries, while following the example of Western Andalusia, representatives of urban proletariat started to appear in local bodies also elsewhere.

Unlike the Northerners who conceived Traditionalism as rooted in family and regional values, Fal Conde was focused on structures. As alliances were likely to get them dominated by other groupings, victorious campaign – maybe unfeasible as exclusively Carlist affair - should be launched and controlled by Carlists. In line with this vision, under Fal Conde Carlism steered clear of alliances, its strategy dubbed "isolationism" or "exclusiveness". Though he felt compelled to join Renovación Española in National Bloc (the Spanish Right-wing political alliance of the 1930s) late 1934, he made sure the access was as non-committal as possible. In 1935 he grew increasingly skeptical and later that year let Rodezno mix with the Alfonsinos on the private business basis before definitely abandoning the alliance in the spring of 1936. From the onset highly suspicious about CEDA he was more than happy to see it decompose in 1935-6.

Carlist standard

Another shift in Carlist strategy under Fal Conde was de-emphasizing of politics and focusing on organizational buildup, with special attention paid to paramilitary. His vision was already set on violent overthrow of the Republic; starting 1935 openly belligerent language became increasingly common at Carlist rallies, with references to sacrifice, blood, arms, violence and power. Permitting taking part in 1936 elections, Fal Conde did not pay much attention to the campaign. Though Rodeznistas viewed him as an uninspiring, colorless, mediocre bureaucrat, Fal Conde gained recognition bordering devotion among Requeté and the youth. Also Alfonso Carlos seemed perfectly satisfied; in December 1935 he raised Fal Conde from Secretary General to Jefe Delegado.

== Insurgency and unification ==
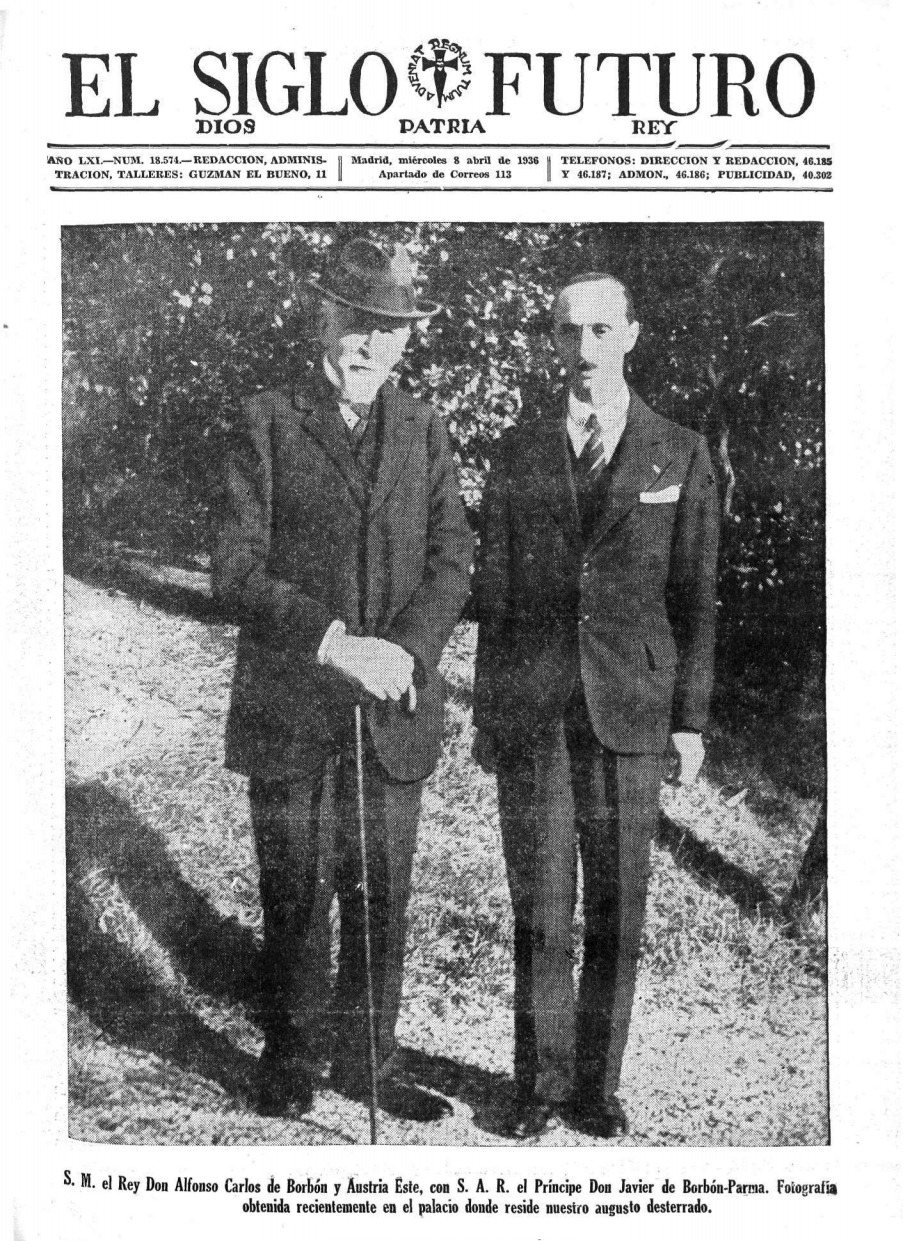
Alfonso Carlos and Don Javier, April 1936

Convinced that in the battle against democracy Carlists must strike first, Fal Conde threw himself into wartime preparations; his initial plan was abandoned in late spring of 1936. He envisaged a purely Carlist insurrection with conditional assistance of the army. Fal Conde placed his bets on Sanjurjo, who agreed to lead the rising. Talks with Mola proved unsuccessful. The general refused to accept Fal Conde's conditions, which aimed at toppling the Republic and installing Traditionalist monarchy. However, Mola opened parallel negotiations with the Navarrese. Led by Rodezno, the latter bypassed Fal Conde and were keen to commit local Requeté to a joint insurgency with almost no strings attached. Though at that point Fal Conde considered dismissing the entire Navarrese junta, he decided not to risk open confrontation; Rodezno and his entourage outmaneuvered him and elicited hesitant approval from the royal envoy, Don Javier.

Upon the outbreak of hostilities Fal Conde headed the new Carlist wartime executive, Junta Nacional Carlista de Guerra, and had to acknowledge that instead of being equal partner, Carlism was getting reduced to a junior role. His position was already precarious. The death of Sanjurjo deprived him of a key ally among the generals. The death of Alfonso Carlos left the movement with no king and made dissent easier. The Navarrese set up their own Junta Central Carlista de Guerra de Navarra, which emerged as a competitive, though theoretically only regional body, and kept bypassing Fal; Carlist executive was decomposing. As Requeté units, the key Carlist argument, unconditionally left at generals’ disposal were dispersed among various fronts, Carlism – in line with Fal Conde's worst nightmares – was indeed getting dominated by its alliance partners. During the outbreak of the Nationalist uprising in Navarre, a mass killing was conducted by the insurgents against all civilian dissidence in the Navarre rearguard, taking a death toll of circa 3,000. Fal Conde's attitude towards the Republicans is subject to conflicting accounts. Some maintain that he was the instigator of bloody repressions, also directed against the clergy with Basque nationalist sympathies, while others claim exactly the opposite, namely that he did his best to prevent executions. Discussion related to the Carlist - and, due to his political leadership, also Fal Conde's personal responsibility for nationalist atrocities committed in the rearguard is not conclusive.

To enhance Carlist position versus the military Fal Conde launched two new projects in November. The first one was Obra Nacional Corporativa, general labor organization, another one was Military Academy, intended to train Carlist command cadres. Uncomfortable with Fal Conde's independent stance, Franco summoned him to Burgos in early December and presented with the choice between exile and firing squad. The Rodezno-dominated Junta Nacional advocated compliance and Fal left Spain for Lisbon, remaining official though increasingly theoretical Carlist leader.

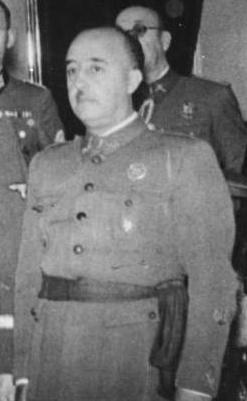
Francisco Franco

Faced with unification pressure Fal Conde did not dismiss such a perspective, but talking to fellow Traditionalists in Insua he insisted it should be completed on Carlist terms, reiterating this position also during February talks with Falangists. At meetings in Burgos (March) and Pamplona (April), unattended by Fal Conde, the balance tilted towards Rodeznistas, ready to accept Franco's terms of amalgamation. They presented Don Javier with an ultimatum and ensured that he at least did not object. Following Unification Decree Fal Conde was passed over as leader of a technically non-existent movement. Initially he did not protest and even advised to comply. Despite olive branch offered by Franco – including a ministerial job or seat in Consejo Nacional – he politely refused to join. His exile was lifted in October 1937. He eventually abandoned silence in favor of direct counter-action, suggesting to Don Javier that all those accepting seats in the FET executive be expelled; the regent acted on his advice. Unification turned into Falangist absorption of Carlist offshoots.

== Surveilled and confined ==
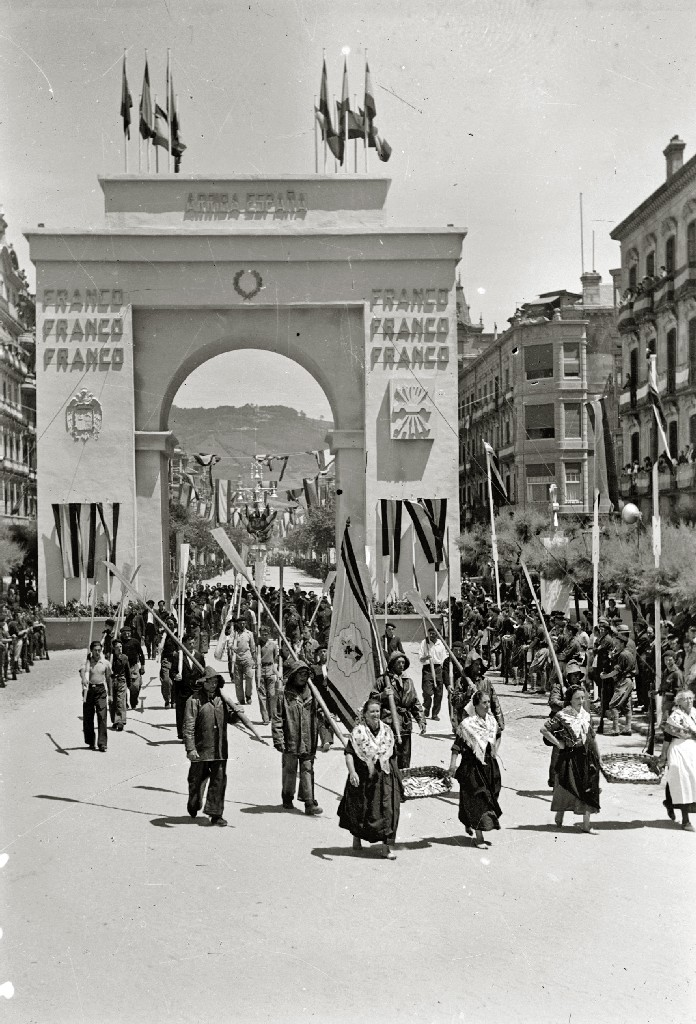
Francoist Spain, 1939

Upon return from exile and under security surveillance, Fal Conde tried to avert takeover of Comunión assets by FET; many years later he admitted that these efforts had been largely fruitless. Communicating by correspondence with loyal regional leaders he ordered re-engineering of party structures, but did not prevent Carlism from falling into political confusion and fragmentation. To gain platform for legal action, in 1939 he co-founded Hermandad de los Caballeros Voluntarios de la Cruz, intended as substitute for official Carlist network. As long as the war continued, he focused on maintaining Carlist identity and refrained from open opposition. Though violent confrontations between Requetés and Falangists were recorded all over Spain, almost all were spontaneous and none of the authors consulted claims they were planned or engineered by Fal Conde.

In March 1939 Fal Conde addressed Franco with a memorandum, titled Manifestación de ideales. Written with all due respect, the document claimed that the emerging regime was not sustainable and argued in favor of traditionalist monarchy; as transitory means it suggested a regency, either this of Don Javier or a collective one, alluding to Franco as its member. Though sounding more like an offer, the document, together with other texts disseminated around that time, is viewed by some scholars as a milestone marking total breakup with the regime and adoption of a decisive opposition strategy. Franco did not respond. He reacted, however, to mayhem which erupted in Pamplona following Fal Conde's appearance on the ayunatamiento balcony during re-burial of Sanjurjo on October 21, 1939: Fal was placed under house arrest in Seville.

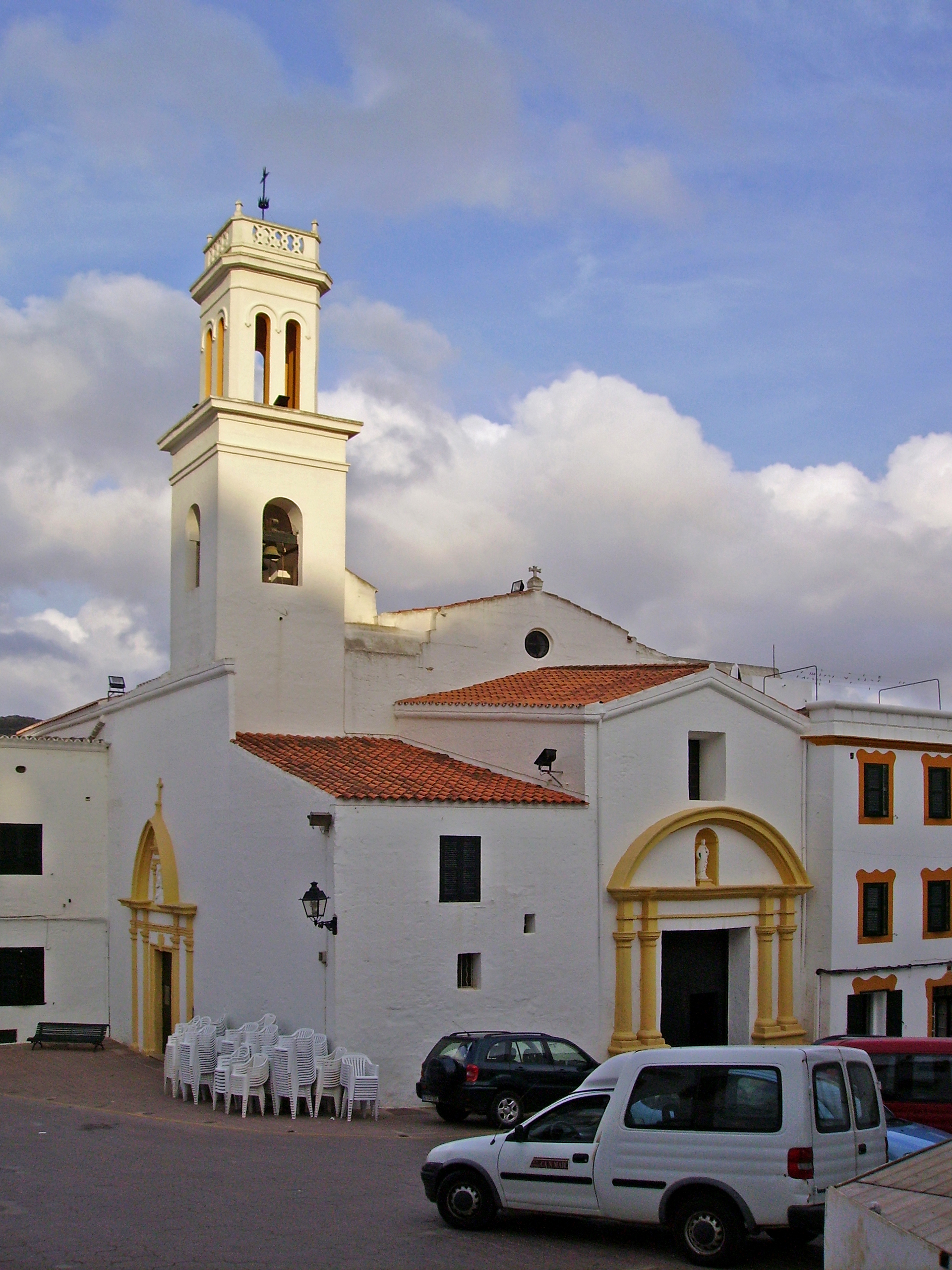
Ferreries, Menorca, the Balearic Islands

From his confinement Fal Conde presided over most vehement Carlist opposition, comparable only to hostility of the early 1970s. No collaboration with the regime was acceptable. The strategy was to ignore all officialdom and go public styling Traditionalist initiatives as religious or combatant activities, though conspiracy hand in hand with the communists has been rejected. Corresponding with regional leaders, in 1940-41 Fal Conde went on reconstructing Comunión structures either in traditional shape or in a new format; official party executive existed only in a makeshift mode. He launched veiled Carlist educational network of Academia Vázquez de Mella. Fal Conde banned Carlists from enlisting to División Azul and advocated strictly neutral stand in European conflict, considering the British and German wars equally unjust; this did not spare him charges of entanglement in a British plot, resulting in 4-month-long Ferreries exile in 1941.

Back in Seville Fal Conde was occasionally allowed to travel and was present during the massive Montserrat gatherings in 1942 and 1945. In 1943 he co-engineered Reclamación del poder, another memorandum signed by many Carlists and left unanswered by Franco. According to an unsure source, in 1944 he supported an aborted monarchist plot to depose the dictator. In August 1945 Fal Conde addressed Franco with a conciliatory personal letter; sort of acknowledging Falangist regime, but presenting Traditionalism as the unique long-term solution, he asked for release from confinement. The house arrest was indeed lifted in November 1945; during the 6-year long period of detention Fal Conde went on practicing as a lawyer.

== Resurgence and demise ==
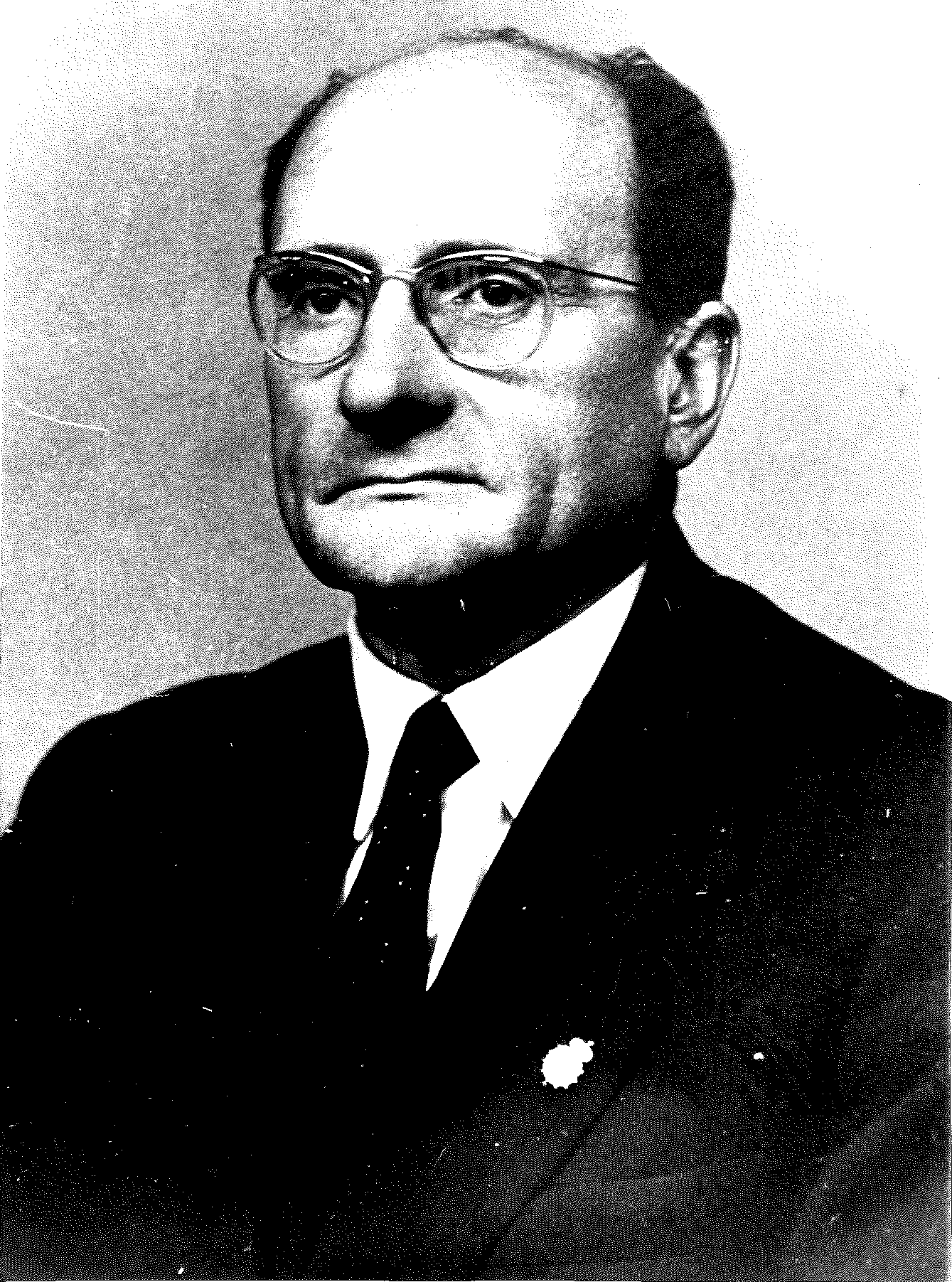
Mauricio de Sivatte

In December 1945 Valencia and Pamplona were rocked by Carlist riots; some speculate that they were pre-planned as a revolt against Franco. Fal Conde's presence is unsure; 3 weeks later he met Don Javier in San Sebastián; he also wrote to Don Juan, inviting him to recognize the regency. Soon Fal Conde commenced visiting provincial party structures; the exercise climaxed in monthly tour across the North in September 1946. Considering re-organization complete, in 1947 he assembled 48 local jefes in Madrid, the first such meeting since Insua. The gathering re-established Carlist executive, Consejo Nacional. La única solución, a document released afterwards, confirmed non-collaborative stance versus Francoism, Juanismo and Carloctavismo. Addressing a massively attended Montserrat aplec of 1947 seemed to demonstrate that Carlism was getting back in shape.

Leadership of Fal Conde was coming under fire from two groups. The Sivattistas suspected that by supporting overdue regency Fal Conde intended to ensure the crown for Borbón-Parmas by appeasing Franco. They were enraged by Fal Conde's recommendation to support Ley de Sucesión in referendum, considering it unacceptable backing of the regime, and demanded that a new Carlist king is declared. On the other hand, the possibilists were getting tired of what they perceived as ineffective intransigency and lack of legal outposts, recommending more flexible attitude. Though in 1948 Consejo de la Tradición confirmed non-collaborationist strategy, in 1949 some voices called for a more active stance, especially following news of Franco's negotiations with Don Juan.

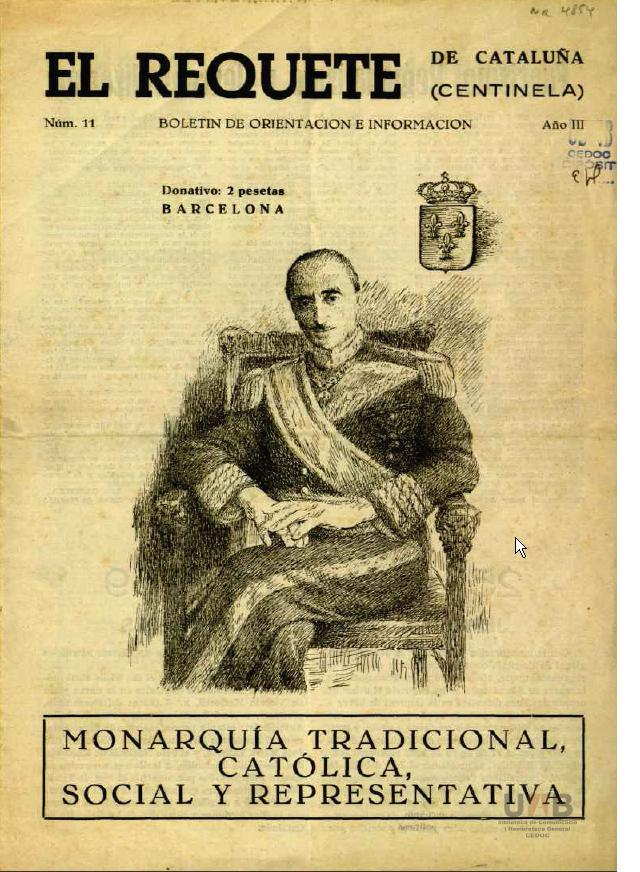
Don Javier as king on the cover of a Carlist periodical, 1950s

Fal Conde's reaction was multifold. On the one hand, he fought back militant dissenters like Sivatte. On the other, he tried to address questions raised. Intending to broaden the party's room for maneuvering, he permitted individual Carlists to run in local elections, especially that in some provinces the movement effectively competed for power with Falange. In 1951 he launched a campaign to buy a national daily, Informaciones; the title later served as an unofficial Carlist tribune. Student and worker groupings, AET and MOT, recorded increased activity. Though in 1951 Fal Conde tried to keep low profile of Don Javier's tour across Levante, all this changed in 1952: during Eucharistic Congress in Barcelona Don Javier claimed his rights as a king before having been promptly expulsed from Spain.

As Don Javier soon backtracked on the so-called Acto de Barcelona and Franco's regime showed no signs of cracking, the non-collaborative policy of the Falcondistas was increasingly looking like a dead end street. The so-called "duros" advocated a decisive anti-Francoist course, the so-called "unionistas" opted for rapprochement towards the regime and possibly a dynastical accord with Alfonsinos, some in the party called for a "tercera vía" and many complained about Fal Conde's "estilo autoritario". Fal Conde himself has run out of steam; in his July 1955 letter to Franco he seemed settled for the perspective of mere survival of Carlism. Though he remained in perfect understanding with Don Javier and until that moment the terms "Falcondistas" and "Javieristas" were used interchangeably, also the Carlist king felt that Carlism needed a new leader. In August 1955 Fal Conde resigned as Jefe Delegado.

== Retiree ==
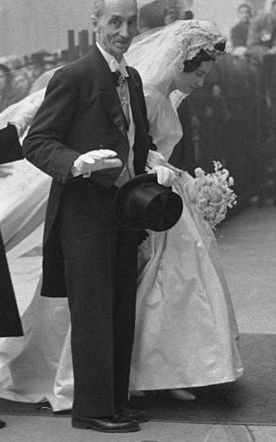
Don Javier, 1960

Following his resignation Fal Conde took a step back from daily politics and functioned as honorary member, sporadically invited to sittings of Carlist executive as late as 1964. He remained loyal to the new Communion leader, Valiente, even given the latter embarked on new, collaborationist strategy. Though continuously anti-Francoist, he avoided uncompromising radicalism. On the one hand, in 1956 he opposed backtracking on Acto de Barcelona, demanded by the Francoist authorities. On the other, when consulted about planned appearance of Carlos Hugo at Montejurra in 1957, he spoke to the negative, warning about a violent reaction from Franco. Though his advice was ignored, he maintained good relations with Carlos Hugo and was consulted on his 1958 Montejurra address. Upon first signs of breakup between Progressists and Traditionalists Fal Conde praised Carlos Hugo for ousting Zamanillo in 1962. He attended some Montejurra aplecs, turning into the prince's promotional stage, himself; in 1963 he needed assistance when climbing the summit. In the mid-1960s he recommended publication of a "libro blanco", advancing the Borbón-Parma claim.

In 1967 Don Javier made Fal Duque de Quintillo, Grandee of Spain, an exceptional honor as it was the only case of Don Javier granting a noble title to anyone beyond the royal family. Despite the elevation, cordial relations between Fal Conde and his king were deteriorating. Quoting health reasons, Fal Conde did not attend the ducado ceremony in Fatima. Though Don Javier and Carlos Hugo urged him to recommend supporting Ley Orgánica in the 1966 referendum, Fal Conde agreed to recommend participation, but clinging to his anti-Francoism he refused to endorse the law. When in 1968 the Borbón-Parmas were expulsed from Spain, Fal Conde resisted their repeated requests to meet Franco seeking reversal of the decision and responded that he had no reason to pay a penitent visit to the dictator. In wide correspondence he expressed concern about the socialist stand of Carlos Hugo of the late 1960s. Despite mounting doubts, he did not join those turned against the dynasty, like Zamanillo or Elias de Tejada; when in 1970 the prince ordered termination of collaboration with El Pensamiento Navarro, re-claimed by orthodox Traditionalists, Fal complied. He was particularly embittered by cancellation of annual Quintillo remembrance act in 1972. In 1973 he considered himself dynastically loyal to Don Javier, but in disagreement with his political line. In 1974 Fal Conde lost any illusions as to the Leftist turn of the Borbón-Parmas.

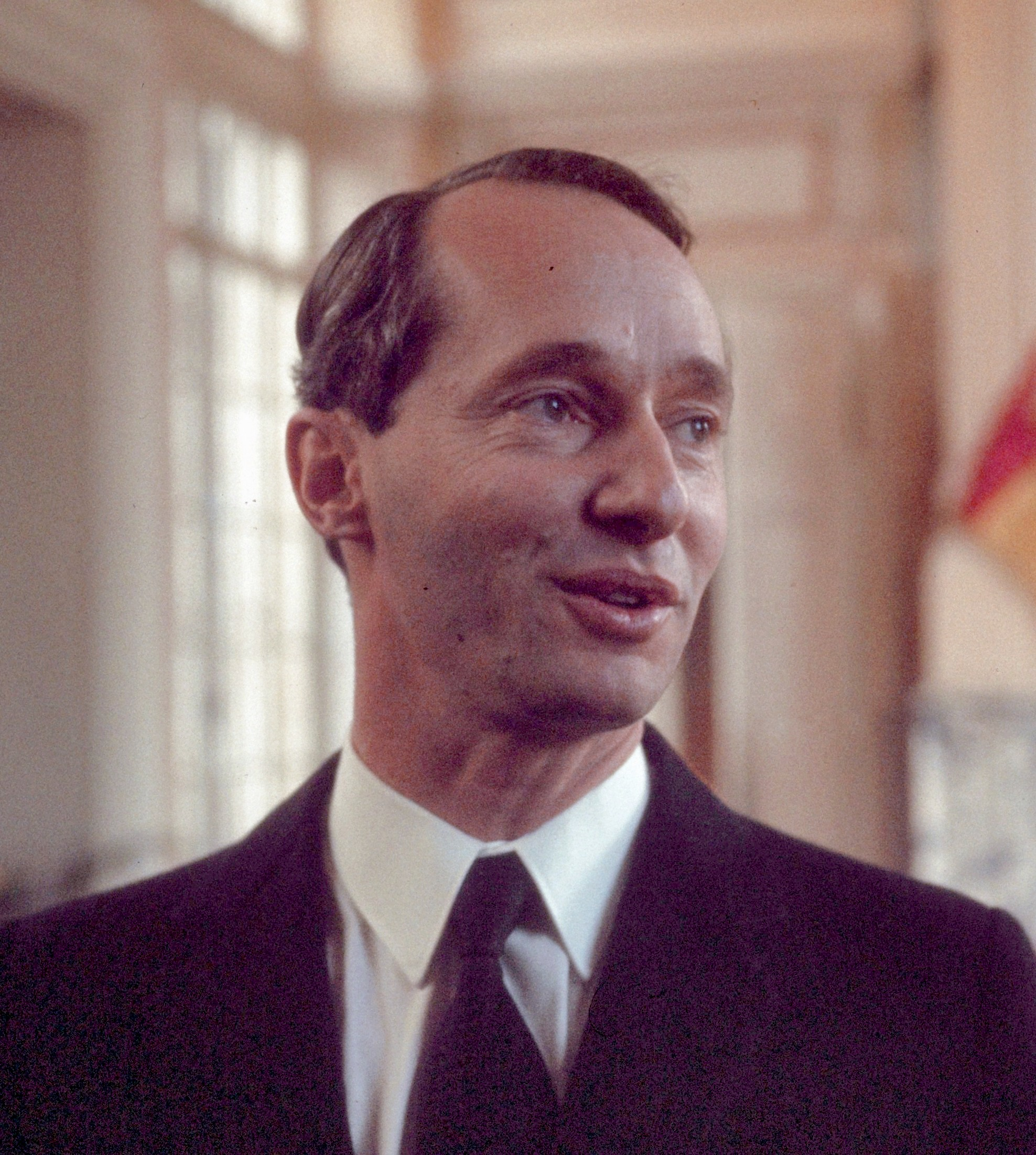
Don Carlos Hugo, 1970

Throughout all his life Fal Conde was a fervent Catholic, receiving communion every day even when visiting frontlines during the Civil War. When released from political duties he was dedicating even more time to religious issues. He co-founded religious associations, accepted posts in others and was active in Andalusian initiatives of various orders. He headed Editorial Católica Española and launched Premio Vedruna, though remained perplexed by new course of the Vatican. In the early 1970s "Don Manuel" enjoyed patriarch status in the realm of Andalusian Catholicism and among Traditionalist Carlists nationwide. He remained emotionally attached to Don Javier. Fal Conde died one month after his abdication.

== Reception and legacy ==
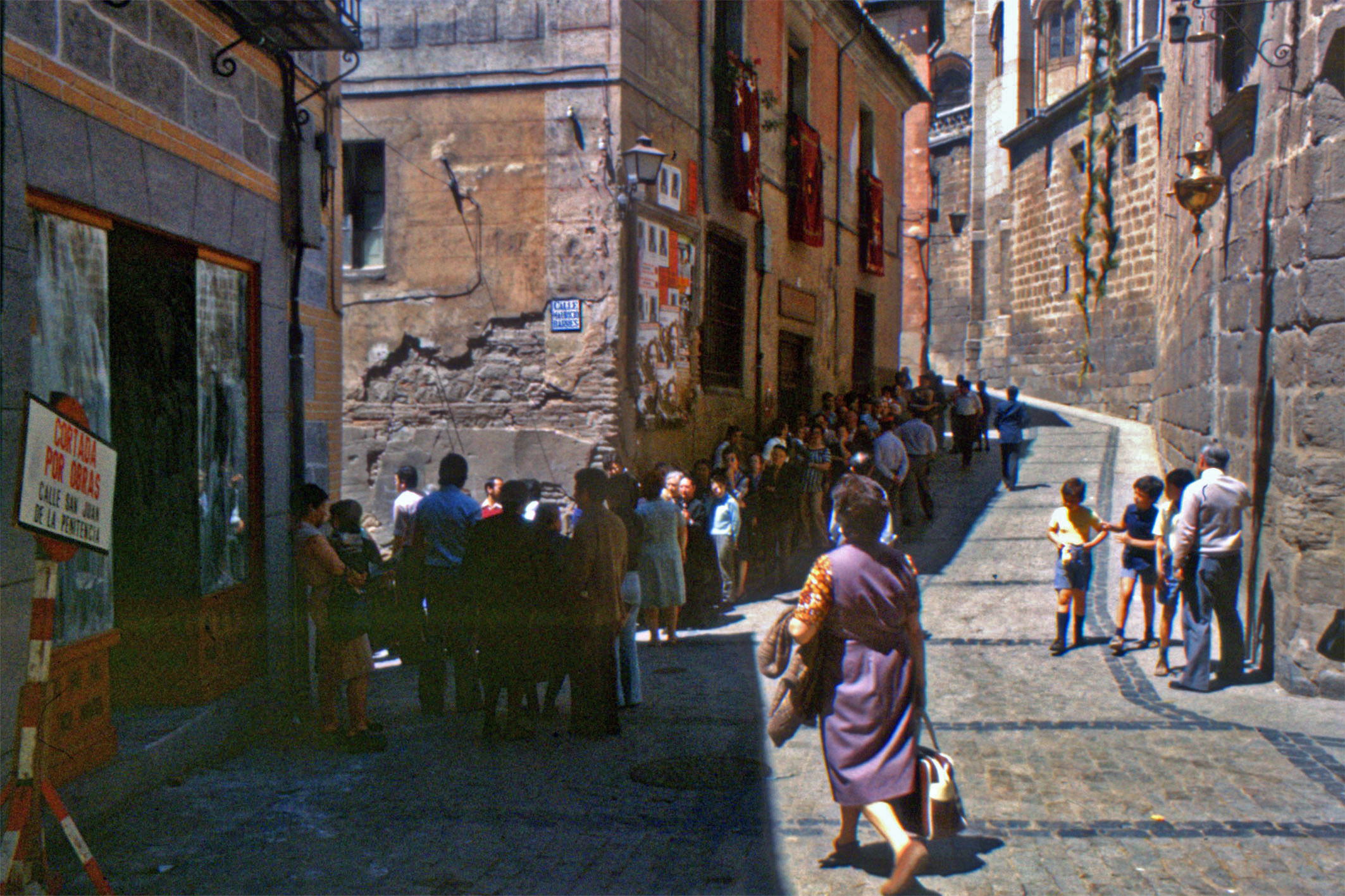
Elections in Spain, 1977

As a political event, the death of Fal Conde was soon eclipsed by the just commencing Spanish transition to democracy. In the late 1970s and the 1980s his memory was subject to competition on part of the socialist Partido Carlista and various breeds of Traditionalism, especially as they engaged in bitter political struggle. Followers of Don Carlos Hugo presented Fal Conde focusing on his loyalty to Borbón-Parmas and on his anti-Francoism, attempting to mount him in their overall vision of Carlism as a popular class struggle. Traditionalists, including Fal Conde's sons, reclaimed him as fervent Catholic and a conservative who guarded genuine Carlist orthodoxy against Francoism but has also never approved of the socialist turn of the Huguistas. These two visions, offered by militants of both groupings, keep contending until today.

Fal Conde started to figure prominently in historiography in the 1990s, and until today there have been numerous articles published in specialized reviews, dedicated either to particular episodes or to certain dimensions of his activity. However, he gained no full-blown scholarly monograph so far. Two books dedicated to Fal Conde and published in 1978 and 1998 are formatted as homage rather than as scientific historical works. He is usually presented as an intransigent opponent of Franco. He is generally recognized for excellent organizational skills, especially during early years of his leadership, though there are exceptions. Fal Conde is usually not acclaimed as a theorist; some students tend to view him as an inflexible doctrinaire, those who do not underline his Integrist, holistic vision of politics and religion.

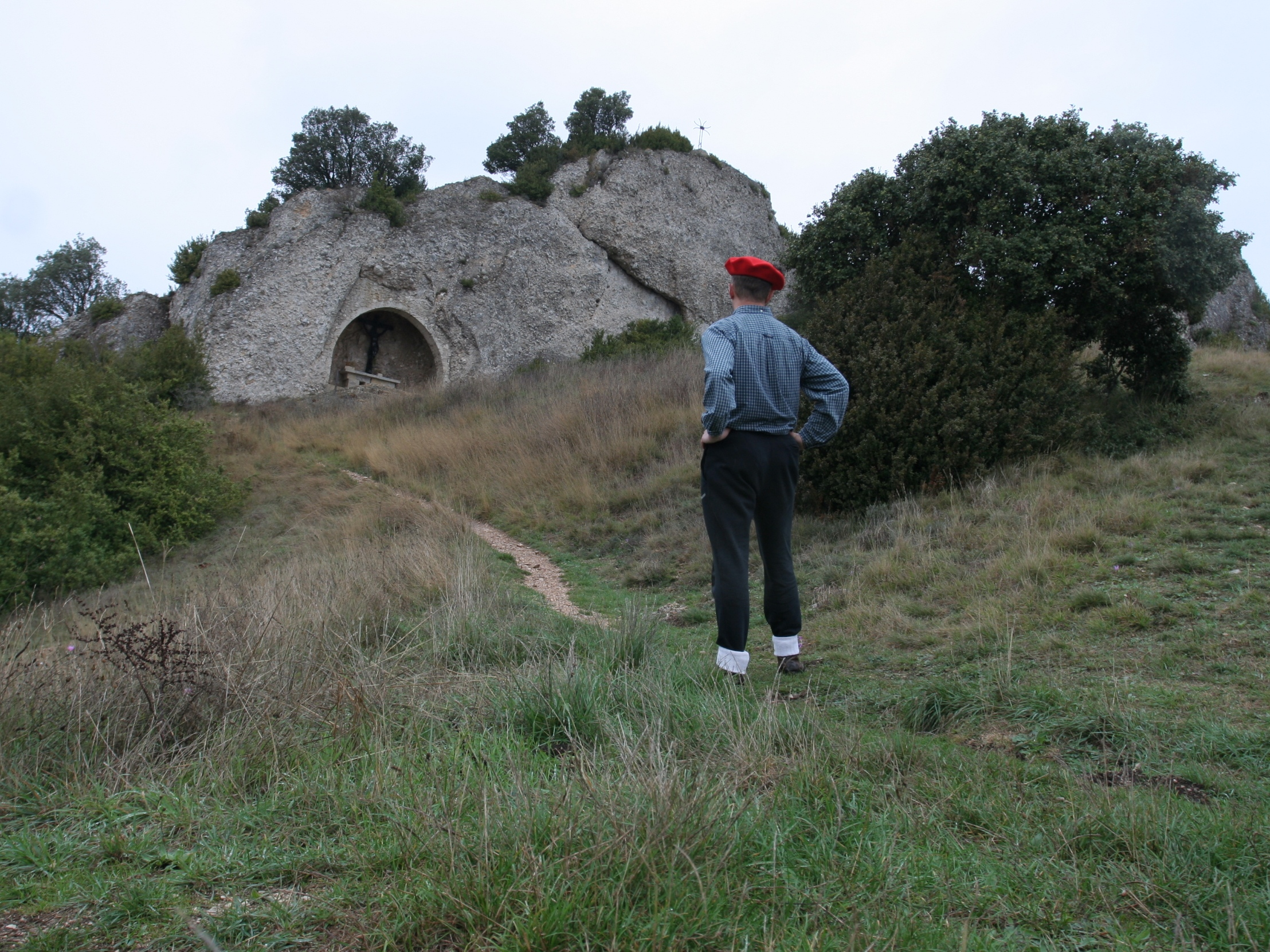
Montejurra, 2014

In popular discourse Fal Conde, unlike most Carlist political leaders, has generally evaded usual lambasting as "fascista" (fascist) or "reaccionario" (reactionary). Newspaper pieces claim that he "revived popular character of Carlism" and even maintain that his vision contained threads which could have contributed to "reencuentro de España" (reunion of Spain), but were lost in "tiempos de intolerancia" (times of intolerance). Nevertheless, the naming of a major throughway street honoring Fal Conde in Sevilla was controversial. As a result, in 2009 the street was renamed with Fal Conde's name retained only in a short adjacent drive.

== See also ==
- Carlism
- Integrism (Spain)
- Don Javier
- Tomás Domínguez Arévalo
- Maurici de Sivatte i de Bobadilla
- Unification Decree (Spain, 1937)
