= Paci =

Paci is an Italian surname. People with this name include:

- Alessandro Paci (born 1964), Italian actor, film director, and comedian
- Alfred Paci, Swiss curler
- Francesca Paci (born 1971), Italian journalist
- Frank G. Paci (born 1948), Italian-born Canadian novelist and teacher
- Guido Paci (1949–1983), Italian motorcycle racer
- Mario Paci (1878–1946), Italian pianist, orchestra conductor, and educator
- Massimo Paci (born 1978), Italian footballer and coach
- Roberto Paci Dalò (born 1962), Italian author, composer, musician, film maker, theatre director, and visual artist
- Roy Paci (born 1969), Italian trumpeter, singer, composer, and arranger

== See also ==
- Pacifier
- PACI (disambiguation)
