= Gonzalo Orquín =

Spanish painter, photographer (born 1982)

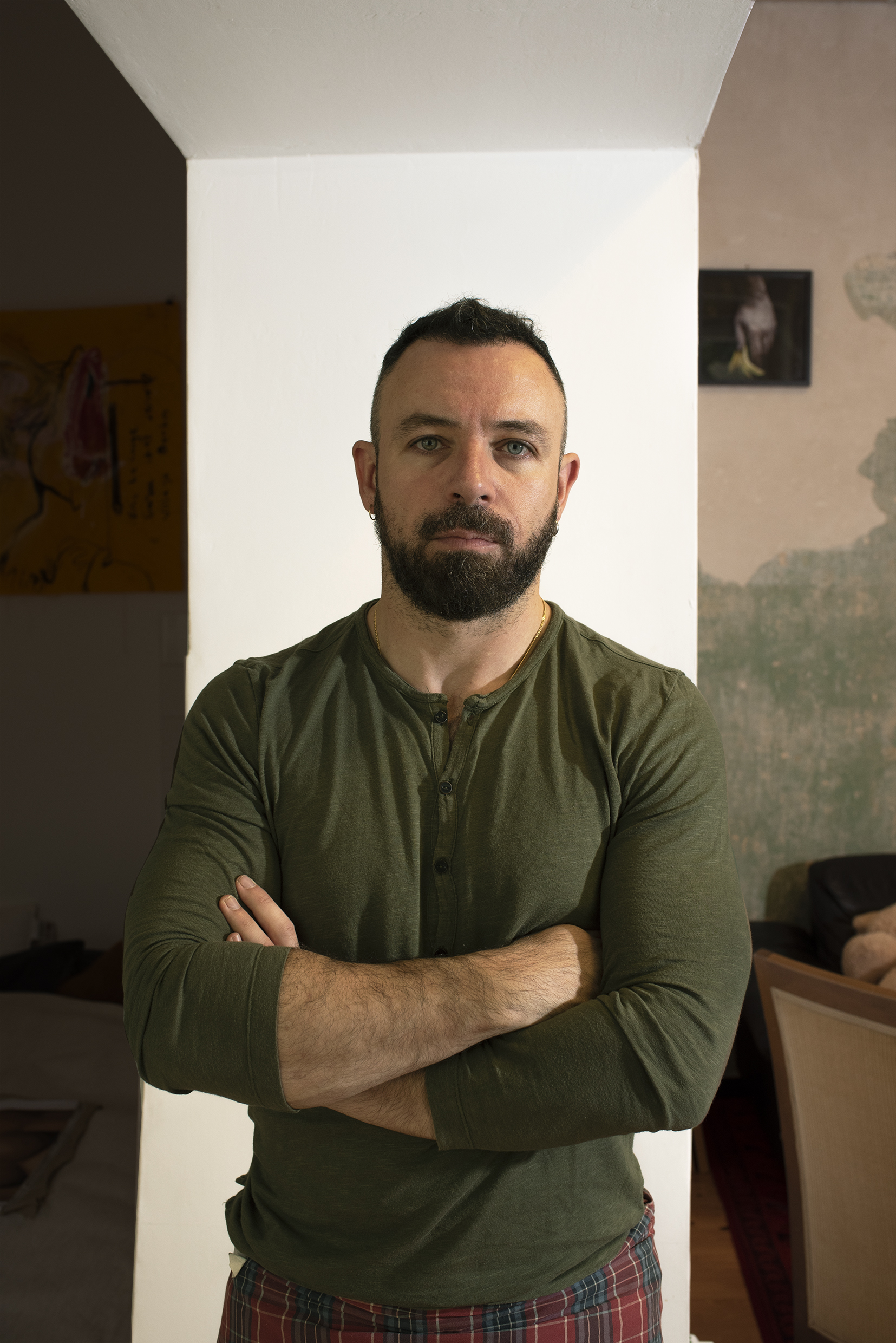
- Orquín in 2021
- Born: 1982 (age 43–44); Aracena, Province of Huelva, Spain
- Education: University of Seville
- Occupations: Painter, photographer
- Website: gonzaloorquin.com

Gonzalo Orquín (born 1982) is a Spanish painter and photographer.

He is known for his paintings of intimate scenes of melancholy and everyday eroticism, and his 2013 photography series, Sí, quiero, featuring gay and lesbian couples kissing in Roman Catholic churches in Rome.

== Early life and education ==
Orquín was born in 1982 in Aracena, Province of Huelva, Spain. He moved with his family to Seville from a very young age, where he studied fine arts at the University of Seville from 2000 to 2004.

Since 2004, he has been living between Italy and Spain.

He loves working with different media, techniques and languages: oil on canvas, paper, photography, installation, street art.

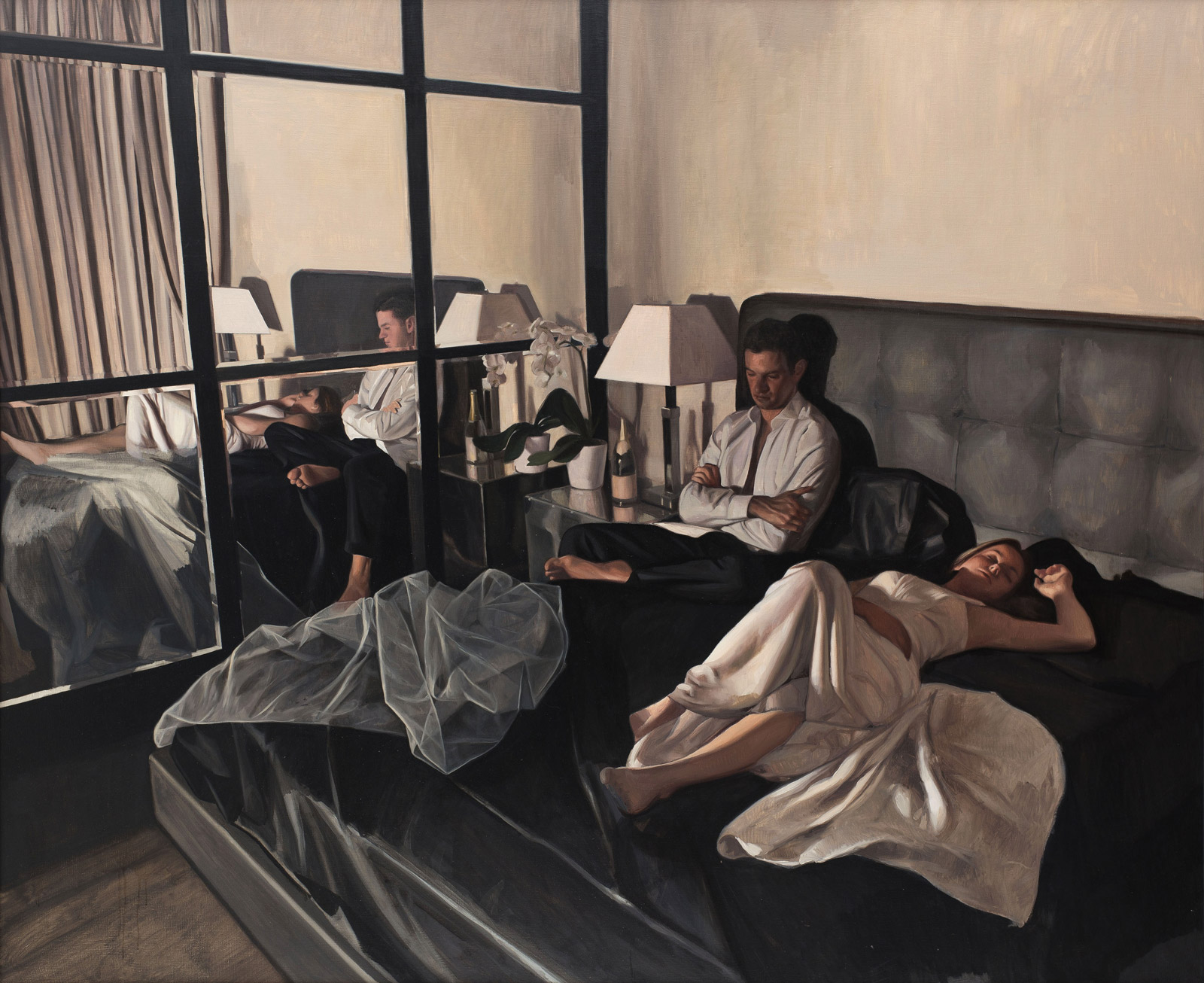

=== Career ===
The Leslie-Lohman Museum of Gay and Lesbian Art, in New York City, has described his works as "pronouncedly domestic, intimate, post-coital, and romantic. Set in common place interiors of muted tones, his subjects – which include cats, dogs, solitary men and women, as well as gay and straight couples – display a contemplative depth of emotion."

He is always committed to the rights of the LGBTQIA+ world. One of his photographic works of 2014, Sí, quiero, had a wide worldwide echo attracting an official warning from the Vatican to expose the work.

Orquín focuses his attention on contemporary heroes, martyrs and resisters, proudly gay in countries where homosexuality is still opposed and punished up to the death penalty.

Syria and the (new) disasters of war, gender identity, the drama of migrants, culture and knowledge as tools of civilization, the portrait and the image of intimate everyday life. Orquín reflects on the past, but citing the present and addressing highly topical issues.

His first exhibition was in 1998 in Seville, when he was 16 years old. His first solo show was in Rome, Italy, in 2006, when he was 24 years old.

The main exhibitions held include:

- BP Award, shortlisted in the exhibition promoted by the National Portrait Gallery in London
- In Loving Memory, artist residency and exhibition at the Museum of Contemporary Art of Rome (MACRO), 2019
- Fighting, Loving, Dreaming – My Berlin Diaries at Village in Berlin
- Próximo destino: Roma, solo show at the Instituto Cervantes in Rome, 2018
- Librografie, solo show at the Casa delle Letterature in Rome, 2015; and then the Embassy of Italy, Washington, D.C., 2017
- Sí, quiero, solo show at The Leslie-Lohman Museum of Gay and Lesbian Art in New York City, 2014

In 2020, Orquín was commissioned to paint the portrait of Alfonso Dastis, former Ministro de Asuntos Exteriores de España for the gallery of portraits at the Palacio de Santa Cruz in Madrid.

In 2023, Orquín inaugurated his exhibition Being Human – The Sea at Night Is Too Big at the Migratie Museum Migration in Brussels, as a collateral event of the 2023 Spanish Presidency of the Council of the European Union. Commissioned by the Spanish Embassy in Belgium, the exhibition stems from an idea by Francesca Paci, a journalist from La Stampa, and aims to tell stories and experiences of migrants and refugees arriving in Europe, focusing particularly on two main points, by sea in Lampedusa, Italy, and Bihac, Bosnia, along the so-called Balkan route.

To carry out the project, the artist collaborated with ARCI, the Italian Consortium of Solidarity – Refugee Office (ICS), the International Organization for Migration (IOM) and the United Nations High Commissioner for Refugees (INHCR), with the special collaboration of Italian photojournalist Francesco Malavolta. The exhibition is completed with a short documentary film, directed by the French director Alex Forge, who narrates all the work behind the paintings, the trips and the meetings with migrants and refugees.

He has taken part in exhibitions including:

- The Looking Glass and Through It at the Museum of 20-21 Century Art in Saint Petersburg
- Artsiders at the Galleria Nazionale dell'Umbria in Perugia, 2014
- El día y la noche at the Spanish Academy in Rome, 2014
- Imperfectu at the International Film and Gender Festival in Tijuana, Mexico, 2014
- Trialogo at the Galleria L'Opera in Rome, 2013

His work has been written about in: The Art Newspaper, Rai Cultura, La Repubblica, Corriere della Sera, The Huffington Post (US, France, UK, Spain), Le Figaro, Le Monde, the New York Daily News, La Stampa, Il Giornale del arte, Artribune, Exibart, and Inside Art.

=== Sí, quiero ===
In 2013, Orquín shot a photographic series of gay and lesbian couples, mostly friends and acquaintances, kissing in Roman Catholic churches in Rome. He planned to include the photographs in an exhibition entitled Trialogo, which was scheduled to open at the Galleria L'Opera in Rome.

However, before they could be shown, Vatican City officials sent a letter threatening legal action should the photographs be shown. Spokesman Claudio Tanturri told a newspaper that the photographs violate the Constitution of Italy, saying:

"Italian constitutional law safeguards an individual's religious feeling and the function of places of worship. Therefore photos that are not suitable and do not conform to the spirituality of the place offend and infringe upon the advancement of man in the particular place for the expression of faith."

Orquín spoke to lawyers and decided not to exhibit the photographs "for security reasons", but maintained that lawyers were working on the case and that he hoped the photographs would be shown eventually. As an act of protest, he posted on his Facebook page a picture of the photographs on the museum wall covered in black paper and crosses fashioned out of black tape pasted to the wall. Orquín told reporters that he found Italy to be "a very homophobic country", saying "There aren't other countries in Europe or the West that are backward like this." Gay-rights groups in Italy were quick to protest. Flavio Romani, president of the group Arcigay, strongly criticized the Vatican's reaction, saying:

"In the images in which the church have seen provocation, I see an exchange of love, a type of public worship that creates harmony not contrast. The indignation of the Catholic Church, therefore, is extremely grotesque."

In 2014, it was announced that the Leslie-Lohman Museum of Gay and Lesbian Art would be hosting the exhibit under the title Si, quiero, (English: Yes, I Want).
