= Antonio Cuevas =

Spanish politician (born 1949)

Antonio Cuevas Delgado (Puente Ganil, Spain, 7 May 1949) is a Spanish politician of the Spanish Socialist Workers' Party (PSOE).

== Early life and education ==
Cuevas studied at the University of Seville and became a technical architect.

== Career ==
In the late 1960s Cuevas was a Trade Union activist for the Unión General de Trabajadores, which at that time was illegal under the Francoist State.

In the 1986 general election, Cuevas was elected to the Spanish Congress representing Seville. He was re-elected at all subsequent elections in 1989, 1993, 1996, 2000, 2004 and 2008.

Cuevas was one of the earliest members of the reformist pro-capitalist "New Way" (nueva via) current within the PSOE which propelled leading member José Luis Rodríguez Zapatero to power. He is a strong supporter of a single energy market for Europe

== Other activities ==
- Indra Sistemas, Member of the Board of Directors (since 2019)

== Personal life ==
Cuevas is married with three children.
