= Aracena =

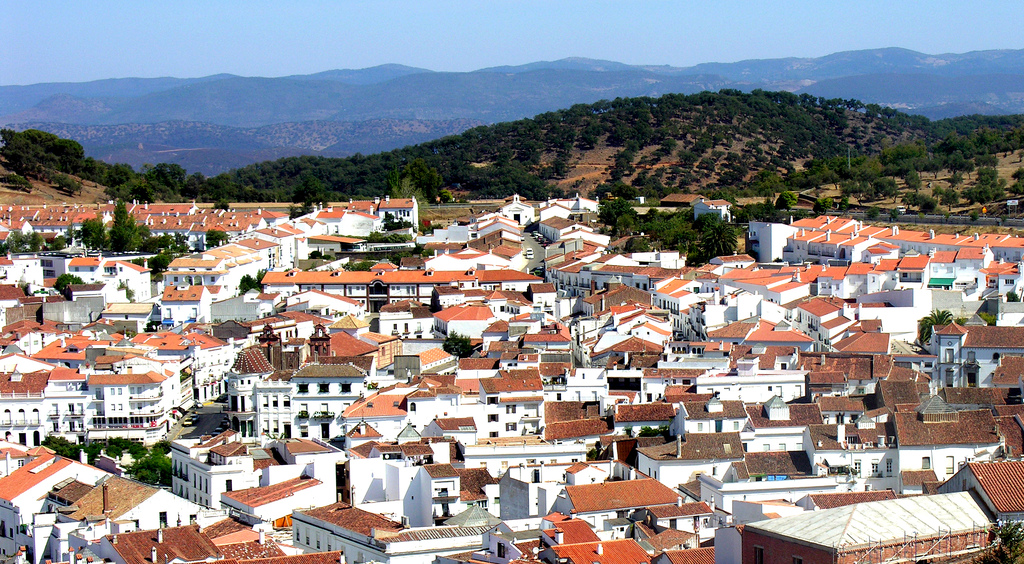

- Flag Coat of arms

- Location in the Province of Huelva Location in Andalusia Location in Spain
- Coordinates: 37°53′28″N 6°33′40″W
- Country: Spain
- Autonomous community: Andalusia
- Province: Huelva
- Comarca: Sierra de Huelva

Government
  - Mayor: Manuel Guerra González (PSOE-A)

Area
  - Total: 184 km^{2} (71 sq mi)

Population (2025-01-01)
  - Total: 8,425
  - Density: 45.8/km^{2} (119/sq mi)
- Time zone: UTC+1 (CET)
  - Summer (DST): UTC+2 (CEST)
- Website: Official website

Aracena (Spanish pronunciation: [aɾaˈθena]) is a town and municipality located in the province of Huelva, southwestern Spain. According to the 2025 municipal register, the city has a population of 8,425 inhabitants. The town derived its name from the Sierra de Aracena, which is part of the Sierra Morena system.

Aracena is the largest town in the Parque Natural Sierra de Aracena y Picos de Aroche. In 2006, Aracena was named a Tourist Municipality of Andalusia and became the first town in the province of Huelva to achieve this status.

== Main sights ==
=== Aracena Castle ===
Prominent attractions in the town include Aracena Castle and the Priory Church, together known as the Castillo-Iglesia de Nuestra Señora de los Dolores, built between the 13th and 15th centuries over the ruins of an earlier castle. The oldest sections are of late Gothic-Mudéjar style.

Aracena Castle was erected in the thirteenth century, during the Islamic period, and was itself built on the site of an ancient Moorish castle. The walled enclosure was partitioned inside, with the tower of homage, or castle keep, defending the barrier that divided its interior. The population of Aracena settled around this structure, giving rise to the current urban landscape. During the late Middle and Modern Ages, Aracena continued growing from the Cerro del Castillo (Castle Hill) into the valley, first as unattached land dependent on Seville and later, in the seventeenth century, as a feudal estate under the jurisdiction of the Count-Duke of Olivares. Still later, it was under the Count of Altamira, who carried the title of Prince of Aracena.

The fortress consists of the alcazaba, or citadel, with its watchtower, cistern and walls; these are flanked by other towers, as well as a fence line that, in its interior, once accommodated medieval living quarters.

=== Prioral Church ===
When Aracena was ceded by the Crown of Castile to the Knights Templar, that Order authorized the raising of the current Moorish-style church, noted for the glazed clay sculptures of Pedro Vazquez and which takes its name from the local patron saint, Nuestra Señora del Mayor Dolor [Our Lady of the Greatest Suffering].

The church is emblematic of Aracena and is the oldest church in the town. It consists of three naves of equal height with its choir at the feet and a polygonal presbytery to which, on the side of the chapel, there is attached its Mudéjar-style tower.

Also in the town is the church of Santa María de la Asunción, built in 1522.

=== Grotto of the Marvels ===
Also located in the town is the Gruta de las Maravillas, one of the most spectacular cave systems in Spain. The caves are located below the hill on which Aracena Castle stands. Opened to the public in 1913, it includes a total of 2130 metres of subterranean passages.

Several caverns and lakes are linked by these narrow passages. Coloured lighting adds to the effects of its unusual mineral formations. In the complex is a geological museum. The caves are said to have been found by a boy looking for a lost pig.

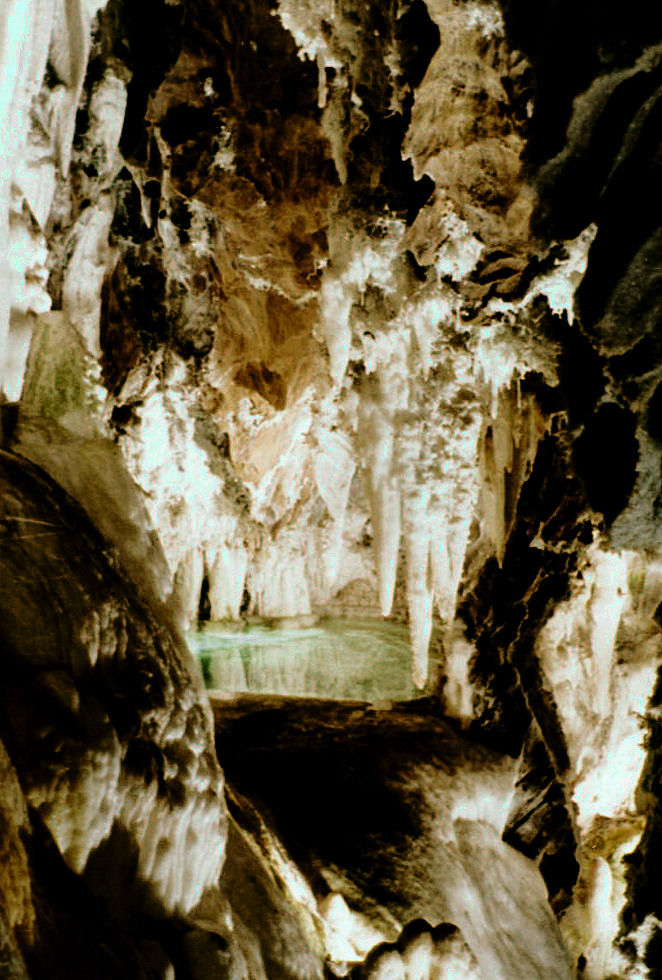
Grotto of the Marvels in Aracena

=== Ham Museum ===
El Museo del Jamón de Aracena (Ham Museum of Aracena) consists of seven rooms which trace the history, cultures and traditions surrounding the famous Iberian pigs.

=== Geological Museum ===
A geological museum separate to the small one associated with the cave has been opened on the city-facing slope of the castle hill in 2025. It contains Europe's largest dark exhibition hall with fluorescent minerals and a collection of rocks and fossils donated by the local geologist Francisco Orden Palomino.

== Notable people ==
- Gonzalo Orquín (born 1982), photographer and painter

== Gallery ==
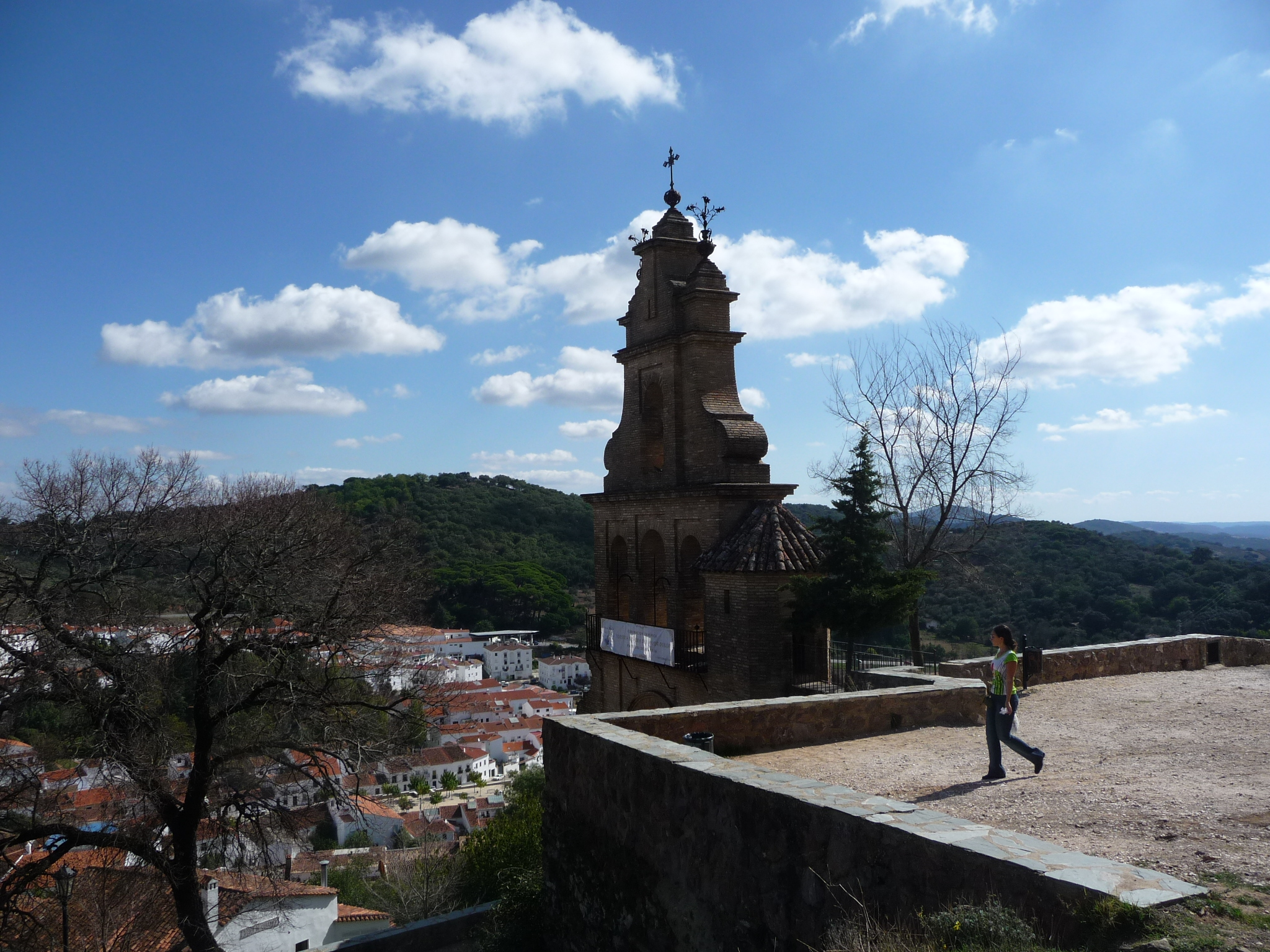
Church of Santa María de la Asunción.

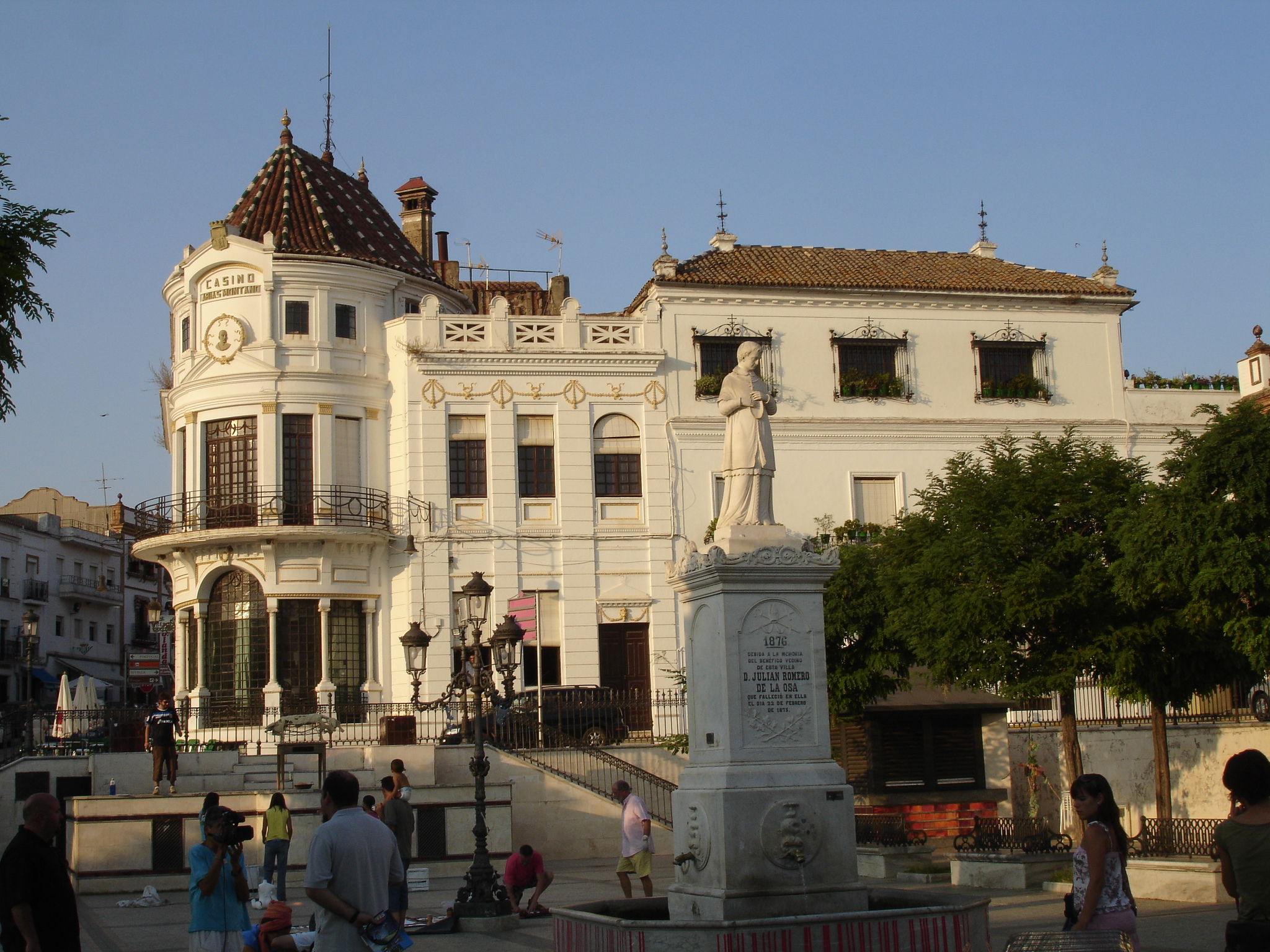
Casino of Aracena.

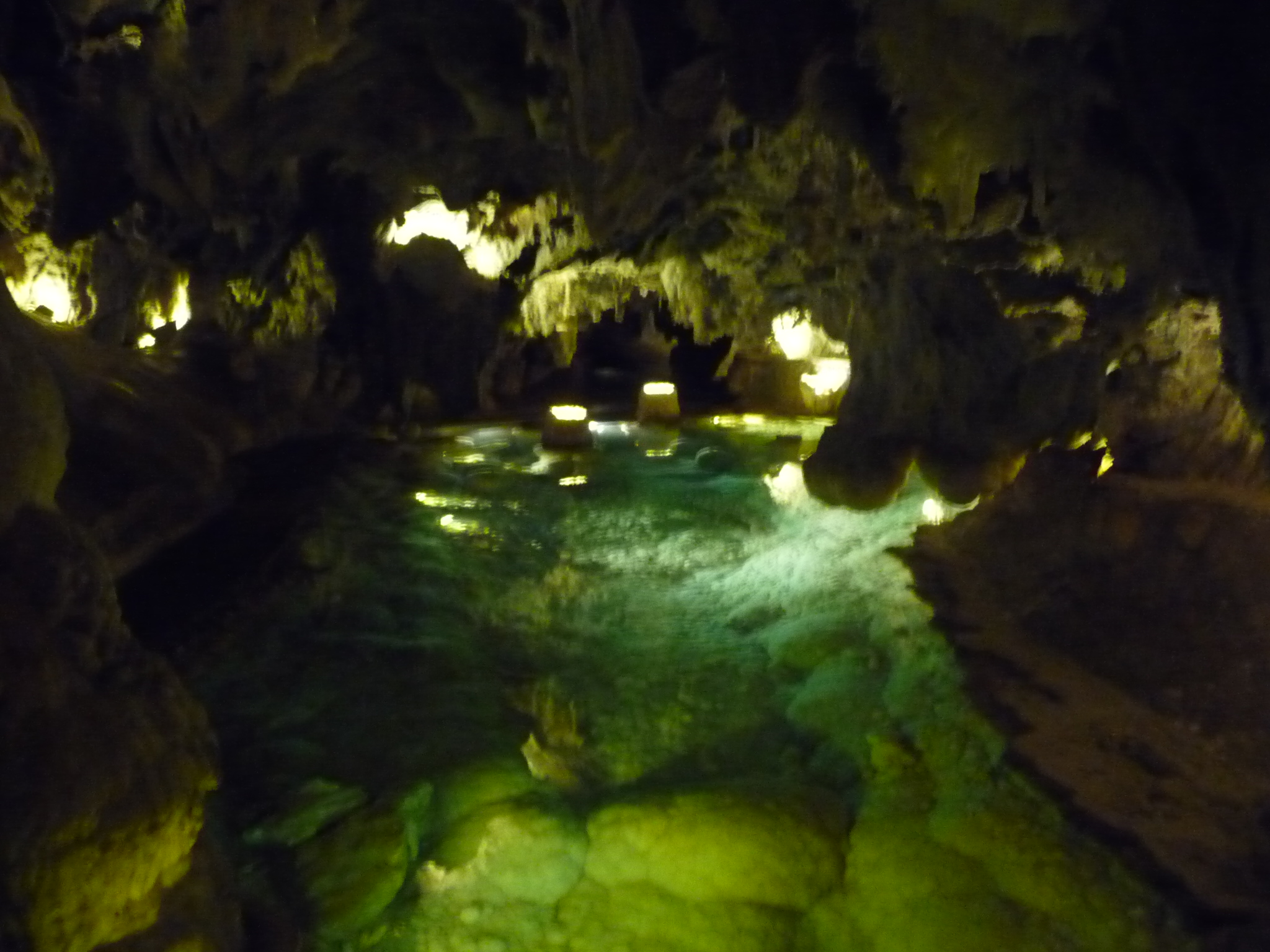
Gruta de Las Maravillas cave.

== See also ==
- List of municipalities in Huelva
