= Gruta de las Maravillas =

Cave in Aracena, Andalusia, Spain

Coordinates: 37°53′28″N 6°33′53″W

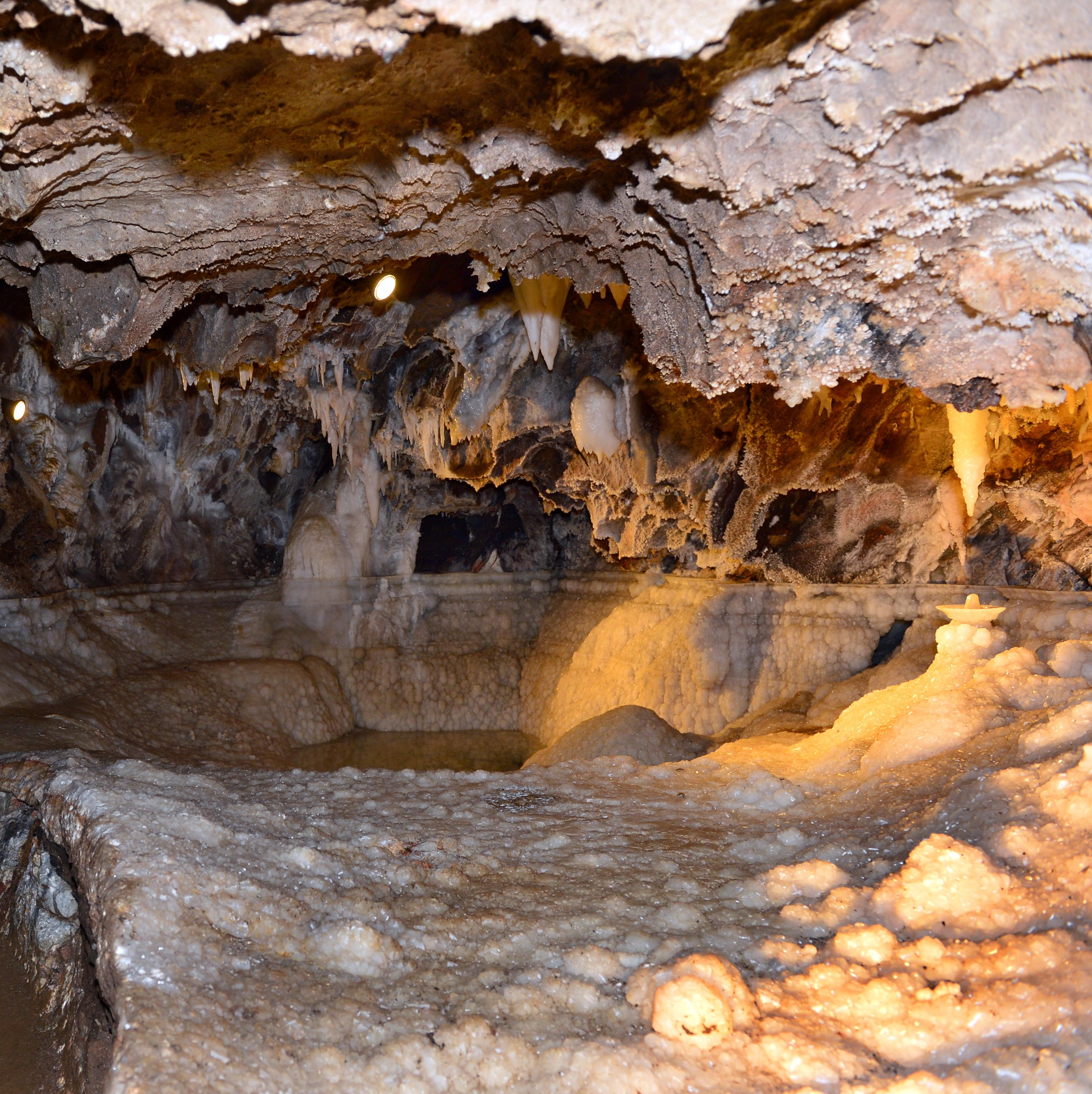
Interior of the grotto.

The Gruta de las Maravillas (English: "Grotto of the Marvels") is a cave in the town center of Aracena, Andalusia, Spain. It was the first Spanish cave to be opened to the public in 1914. It includes a total of 2130 subterranean meters of subterranean passages. According to popular tradition, its discoverer was a shepherd, and the first historical reference of its existence dates from 1886.
