= PACI =

PACI may refer to:

- Chalkyitsik Airport (ICAO location indicator: PACI), in Chalkyitsik, Alaska, United States
- Pacific AC Intertie, see also Path 15
- Partnering Against Corruption Initiative (PACI), a global anti-corruption and compliance platform organized by the World Economic Forum
- Partial anterior circulation infarct, a type of ischemic stroke
- Port Arthur Collegiate Institute, a former high school in Thunder Bay, Ontario, Canada
