= University of Seville =

Public university in Seville, Spain

- Universidad de Sevilla
- Seal of the University of Seville
- Type: Public
- Established: 1505; 521 years ago
- Academic affiliations: PEGASUS
- Budget: €497,776,950
- Students: 57,214
- Location: Seville, Andalucia, Spain; 37.38075790°N 5.99123070°W
- Colours: Yellow and Red
- Website: www.us.es

University rankings

Global – Overall
- ARWU World: 601–700 (2023)
- QS World: =469 (2026)
- THE World: 801–1000 (2024)
- USNWR Global: =520 (2023)

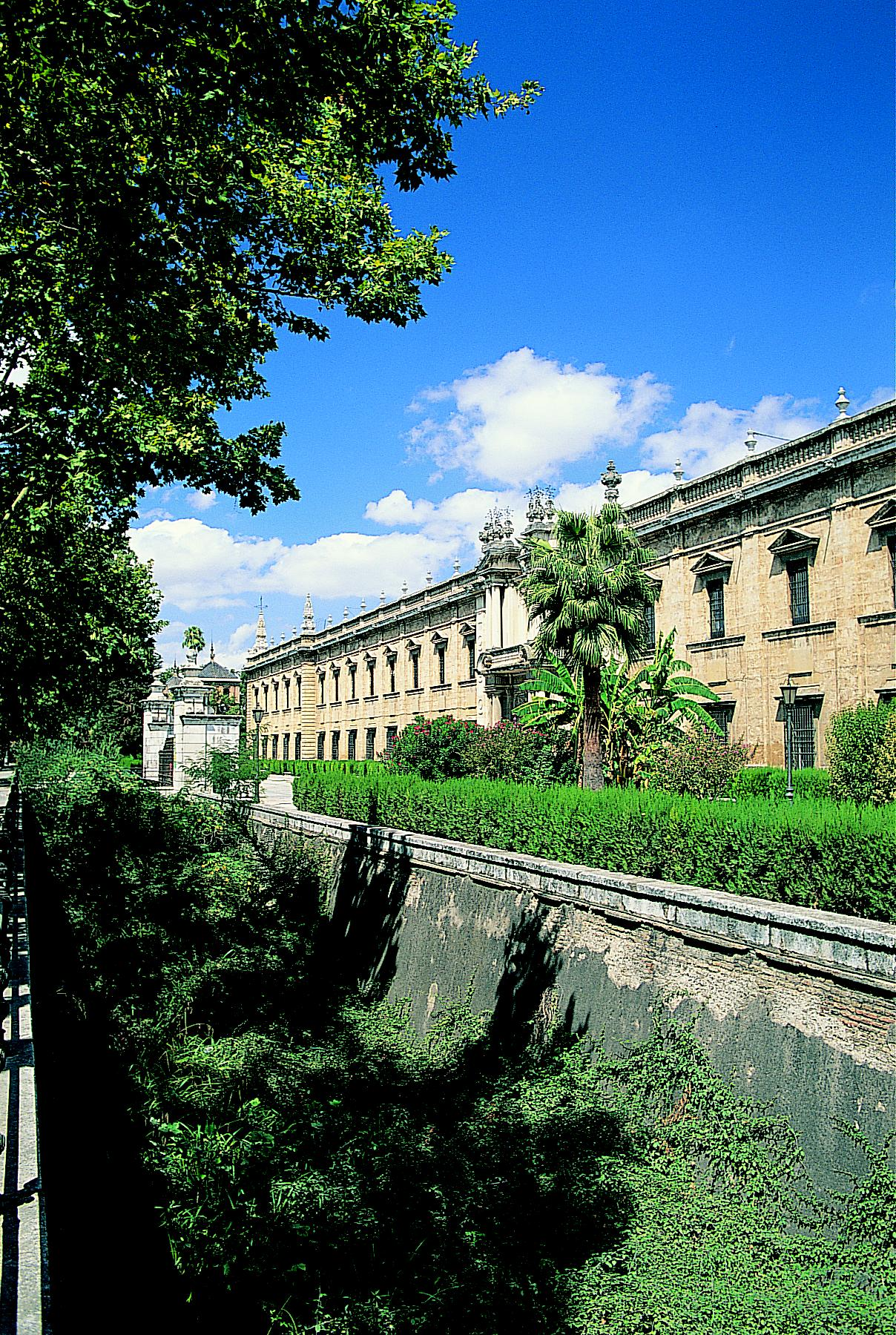
The "Old Tobacco Factory", now the university's main building

The University of Seville (Universidad de Sevilla) is a university in Seville, Andalusia, Spain. Founded under the name of Colegio Santa María de Jesús in 1505, in 2022 it has a student body of 57,214, and is ranked 6th among Spanish universities.

== History ==
=== Colegio de Santa María de Jesús ===
The University of Seville originally dates to the 15th century. Created by Archdeacon Maese Rodrigo Fernández de Santaella, it was originally called Colegio de Santa María de Jesús. In the 16th century (1505), a Bull of Pope Julius II granted the college the faculty to teach degrees in Theology, Philosophy, Law, Medicine and Arts. In 1551, the City Council allowed it, by means of a Royal Provision, to officially become a university, enjoying all the privileges of the other Spanish universities.

Its antecedents date back to the middle of the 13th century, the Dominicans, in order to prepare missionaries for work among the Moors and Jews, organised schools for the teaching of Arabic, Hebrew, and Greek. To cooperate in this work and to enhance the prestige of Seville, Alfonso the Wise in 1254 established "general schools" (escuelas generales) of Arabic and Latin in Seville. Alexander IV recognized this foundation as a generale litterarum studium by the Papal Bull of 21 June 1260 and granted its members certain dispensations in the matter of residence. Later, the cathedral chapter established ecclesiastical studies in the College of San Miguel. Rodrigo Fernández de Santaella, archdeacon of the cathedral and commonly known as Maese Rodrigo, began the construction of a building for a university in 1472; in 1502 the Catholic Monarchs published the royal decree creating the university, and in 1505 Julius II granted the Bull of authorization. The construction of the chapel of Santa Maria de Jesus began in 1505 and was consecrated on May 17, 1506. The work on the chapel was completed in 1519 and the construction of the college was finished around 1520. In 1526 it was enlarged with the acquisition of an adjoining plot of land that belonged to the Alcazar. The Catholic Monarchs and the pope granted the power to confer degrees in logic, philosophy, theology, and canon and civil law.

In 1621, new statutes were drawn up that gave the university greater independence with respect to the college, which, in turn, came to be sponsored by the Count-Duke of Olivares and was renamed Colegio Mayor de Santa María de Jesús, which differentiated it more from the nearby Colegio de Santo Tomás, governed by the Dominicans. In 1621 the university had four faculties: Theology, Canons and Law, Medicine and Arts, and granted the degrees of bachelor, bachelor and doctor in all faculties, along with that of master for the Faculty of Arts.

The colegio mayor de Maese Rodrigo and the university proper, although housed in the same building, never lost their separate identities, as is shown by the fact that, in the 18th century, the university was moved to the College of San Hermenegildo, while that of Maese Rodrigo remained independent, although languishing.

In 1767 Pablo de Olavide, assistant of Seville, after knowing the situation of the university, prepared a report in which other personalities participated, among them the clergymen José Cevallos and Luis Germán y Ribón, of the Real Academia Sevillana de Buenas Letras. The report proposed the end of the centers of theology studies, which were organized by different religious orders; the secularization of the chairs and their duration so that they would not be for life; the elaboration of new texts for the faculties of Theology, Arts or Philosophy, Canons and Law and Medicine, as well as a new course in Mathematics; and greater independence of the university with respect to the college. These proposals were approved by Royal Decree in 1769.

In 1767 the Jesuits were expelled from Spain. In 1768 Olavide proposed that the university be moved to the former professed house of that order, a 16th-century building on Laraña Street. This was approved by the Royal Order of May 31, 1768. The move took place in 1771.

The school was confiscated in 1835. It was used as a barracks for the local militia. In 1848 it was renovated, and housed the diocesan seminary. With this use, it underwent a major renovation at the end of the 19th century. The seminary was moved to the palace of San Telmo in 1901 and the school building was sold to the real estate developer Juan Bautista Calvi. In 1909 it was demolished for the creation of the current Constitution Avenue. The façade was moved to the Santa Clara convent, where it was mounted in 1922 by Juan Talavera y Heredia when a portion of the convent was used as a municipal museum. The façade remains in the convent of Santa Clara. The chapel of the school, which became the headquarters of the Consejo de Hermandades y Cofradías, has been preserved.

=== Real Universidad Literaria ===
In 1772 this center, now separated from the Colegio Mayor de Santa María de Jesús, was renamed "Real Universidad Literaria" (Royal Literary University). It had this name until 1845.

The Royal Decree of July 12, 1807, promoted by the minister José Antonio Caballero, implemented in all Spanish universities the study plan approved that year by the University of Salamanca and suppressed all the minor universities, such as those of Baeza and Osuna. Both were reinstated in 1815, although they were definitively suppressed in 1824. In the nineteenth century new general university plans and reforms were carried out that affected certain Spanish faculties.

In 1843 the Provincial and University Library of Seville was founded, and since its remodeling in 1845-68, it has become one of the most important libraries in Spain, with the acquisition of new books.

=== Hispalense University ===
The Universidad Hispalense, as the University of Seville is known, evolved in terms of its curricula and faculties and in terms of its location in the city during the 19th century with new professorships, the reform of faculties and the emergence of seminars and specialized libraries.

In terms of curricula, theology studies, due to the ecclesiastical influence, were among the last to be taught. The General Plan of 1845 suppressed theology in all Spanish universities except in five educational institutions, including Seville. It was eradicated from all universities in 1852; however, Seville reinstated it again in 1854, only to be definitively closed after the Revolution of 1868.

The Moyano Law (1857) created the Faculty of Exact, Physical and Natural Sciences of the University of Seville.

The reform of 1843 suppressed the teaching of medicine in Seville, with classes ceasing in the city in 1845 and moving to the city of Cadiz, in full swing. The Provincial and University Library was also in charge of the Library of the Faculty of Medicine in Cadiz. In 1868 the Free School of Medicine was created in Seville. In 1917, the Faculty of Medicine was founded in the city of Seville.

After a major remodeling, the University of Seville moved to the Real Fabrica de Tabacos between 1954 and 1956. The transformation of the building was a work of great significance, carried out by the architects Alberto Balbontín de Orta, Delgado Roig and Toro Buiza.

Initially it housed the Rector's Office and the Faculties of Science, Law and Philosophy and Letters. It currently serves as the headquarters of the rectorate and only houses the Faculties of Geography and History and Philology.

In the 1960s, the Higher Technical Schools of Architecture and Industrial Engineering were created. In the following decade, the Schools of Economics, and Pharmacy were created, the Faculty of Sciences was divided, giving rise to the Schools of Biology, Physics, Chemistry and Mathematics, and the University College of La Rábida, the seed of the University of Huelva, was created.

== Influence ==
The influence of the University of Seville, from the ecclesiastical point of view, was considerable, though not equal to that of the Universities of Salamanca and of Alcalá. Renowned alumni include Sebastián Antonio de Cortés, Riquelme, Rioja, Luis Germán y Ribón, founder of the Horatian Academy, Martín Alberto Carbajal, Cardinal Belluga, Cardinal Francisco Solís Folch, Marcelo Doye y Pelarte, Bernardo de Torrijos, Francisco Aguilar Ribón, the Abate Marchena, Alberto Lista, and many others who shone in the magistracy, or were distinguished ecclesiastics. The University of Seville had a great influence on the development of the fine arts in Spain. In its shadow the school of the famous master Juan de Mal Lara was founded, and intellects like those of Fernando de Herrera, Juan de Arguijo, and many others were developed, while literary and artistic clubs were formed, like that of Francisco Pacheco, which was a school for both painting and poetry. During the period of secularization and sequestration (1845–57) the University of Seville passed into the control of the State and received a new organization.

At the same time that the royal university was established, the Universidad de Mareantes (university of sea-farers) was developed. Here, the Catholic Monarchs established the Casa de Contratación by a royal decree of 1503, with classes for pilots and seamen, and courses in cosmography, mathematics, military tactics, and artillery. This establishment was of incalculable importance, for it was here that the expeditions to the Indies were organised, and the great Spanish mariners were educated. This form of polytechnic school, which, according to Eden, Bourné, and Alexander von Humboldt, had taught a great deal to Europe, fell into decay in the 17th century, following the fortunes of Spanish science.

== Equality, liberty, justice and pluralism ==
The university enjoys the independence afforded by self-governance, which gives it a certain flexibility that may work to advantage in the hiring of professors and lecturers. The ancient motto of the university is: "Equality, Liberty, Justice and Pluralism". The university's stated mission is to educate students who will do the research and development necessary to scientific and technological innovation. This is reflected in the number of degrees offered; students attending the university have a choice of 65 different subjects and one of the widest ranges of academic and sporting facilities in Spain, making it a popular university for both Spanish and international students. In 2004 it had 73,350 students spread on different campuses, being second in number of students among Spanish universities.

== Campus internationalization ==
Since 1994, North American exchange students have been able to take classes taught by University of Seville faculty members in Spanish in the Faculty of Philology and the Faculty of Geography and History. As of Fall 2009, the university has agreements with 15 international organizations including the Council on International Educational Exchange, the College Consortium for International Studies, International Studies Abroad, SUNY New Paltz and Wells College. and St. John's University. The University of Seville has had a partnership with the Real Colegio Complutense at Harvard University since 2015.

== Ulysseus European University ==
The University of Seville leads Ulysseus European University, which is one of the 68 European Universities selected by the European Commission to become the universities of the future. The seven other members of Ulysseus European University are: University of Genoa, Italy; Université Côte d’Azur, France; Technical University of Košice, Slovakia; MCI Management Center Innsbruck, Austria; and Haaga-Helia University of Applied Sciences, Finland; University of Munster, Germany and University of Montenegro.

== Organization ==
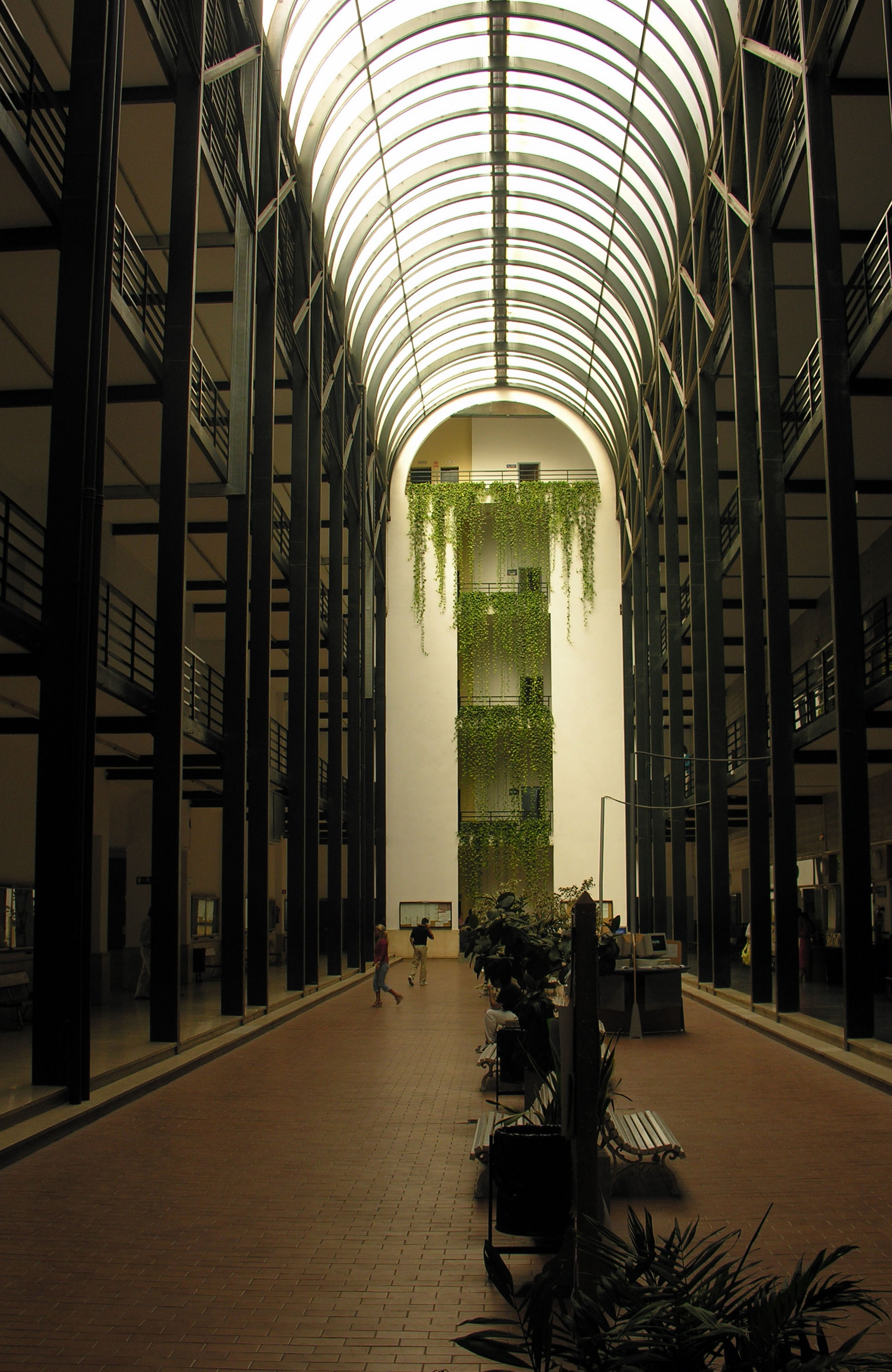
Economy and Business School (Facultad de Economía y Empresariales)

The University of Seville comprises:

- Governed by the Department Council (Consejo de Departamento): The Departments
- Governed by Centre Council (Junta de Centro): consists of
  - Faculties,
  - Technical Sciences Schools (Escuelas Técnicas Superiores), and
  - University Schools (Escuelas Universitarias).

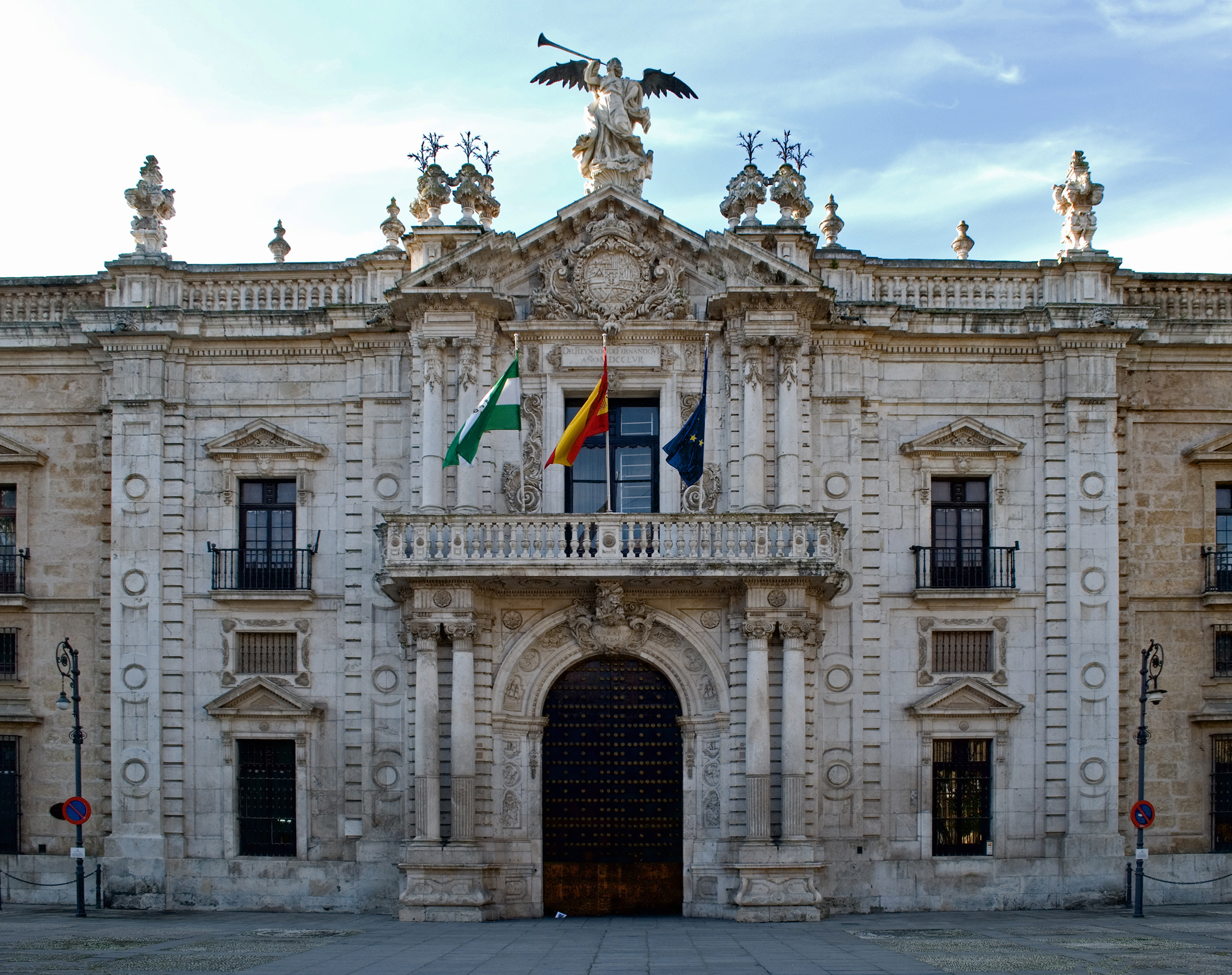
Facade of the building of the Rectorate

The main building of the University of Seville is known as the "Old Tobacco Factory", named for its original use. Built in the 18th century, Seville's tobacco factory was the largest industrial building in the world at the time and remained a tobacco factory until the 1950s. This building is also the setting for the renowned opera, Carmen, by Bizet. Carmen was a fictional worker in the tobacco factory, the original story being a novella by Prosper Mérimée. This building houses two of the university's faculties: the School of Literature and Philology, and the School of Geography and History.

Other campuses and faculties are located throughout Seville, including the Health Science schools in La Macarena, the Business School in Nervion, the Engineering School and School of Communications in La Cartuja and the Languages Institute (Instituto de Idiomas) and Science Schools in Romina

== Library ==
The library holds about 777,000 volumes.

== Notable people ==
- José María de Azcárate, art historian, author, professor, and academic researcher, specializing in medieval Castilian art and Renaissance sculpture
- Luis Cernuda, poet
- Antonio Cuevas, politician
- Francisco Elías de Tejada y Spínola, philosophy of law professor
- Pastora Filigrana, Roma lawyer, human rights activist, writer
- Baltasar Garzón, judge
- Felipe González, former Prime Minister of the Spanish Government
- Alfonso Guerra, former Deputy Prime Minister of the Spanish Government
- Francisco Manuel de las Heras y Borrero (1951–2013), Spanish historian
- Mark D. Levine, New York City Council member
- Raquel Martínez Rabanal, radio and television hostess
- Manuel Olivencia, professor and lawyer
- Gonzalo Orquín, photographer and painter
- Pedro Salinas, professor and poet
- Stephen Sommers, American writer and director
- Mateo Alemán
- Juan Ramón Jiménez
- Joseph Blanco White
- Pedro Salinas
- María Galiana
- Ana Peláez Narváez, disability rights activist

== See also ==
- List of early modern universities in Europe
