= Sierra de Aracena =

Mountain range in Andalusia, Spain

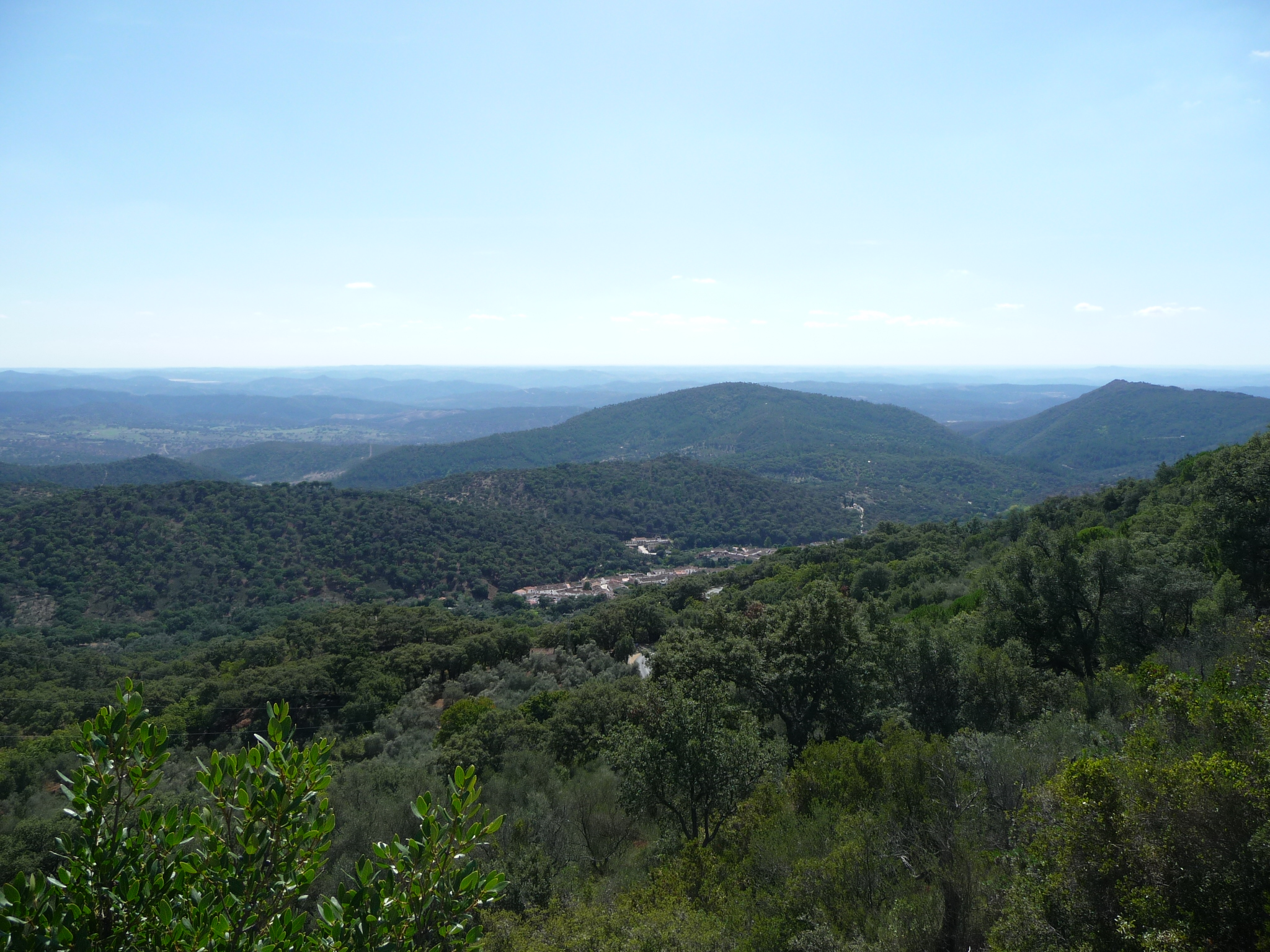
- Landscape of Sierra de Aracena with the ubiquitous small village in the valley

Highest point
- Peak: Cerro del Castaño
- Elevation: 962 m (3,156 ft)
- Coordinates: 33°57′35″N 6°35′7″W

Dimensions
- Length: 58 km (36 mi) NW/SE
- Width: 15 km (9.3 mi) NE/SW

Geography
- Location within Spain
- Location: Andalusia
- Country: Spain
- Range coordinates: 37°54′N 6°37′W
- Parent range: Sierra Morena

Geology
- Orogeny: Variscan orogeny
- Rock age: Paleozoic
- Rock type(s): Schist, slate and quartzite

Sierra de Aracena is the westernmost mountain range of the Sierra Morena, Andalusia, Spain. It is located in the northern part of Huelva Province.

The range is named after the town of Aracena.

== Description ==
The Sierra de Aracena is not very high and its mountains have a gentle, rounded shape. The height of most of the summits lies between 400 and 900 m (1,300 and 3,000 ft). Its highest point is 962 m (3,156 ft) high Cerro del Castaño. Other notable summits are Cerro de San Cristóbal 917 m (3,009 ft) and Cerro de Santa Bárbara 814 m (2,671 ft), the latter located close to Cortegana. The Odiel and Murtigas are the main rivers in the area of the range.

The climate is relatively humid for Andalusian standards and there is a small village in most of the valleys. The undisturbed slopes of the mountains are mostly covered in forest, which is made up of Chestnut, Holm Oak and Cork Oak trees.

== Protected areas ==
The Sierra de Aracena and Picos de Aroche Natural Park is located in the area of the range.

== See also ==
- Dehesa
- Geography of Spain
- Geology of the Iberian Peninsula
