= Francesca Paci =

Italian journalist

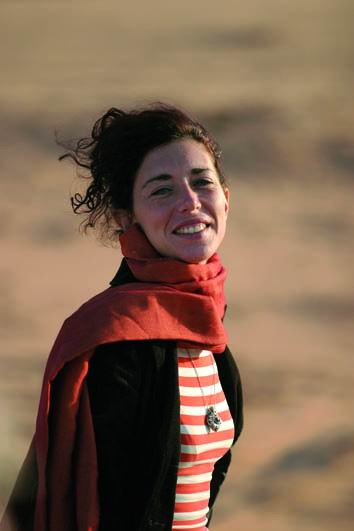
- Born: April 30, 1971 (age 55); Rome, Italy
- Occupation: Journalist

Francesca Paci (born 30 April 1971) is an Italian journalist.

== Biography ==
Paci was born in Rome in 1971. She graduated with a degree in modern literature and worked at the Gazzetta di Mantova before joining La Stampa, Turin's online newspaper, in 2000. Initially, her work focused on local immigration and Islam issues before shifting to foreign affairs and the Middle East. Paci became a correspondent for the paper, working in Jerusalem and London before being based in Rome. In 2007, Paci worked on the La7 television program Nirvana and with Radio Rai3 File Urbani. She also teaches in Rome at the Luiss School of Journalism. Paci has received several awards for her work.

== Awards ==
- 2005: Marco Luchetta International Journalist Award
- 2007: Premiolino Giovani
- 2008: Knight Order of Merit of the Italian Republic
- 2011: Golden Doves Award for Peace
- 2015: Maria Grazia Cutuli Award
- 2018: Fiuggi-Storia Award - Gian Gaspare Napolitano.

== Bibliography ==
- L'Islam sotto casa. Silent integration, (2004)
- Il sonno della ragione, (2004)
- Islam and violence. Italian Muslims speak, (2006)
- Where Christians die. From Egypt to Indonesia, travel to the places where Christianity is a persecuted minority, (2011)
- If I close my eyes I die, (2015)
