= José María Oriol Urquijo =

Spanish politician and businessman (1905–1985)

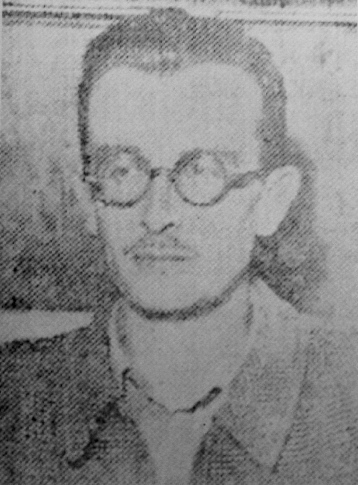
- Born: José María de Oriol y Urquijo; 1905; Santurtzi
- Died: 1985 (aged 79–80); Madrid
- Occupation: business executive
- Known for: businessman, politician
- Political party: CT, FET, UNE, AP

José María de Oriol y Urquijo, 3rd Marquis of Casa Oriol (1905–1985) was a Spanish entrepreneur and a Carlist and Francoist politician. During early Francoism a mayor of Bilbao, he is known mostly for his business activity, especially for his role in the Spanish energy industry, Talgo train development and the banking sector. He is counted among the most influential Spanish business managers of the 20th century.

== Family and youth ==
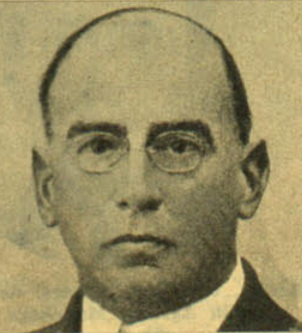
José Luis Oriol

José María Lucas Eusebio de Oriol y Urquijo was born to a distinguished family of Catalan origins, its first members noted in the history of Spain in the 17th century. Buenaventura de Oriol y Salvador sided with the legitimists during the First Carlist War. In recognition of his merits the claimant awarded him with Marquesado de Oriol in 1870; he was elected to the Cortes in 1872. The son of his brother and José María's paternal grandfather, José María de Oriol y Gordo (1845-1899), the native of Tortosa, joined Carlos VII during the Third Carlist War and served as jefe de Ayudantes of general Dorregaray. Following the amnesty he settled in Bilbao and married descendant of a local high bourgeoisie Urigüen family. His son and José María's father, José Luis de Oriol y Urigüen (1877-1972), emerged as a Carlist political mogul in Álava, withdrawing from active politics after the Civil War. Having wedded Catalina de Urquijo y Vitórica, descendant to a liberal oligarchic family controlling much of the Biscay finance, he married into enormous wealth. In the early 20th century he replaced his father-in-law as CEO of Hidroeléctrica Española and in 1942 was co-founder of Talgo; he is considered one of the most important Spanish entrepreneurs of the 20th century. In 1958 he was declared 2nd marquis of Oriol.

José Luis and Catalina initially lived in Biscay, but they soon moved to Madrid. The couple had 8 children, all brought up in a fervently religious ambience; José María was the oldest one. Though born in the Vascongadas, he was raised in the capital, frequenting the Jesuit Areneros college in Chamartin district until obtaining bachillerato in 1922. Raised to be the future head of the family and especially key person to manage its huge and complex business, he entered the Madrid Escuela de Ingenieros Industriales. His studies progressed with some difficulty and were interrupted by military service in 1926-7; he resumed academic career as unenrolled student and graduated as engineer in 1928. A sportsman, he played football in Atlético Madrid and won local Biscay laurels in tennis.

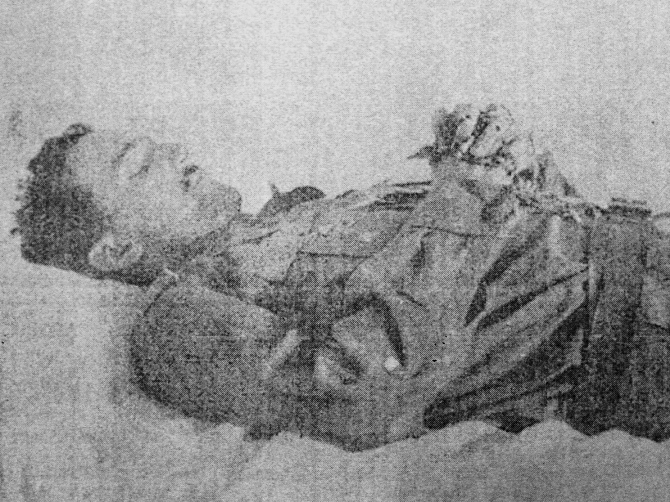
Corpse of Fernando Oriol

In 1929 José María married a sevillana, María Gracia Ibarra y Lasso de la Vega (1908-1981), daughter of 3rd conde de Ibarra. The couple had 7 children, José Luis (1930), María de Gracia (1931), Miguel (1933), Iñigo (1934), Maria del dulce Nombre (1937) Carlos (1940), and Begoña. José Luis, Iñigo and Carlos were active in family business and became recognized nationwide as entrepreneurs, while Miguel made his name as architect, author of Torre de Europa. His daughter and José María's granddaughter, Mónica de Oriol Icaza, until 2015 headed the Spanish Círculo de Empresarios. Brothers of José María grew to top Francoist dignitaries; Antonio María served as minister of justice (1965-1973) and president of Consejo de Estado (1973-1979), while Lucas was consejero nacional of FET until its dissolution, both active also as successful entrepreneurs. Another brother, Fernando, died as Carlist requeté volunteer.

== Carlist ==
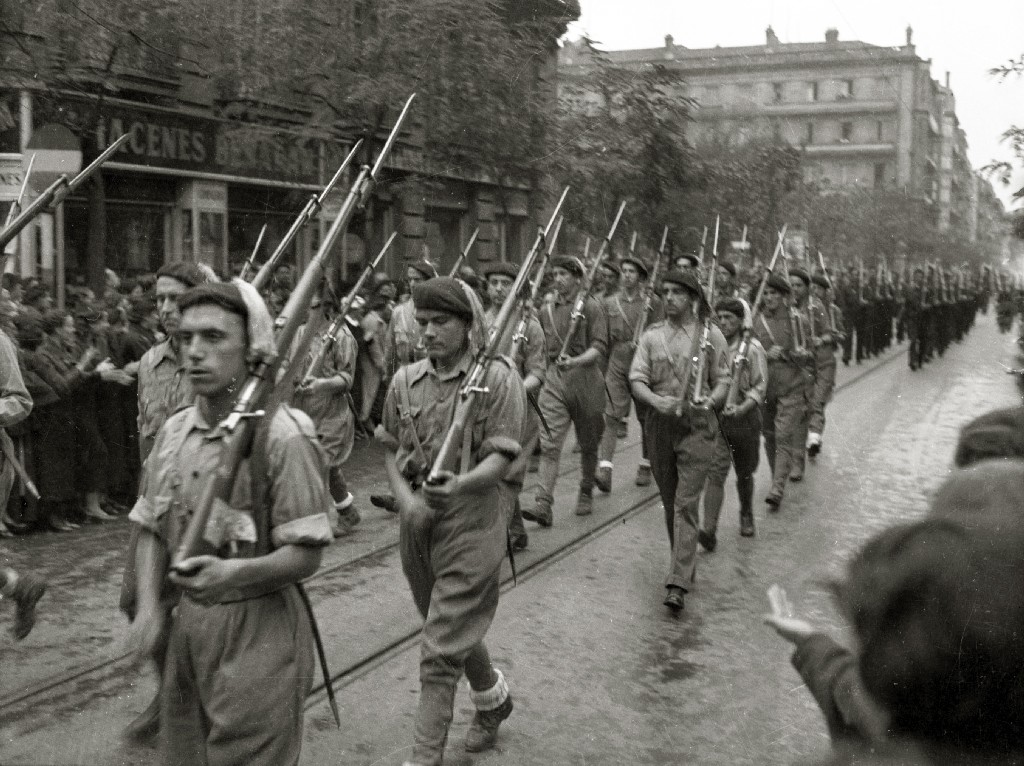
Requeté on parade, 1936

Though some authors suggest that Oriol from the onset sympathized with Carlism, none of the sources consulted confirms (or denies) that he was active in Carlist structures prior to 1931. However, when 3 branches of Traditionalism united in Comunión Tradicionalista, in May 1932 José María was nominated to its Junta Vasco-Navarra. Following re-organization of 1934 he was nominated assessor of Delegación Especial de Juventudes. He is known mostly as supporting own father, successfully organising his electoral campaigns in Álava. In 1936 Oriol became member of Junta Militar, a Saint-Jean-de-Luz based executive of Carlist conspiracy. As a party envoy a few times he met the imprisoned José Antonio Primo de Rivera, negotiating details of a would-be Carlist and Falangist insurgent alliance. Locally he served as a link between his parent and head of the military plot in Álava, teniente coronel Alonso Vega. During the coup Oriol was in Bilbao, where the rebels failed; he went into hiding and left the city on a ship, disguised as a foreigner.

Having made it to the Nationalist zone Oriol resumed his duties in Carlist military executive, late August nominated member of Junta Nacional Carlista de Guerra; some sources claim he was heading the Investigación y Información section, some claim he directed the transport section. It is not clear whether Oriol carried on with these duties when in November 1936 he was nominated alférez provisional and joined an unidentified Carlist requeté battalion from Álava; his 2 brothers were already serving as requeté volunteers. He is known as present in Andalusia in early 1937; it is not clear whether he took part in any combat activities before moving from the front units to directing Radio Requeté. In February and March 1937 he took part in the Carlist gatherings in Insua and Burgos, intended to discuss the looming threat of a forceful amalgamation within a state party. Together with his father, Oriol advocated acceptance of what looked like a unification ultimatum from Franco; in the last-minute attempt to stage an internal coup within Carlism, he was proposed to be head of Sección Administrativa.

Carlist standard

Following the Nationalist conquest of all Vascongadas in June 1937 he was nominated the first jefe of FET y de las JONS in Biscay, one of 9 Carlists out of 31 provincial nominees; on this position he kept supporting the Navarrese Carlist junta financially. Franco preferred not to appointed Oriol in Álava, sort of local fiefdom of his father, in what seemed like playing son against father in a bid to terminate the alavese "oriolismo". In October 1937 as one of 12 Carlists he was appointed to the Falangist Consejo Nacional; it is not clear whether he entered the FET 9-member executive, Junta Política. The Carlist regent-claimant Don Javier demanded that his subjects do not accept; as carlo-francoists refused to follow the royal order, most of them were expelled from Carlism.

== Political climax ==
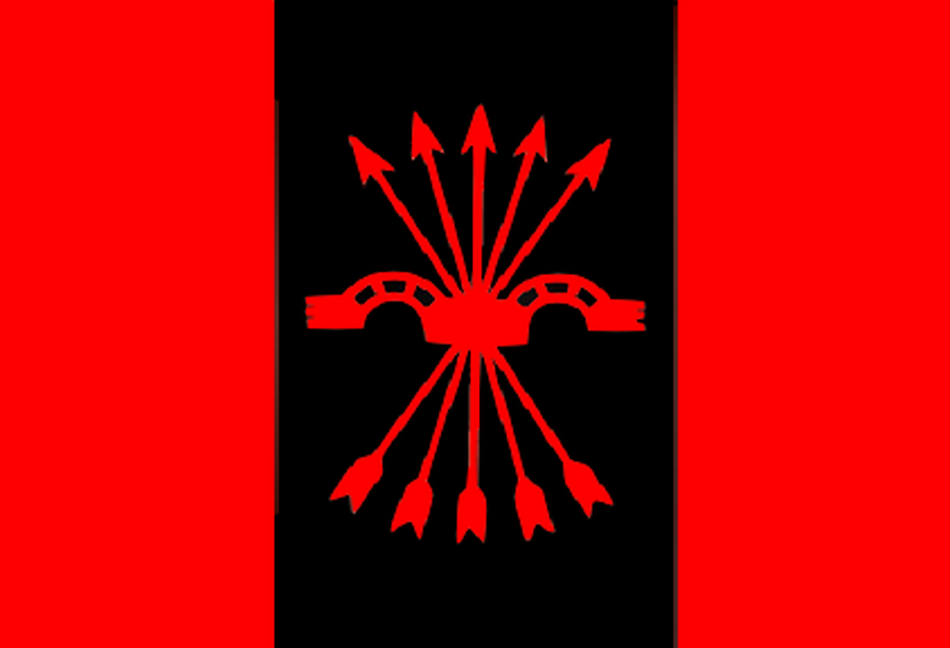
Falangist standard

Turn of the decades produced the climax of Oriol's political career, marked mostly by his vacillation between Carlism and Falangism. Re-admitted to semi-legal Traditionalist structures, at the same time as provincial FET jefe he was busy laying the foundations of the Francoist regime, especially supervising personal policy, mobilizing support and ensuring compliance. Increasingly perplexed by syndicalist preponderance over Carlism in the new party, he demonstrated unease; a single source claims that in early 1938 he resigned from Junta Política and together with other collaborative Carlists personally protested to Franco. In 1939 he spoke against a Serrano-sponsored draft, intended to ensure totalitarian nature of Falangist domination.

In April 1939 Oriol was nominated mayor of Bilbao, later that year re-appointed to Consejo Nacional and Junta Política. Together with the Valencia alcalde, Joaquín Manglano y Cucaló, he was one of two Carlist mayors of major urban centres. As alcalde he was considered part of "neguridad", the affluent bourgeoisie group related to the resort of Neguri. He is recognized as effective at gaining official subsidies and credits, having repaired most war damages and commenced major new initiatives, like construction of new bridges across the Nervion and re-setting of the Gran Via. The most notable transport projects were the launch of the first municipal trolleybus network in Spain and construction of the Sondica airport; the former ended in failure, the latter turned into a lasting investment. Starting 1940 he initiated public works intended to address unemployment problem, resulting from collapse of European coal market following the outbreak of the Second World War. The municipal budget was kept well under control. Oriol contributed also to Bilbao sport by donating the San Mamés football ground, formally owned by the city, to the Athletic Club.

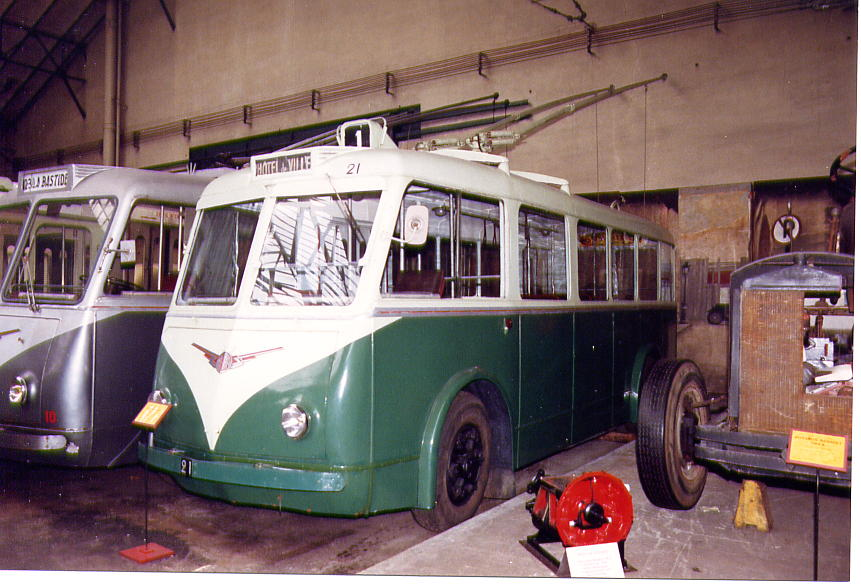
Vetra CS 55, first Bilbao trolleybus

Oriol's tenure in Bilbao was marked by continuing political ambivalence. He excelled in organising venerating celebrations of Franco and forged good working relationship with the Falangist civil governor of the province, Manuel Ganuza, himself a protégé of Serrano Suñer. On the other hand, he blocked hardline Falangist initiatives, never appeared in blue shirt, added a decisively Carlist flavor to his public style and indeed was reported as turning Biscay into a Carlist fiefdom. He fought whatever was left of Basque nationalism, but permitted Carlism-styled Basque feasts. As a result, he was disdained by both the Carlists and the Falangists. Oriol's rapport with a new civil governor, the former Carlist Juan Granell Pascual, was very poor and most Traditionalists viewed him as a traitor. The Falangist rank-and-file resented him as well, the syndicalist radicals perfectly aware of his high bourgeoisie profile. In December 1940 he ceased as provincial FET jefe and in February 1941 as alcalde of Bilbao; his fate was conscious decision rather than a fall from grace. Oriol was appreciated by Franco for his loyalty and remained one of the few with fairly easy access to the dictator.

== Between juanismo, franquismo and carlismo ==
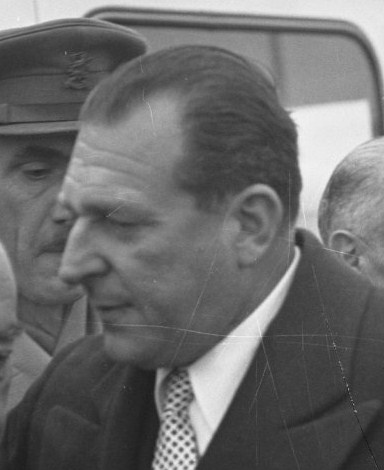
Juan de Borbón, 1958

Since 1936 leaning towards a dynastical pact between the Carlists and the Alfonsists, in 1943 Oriol met Don Juan for the first time and kept advocating him as a compromise royal candidate. In 1945 he emerged as key liaison between caudillo and the Alfonsist claimant, attempting to arrange a meeting between the two. Unlike most Juanista negotiators he did not intend to outsmart the dictator. Genuinely committed to Franco, instead of restoration he opted for a new, authoritarian monarchy.

As negotiator Oriol seemed unsuccessful; Don Juan's 1945 Manifest of Lausanne enraged Franco and his 1946 "Bases de Estoril" declaration was rejected by Don Javier; Oriol did not enter Don Juan's Consejo Privado, formed in 1947. However, gradually his efforts started to bear fruit. Some claim that the 1948 meeting between Franco and Don Juan was arranged mostly by Oriol, opening a path for the Alfonsist restoration. In case of the Carlists negotiations produced a schism. In 1957 he joined a large group of juanista-minded Carlist politicians, concerned about growing dynamics of the javieristas, and formally abandoned Don Javier declaring Don Juan the legitimate Traditionalist king. Though he remained on good terms with the claimant, little is known about Oriol's relation with his son, Juan Carlos.

Ideologically Oriol remained an ultraconservative Catholic monarchist. A number of times he spoke against separation of state and the Church, envisioned sort of reversal of mid-19th century desamortización, opposed parliamentary elections and despised syndicalism, claiming that representation should be exercised by traditional social bodies. In the 1940s convinced that the Francoist regime must evolve towards an authoritarian monarchical solution, in the 1950s he realized that this path was a long-time perspective. In 1955 he entered the Francoist Cortes and remained appointed to 6 successive legislatures also in 1958, 1961, 1964, 1967 and 1971. Oriol did not consider the quasi-parliament a forum of political exchange and approached it as a mere technical body of the regime. He was a number of times considered a ministerial candidate, in 1961 Lopez Rodó suggested him as member of Consejo del Reino.

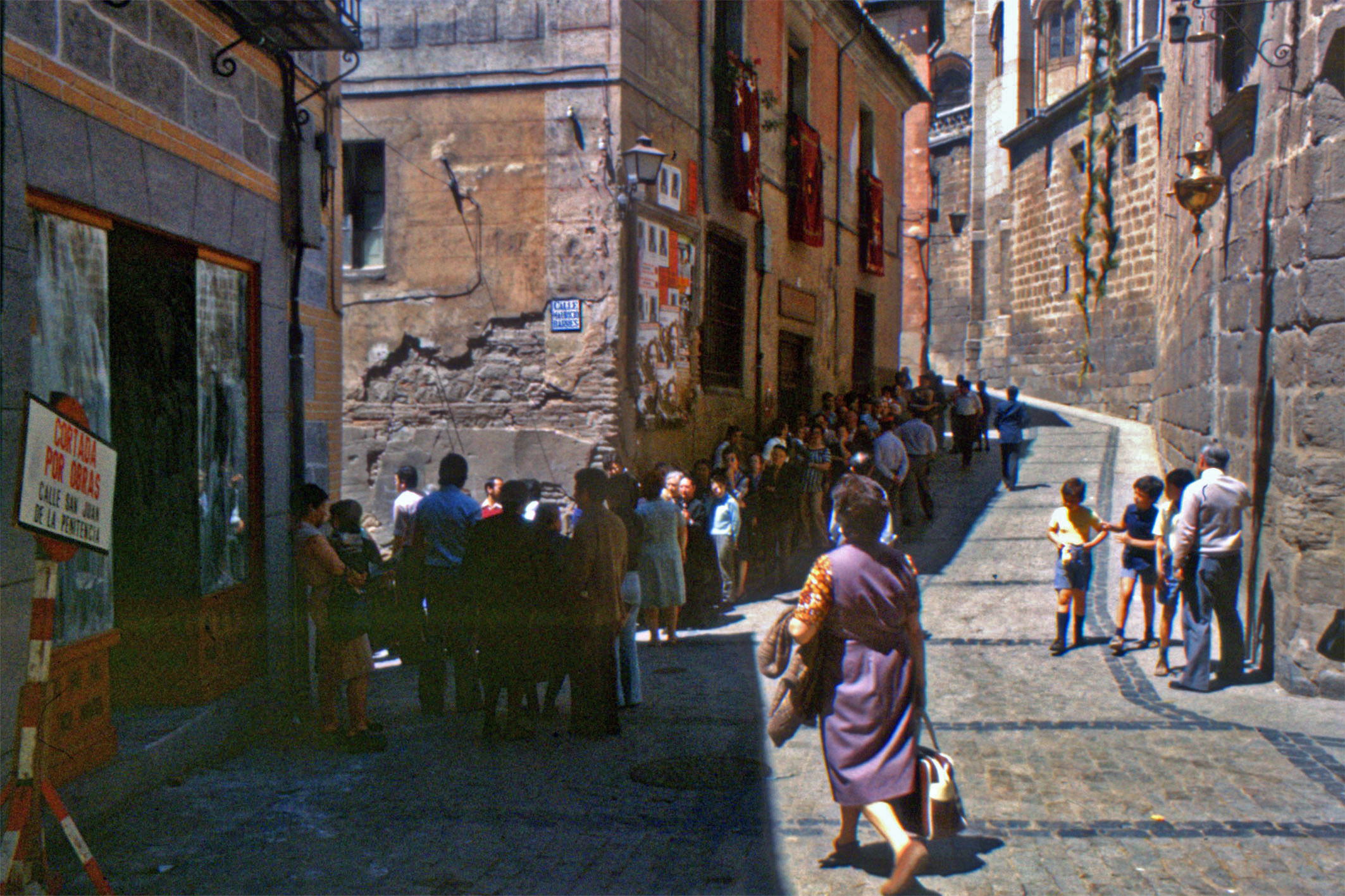
Elections in Spain, 1977

With his monarchical efforts crowned in 1969 Oriol assumed a moderately reformist stance. He was active in ANEPA, a think-tank intending to ensure continuity of the system by introducing its timid rectifications. When political associations were discussed in the early 1970s he pondered upon creating a Carlist one. Eventually he joined Unión Nacional Española, and in 1976 he moved with the whole party to Alianza Popular; he protested the constitutional plans of Suarez. The same year he voted against Ley para la Reforma Política. In 1977 he co-registered the Carlist grouping loyal to Don Sixto, Comunión Tradicionalista. In 1982 he was suspected of taking part in conspiracy known as 27-Q; no charge was formally raised. Holding vital business posts he remained on ice-cold terms with socialist government officials responsible for the energy sector.

== Patriarca de las eléctricas ==
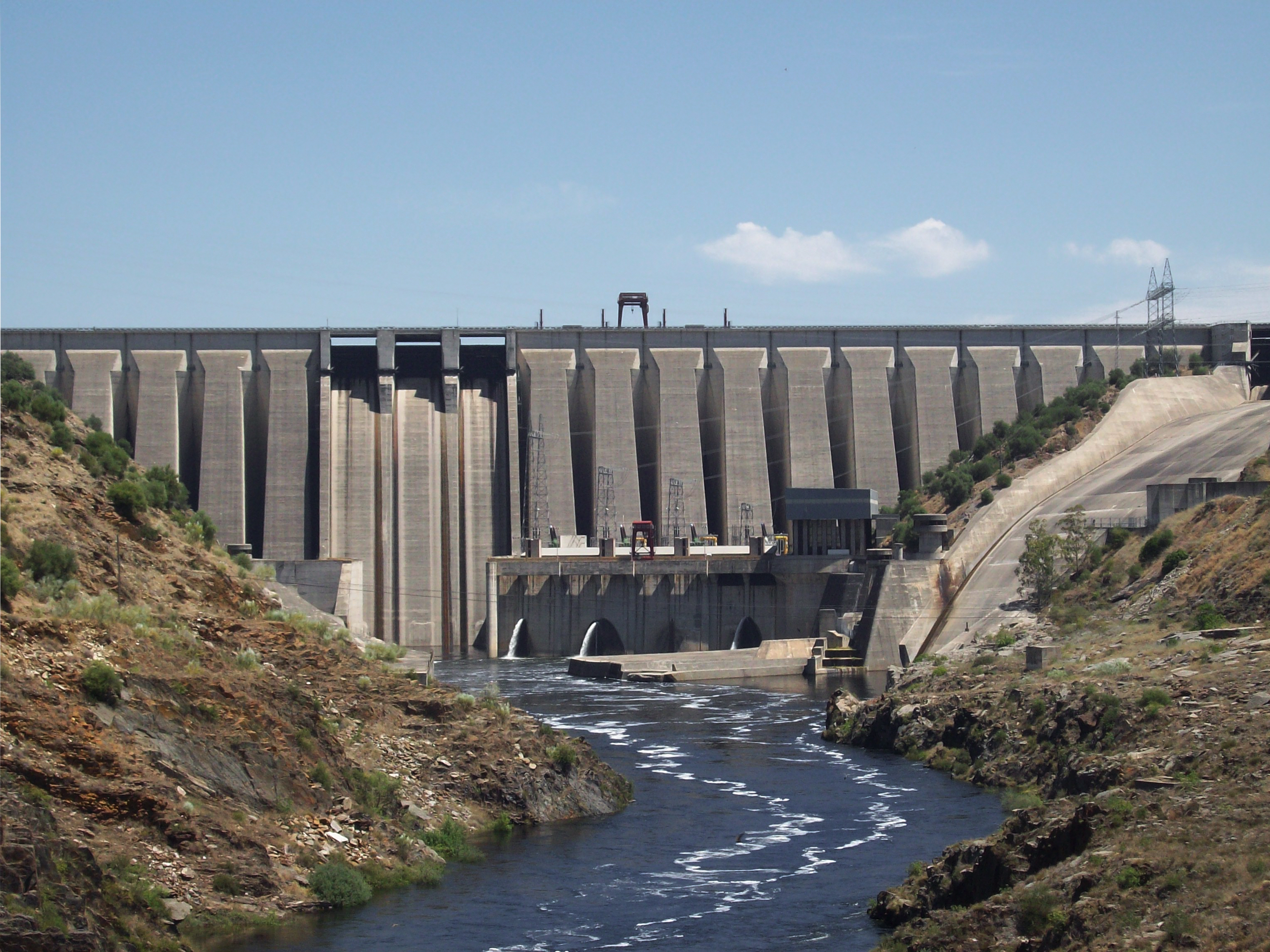
José María de Oriol dam

There is little doubt that Oriol's key business focus was on Hidroeléctrica Española; he entered its Consejo de Administración in 1928, its Comisión Ejecutiva in 1930 and became its president in 1941, the post held until 1985. When he commenced at the helm of the company it served 0,3m customers and produced 559m kWh annually, almost all generated by hydropower; when he resigned, the company served 7m customers, produced 14.773m kWh and was dependent in 28% on hydropower, in 48% on conventional thermal plants and in 24% on nuclear energy. Its major business development thread was gradual shift of focus to the Tagus river; with 6 dams constructed, in the 1970s the river provided 70% of the HE hydropower. Another key project was diversification of energy sources, commenced by the 1957 construction of the Escombreras thermal power plant near Cartagena. This path was followed further on in the late 1960s; for 20 years a proponent of nuclear energy, Oriol led HE into joint venture conglomerates which constructed the Almaraz, Cofrentes and Valdecaballeros nuclear power plants. Last years of his presidency were dedicated mostly to conflict related to Valdecaballeros, confronting governmental regulatory plans and proceeding with interchange of assets among companies forming Unesa. He stepped down as iconic industry and corporate figure with only few failures recorded.

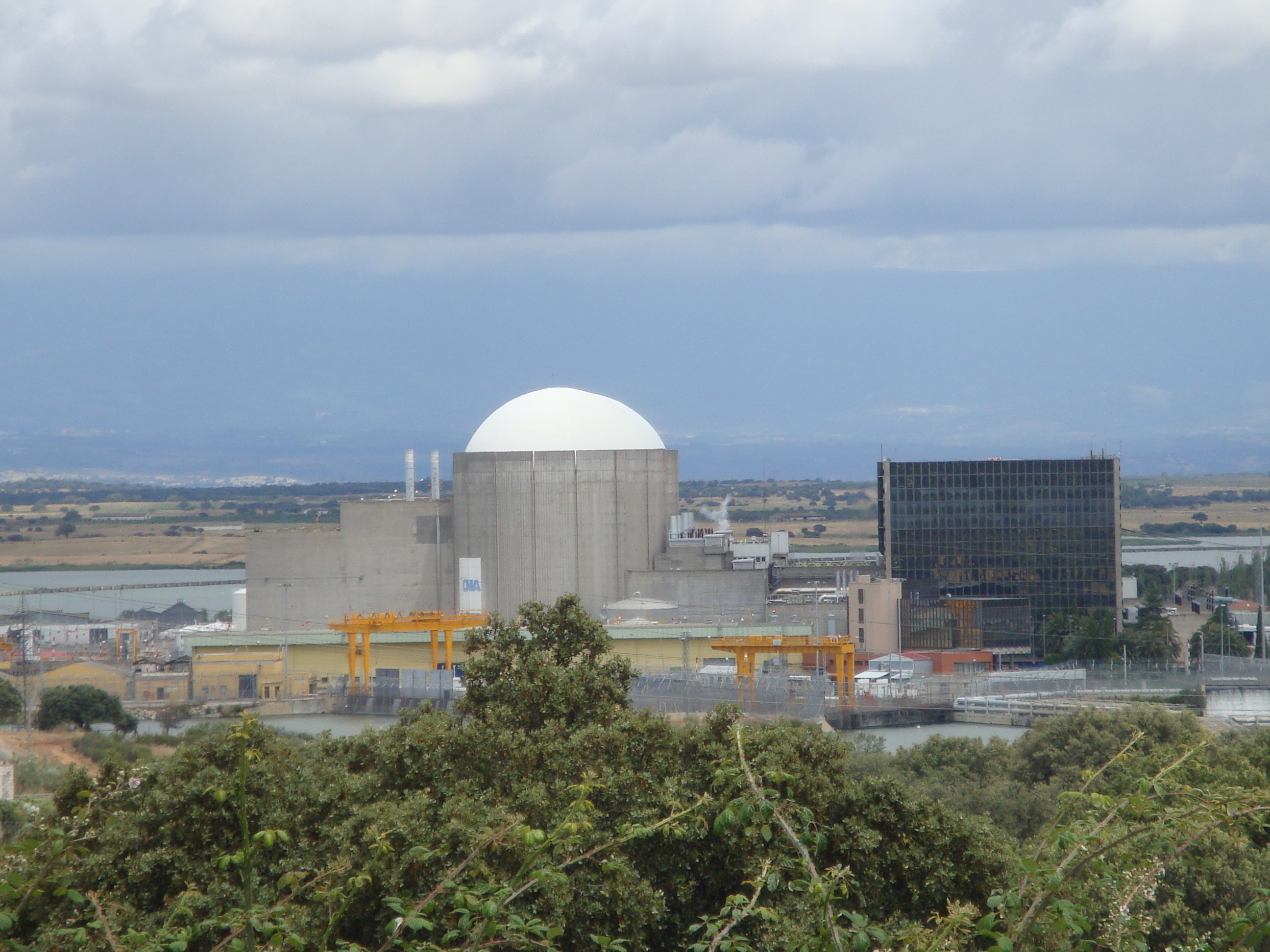
Nuclear power plant in Almaraz, Extremadura

Apart from activities in various HE subsidiaries and in Electras Marroquies, a family owned company he managed from 1941, another major thread of Oriol's energy business was Unesa. In the early 1940s he was consumed by negotiations between private energy producers, totally dominating on the Spanish market, and Instituto Nacional de Industria. Anxious that the governmental project would reduce commercial companies to marginal role, he was the moving spirit and the first president of Unidad Eléctrica (Unesa), an industry cartel set up in 1944 by 18 energy producers. It was conceived not as a challenge to official plans, but as a complementary offer to reformat the energy utility market. Personally guaranteeing viability of the scheme to Franco, Oriol kept clashing with Suanzez and INI; when his term expired in 1949 the threat of nationalization was largely averted and Unesa recorded enormous progress in terms of integrating private energy network, previously a patchy structure of overproduction and unmet demand areas. Also later on, as HE representative in Unesa and as informal representative of private energy sector, he kept confronting INI plans of state domination on the energy utilities market, though the pressure eased after the mid-1950s. When the rotating Unesa presidency again passed to HE, in 1973-1977 Oriol served his second term as its head; in the late 1970s and early 1980s he again stood to fight off governmental consolidation plans, this time advanced by democratic cabinets.

== Other business and public engagements ==
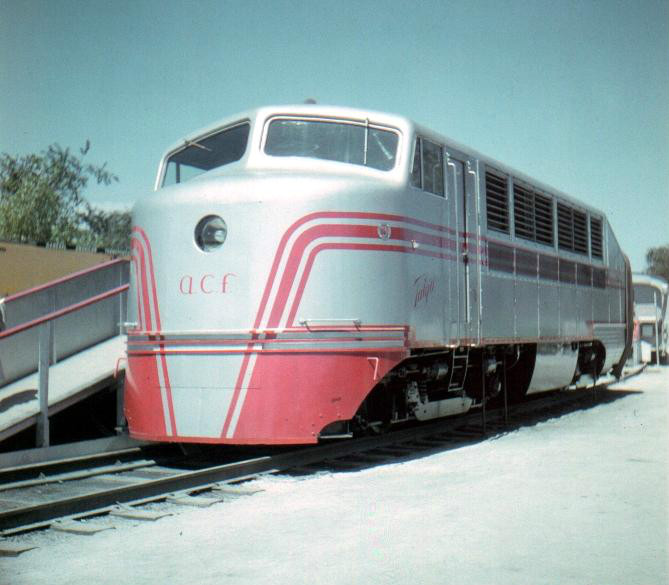
ACF Talgo locomotive, 1948

As in mid-1940s TALGO transformed into the Oriol family business, José María was heavily engaged in technical work related to construction of the rolling stock. Since the company was incapable of addressing the problems domestically, production was developed in the United States, with Oriol spending months at American Car and Foundry in New York. In the early 1950s he was supervising development works until Talgo II entered commercial service. As his father and brother, primary managers of the company, stepped down in the mid-1950s, in 1955 José María assumed presidency of the board and in 1957 he became CEO of the company. His key projects were launching own rolling stock factories in Aravaca and Rivabellosa, constructing new generation bi-directional train Talgo III and negotiating co-operation details with Renfe. Talgo served also as a show-case, intended to prove modernizing capacity of the regime and its industrial prowess. Oriol remained at the helm of the company until his death.

In 1941 Oriol entered Consejo de Administración of Banesto, which reflected financial engagement of the bank in Talgo. Though initially banking duties were very time consuming, Oriol has never considered them his prime activity. He saw his role as representative of the shareholders rather than a manager, supervising financial and operational soundness rather than setting the strategy and running the daily business. He remained in Banesto board until death, periodically entering executive bodies of its daughter banks. With other family members he also co-owned large agricultural estates in the South of Spain.

In 1961 Oriol was elected president of Asociación Nacional de Ingenieros Industriales, the function held until the following year he became head of Instituto de Ingenieros Civiles de España, a supreme corporate organization grouping all engineering branches. At this job he was involved in discussions on professional certificates, technical education, internal organization of the engineer corps and some specific questions related to national economy, like future of the nuclear energy in Spain. Re-elected 2 times, he stepped down in 1971. Invited in 1959, he formally entered Real Academia de Ciencias Morales y Políticas as académico de número in 1961, in course of 24 years having taken part in 396 of its sessions. He also briefly directed Centro de Estudios Europeos and Comisión de Intercambio Cultural España-EE.UU.

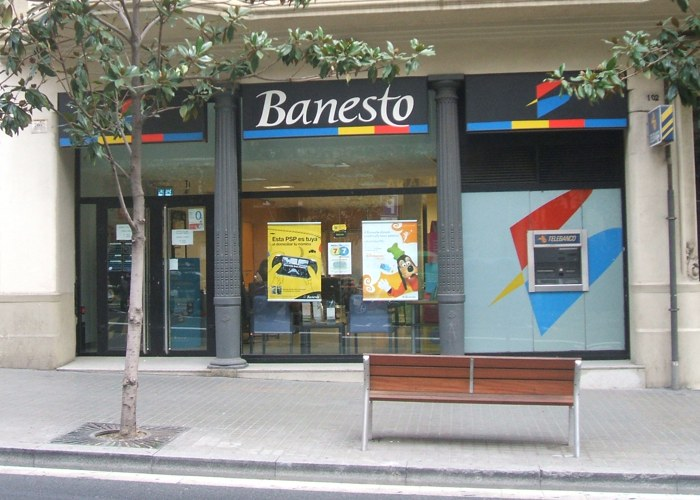
Banesto office

Together with other members of Oriol, Ibarra and Urquijo families he formed part of one of the most powerful Spanish oligarchic groups. He is noted as exemplary case of Spanish entrepreneur who took advantage of his political profile, thriving in a peculiar business environment of Francoism. His management style is described as bold, decisive and even authoritarian, also towards other family members. Endurance, scope and complexity of Oriol-ran businesses, combined with his personal vision, energy and innovative knack, earned him place among the 100 most important Spanish entrepreneurs of the 20th century. He was awarded a number of Spanish and international honors, since 1959 officially acknowledged as 3rd marqués de Casa Oriol.

== See also ==
- Carlism
- Carlo-francoism
- Talgo
- Hidroelectrica Espanola
- Francoism
- José Luis de Oriol y Urigüen
- Antonio María de Oriol y Urquijo
