= Catalan Regional Action =

Catalan Regional Action Acció Regional Catalana
- President: Laureano López Rodó
- Founder: Laureano López Rodó
- Founded: December 16, 1976
- Dissolved: 1977^{1}
- Succeeded by: People's Alliance of Catalonia
- Headquarters: Barcelona, Catalonia, Spain
- Ideology: Regionalism; Conservatism; Christian humanism Monarchism
- Political position: Centre-right
- National affiliation: Regional Action
- Politics of Catalonia; Political parties; Elections^{1}Integrated into People's Alliance

Catalan Regional Action (Catalan: Acció Regional Catalana, Spanish: Acción Regional Catalana, ARC) was a small centre-right political party in Catalonia, Spain. It was the Catalan affiliate of the Spanish Regional Action party.

== See also ==
- Regional Action
- People's Alliance
