= Democratic Reform =

Democratic Reform Reforma Democrática
- Abbreviation: RD
- President: Manuel Fraga
- Secretary-General: Carlos Argos
- Founded: 1976
- Dissolved: 1977
- Split from: FET y de las JONS
- Merged into: People's Alliance
- Headquarters: Madrid, Spain
- Ideology: Conservatism; Post-Francoism; Monarchism; Spanish nationalism
- Political position: Right-wing
- National affiliation: People's Alliance

Democratic Reform (Spanish: Reforma Democrática; RD) was a conservative and Spanish nationalist political party in Spain led by Manuel Fraga, associated to technocratic milieus within the Francoist regime. It coalesced together with other post-Francoist proto-parties in the creation of People's Alliance (AP), effectively dissolving in 1977 upon the latter electoral coalition's transformation into a full-fledged political party.

== History ==
=== Background ===
Under the Law of Political Associations approved by the Francoist Cortes Españolas in 1974, which, for the first time, authorized the creation of structures of political participation (political associations), as long as they were loyal to the principles of the Movimiento Nacional. Different moderate sectors of Francoist Spain were organized under the leadership of Manuel Fraga Iribarne, in order to form a conservative political group oriented to a limited reform of the Franco system.

With that end, the Cabinet for Guidance and Documentation (Godsa) was created in Madrid. GODSA published the documents: Libro Blanco para la Reforma Democrática and Llamamiento para una Reforma Democrática. Both documents formed the basis for RD, that was registered in the Registry of Political Associations of the Interior Ministry in October 1976, as a political association.

=== Democratic Reform and People's Alliance ===
In December of that same year (1976) the First National Congress of RD, which elected Manuel Fraga Iribarne as its president and Carlos Argos García as the general secretary, was held.

In parallel with the deployment of Democratic Reform, Manuel Fraga Iribarne established contacts with other, relatively, moderate members of Francoist Spain, including former ministers and Laureano López Rodó and Federico Silva Muñoz. These contacts, culminating in the creation of the People's Alliance, divided the members of RD, some of which, as Gabriel Cisneros, left the project in January to protest the prospect of integration with other groups of the Francoist right.

On 5, 6 and 7 March 1977 the Constituent Congress of AP as a political party was held in Madrid. The political associations that participated in the Congress were dissolved, including Democratic Reform, in the new party.

== People linked with RD ==
- Manuel Fraga Iribarne, former Minister of Information and Tourism, founder and leader of AP (secretary general and president), draftsman of the 1978 Constitution and former President of Galicia (1989-2005).
- Gabriel Cisneros, rapporteur of the 1978 Constitution, leader of the Union of the Democratic Centre, the Liberal Party and the People's Party.
- Francisco Álvarez Cascos, former secretary general of AP, former Minister of Development, former Deputy Prime Minister and former President of the Principality of Asturias (2011-2012).
- Juan de Arespacochaga, mayor of Madrid between 1976 and 1978, senator by Royal nomination in 1977 and later a member of AP.
