= Antonio María Oriol Urquijo =

Spanish politician (1913–1996)

Antonio María de Oriol
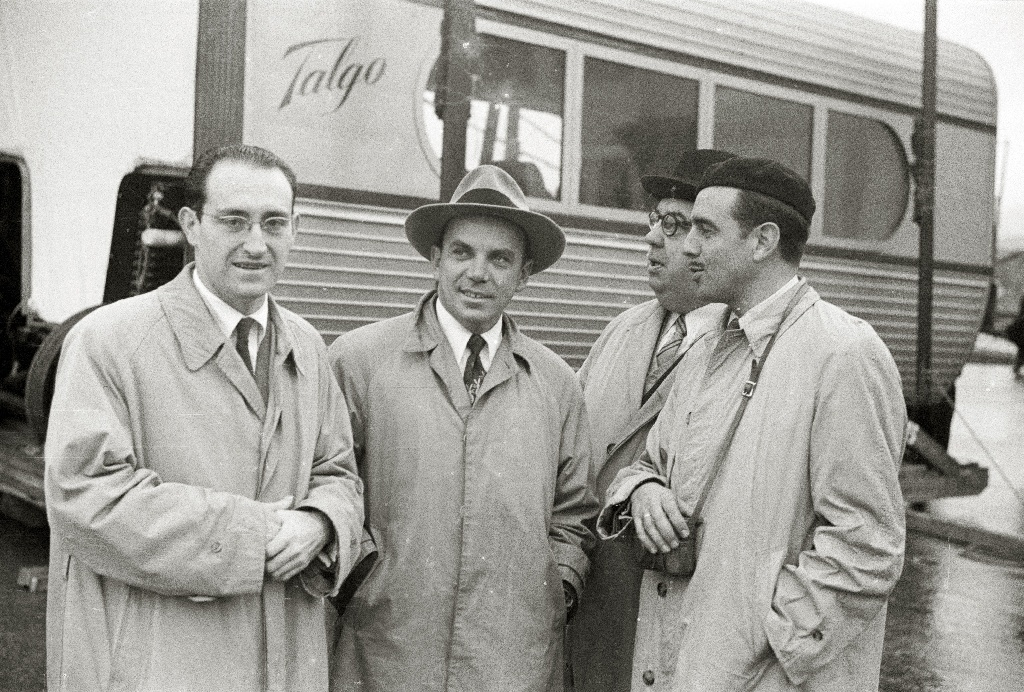
- Born: Antonio María de Oriol y Urquijo; 1913; Getxo, Spain
- Died: 1996 (aged 82–83); Madrid, Spain
- Occupations: official, businessman
- Known for: politician
- Political party: Carlism, FET, UNE

Antonio María de Oriol y Urquijo (1913–1996) was a Spanish politician and businessman. Politically he supported the Traditionalist cause, first as a Carlist militant and then as a Francoist official. In 1955–1977 he was a member of Cortes Españolas; in 1957–1965 he headed the welfare department in the Ministry of Interior; in 1965–1973 he served as the Minister of Justice; in 1973–1978 he was a member of the Council of the Realm and in 1973–1979 he presided over the Council of State. As businessman he was active in companies controlled by the Oriol family, holding executive positions in Iberdrola, Patentes Talgo and other entities.

== Family and youth ==
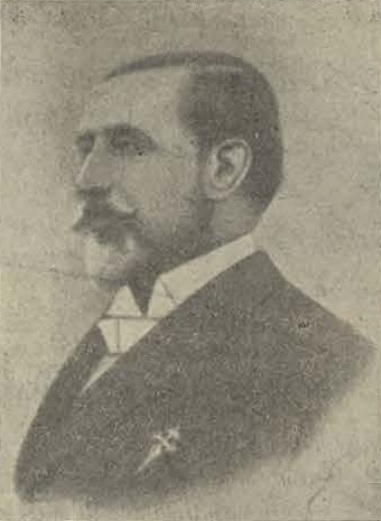
grandfather

Antonio Oriol was born to a family of Catalan origins, its first members noted in the history of Spain in the 17th century. Buenaventura Oriol Salvador sided with the legitimists during the First Carlist War. In recognition of his merits the claimant awarded him with Marquesado de Oriol in 1870; he was elected to the Cortes in 1872. The son of his brother and Antonio's paternal grandfather, José María Oriol Gordo (1845–1899), a native of Tortosa, joined Carlos VII during the Third Carlist War and served as Jefe de Ayudantes of general Dorregaray. Following the amnesty he settled in Bilbao and married descendant to a local high bourgeoisie Urigüen family. His son and Antonio's father, José Luis Oriol Urigüen (1877–1972), in the mid-1930s emerged as a Carlist political mogul in Álava. He wed Catalina de Urquijo y Vitórica, descendant to an oligarchic family which controlled much of the Biscay finance. In the early 20th century Oriol Urigüen replaced his father-in-law as CEO of Hidroeléctrica Española and later developed a number of other businesses; he is considered one of the most important Spanish entrepreneurs of the 20th century.

José Luis and Catalina initially lived in a family estate in Getxo, the affluent suburb of Bilbao and hub of the oligarchic Basque bourgeoisie; however, they soon moved to Madrid. The couple had 8 children, all brought up in great wealth but also in a fervently religious ambience; Antonio was born as the fourth son; he had also a younger brother. It is not clear whether like at least one of his older brothers, he frequented a Jesuit high school in the capital. At unspecified time though probably in the early 1930s he enrolled at Department of Law at the Madrid university and graduated in juridical sciences in 1935. He prepared to join the family business but did so no sooner that after the Civil War.

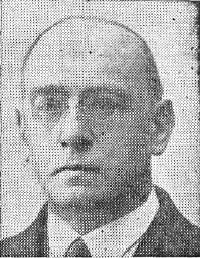
father

In 1940 Antonio Oriol married María de la Soledad Díaz de Bustamante y Quijano (died 1990). She descended from a wealthy Cantabrian family of entrepreneurs, though her father – who married into another industrial fortune – lived already in Madrid. The couple settled at the grand Oriol family estate near Majadahonda; it was shared with Antonio's brothers, two of them – Lucas and especially José María – growing to high Francoist officials and business tycoons. Antonio and Soledad had seven children; all the sons became high corporate executives, but they did not engage in politics. The daughter María married Miguel Primo de Rivera y Urquijo, grandson of the dictator and later one of key people behind the Spanish transition to democracy. Among 39 of Oriol's grandchildren the best known is Rocio Primo de Rivera Oriol, author of few fiction and history books; her brother Fernando gained attention in 2019 when claiming ducado de Primo de Rivera. Most of the grandchildren are well set in the world of Spanish societé and business; in 2020 the Oriol family clan was listed as the 180. richest family in Spain.

== Early public engagements and civil war (before 1940) ==
Carlist standard

Antonio's mother descended from a well known Basque family of liberal convictions, but four generations of his paternal ancestors were related to Traditionalism, even though his father adhered to a generic conservative monarchism and politically engaged in Carlism only in his 50s. Like his three older brothers, Antonio inherited legitimist preferences from forefathers and during his student years in Madrid he was active in the Carlist academic organisation, Agrupación Escolar Tradicionalista; none of the sources consulted provides information on any roles he might have performed. According to one author already in his teens he enlisted to the paramilitary Requeté organisation and remained involved in its ranks throughout all of the Republic years. Officially he was noted in the press as donating to Catholic charity and in secondary roles during some Carlist rallies in Madrid.

Oriol was engaged in Carlist anti-republican conspiracy of the spring of 1936. He was assigned to join the coup in Álava; on July 18 he hid in Palacio Verástegui in Vitoria. He planned to join the military, supposed to rise the following day. Indeed, the Vitoria-based sub-units of the 5th Mountain Regiment “Flandes” did rise and the city was swiftly seized by the rebels. Early Oriol's military assignment is not clear; it is known that in mid-September he served in requeté troops which took San Sebastián. Since later this month he was seconded to the 2nd Requeté Company, incorporated into the 3rd Battalion of the Flandes Regiment; it was deployed North to Vitoria, in the mountain range which separated Alava from Western parts of Gipuzkoa, controlled by the loyalists. In October 1936 the unit took part in heavy fightings on the Isusquiza hill. Antonio was hit and taken to the rear; few days later on the same section his brother Fernando was mortally wounded.

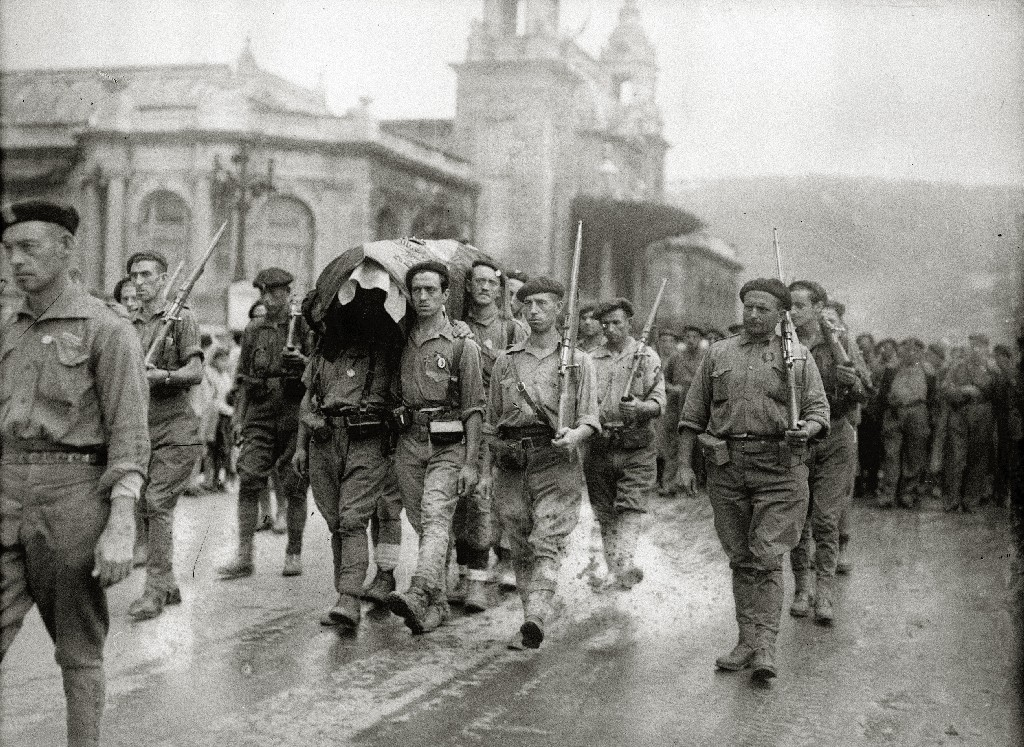
funeral of Fernando Oriol

Following recovery in November Oriol was seconded to the alferéz provisional course in Burgos; already as provisional lieutenant he joined the 2nd Company, deployed to unblock encircled Villarreal de Álava, in December. In the first half of 1937 the unit engaged in the Biscay campaign; shuttled to the central front it took part in the battle of Brunete in July. In September, renamed to 8th Requeté Company of Álava, it was deployed in Cantabria; during later combat in Asturias Oriol was already commanding the 1st Section. Following the Northern campaign the company took part in victory parade in Vitoria, to be shuttled to Teruel by the end of 1937. Oriol was wounded for the second time near Mata de los Olmos in March 1938; treated in the hospital, he re-joined his unit in June at the Castellón front. He commanded the section during heavy fightings in Sierra de Pandols during the Battle of Ebro; the campaign earned him an individual Military Medal. In December 1938 the company was deployed in Huesca, to take part in the Catalonia offensive in early 1939. In March promoted to capitán de infantería, Oriol finished the war commanding his unit near Cartagena.

== Businessman (1940–1955) ==
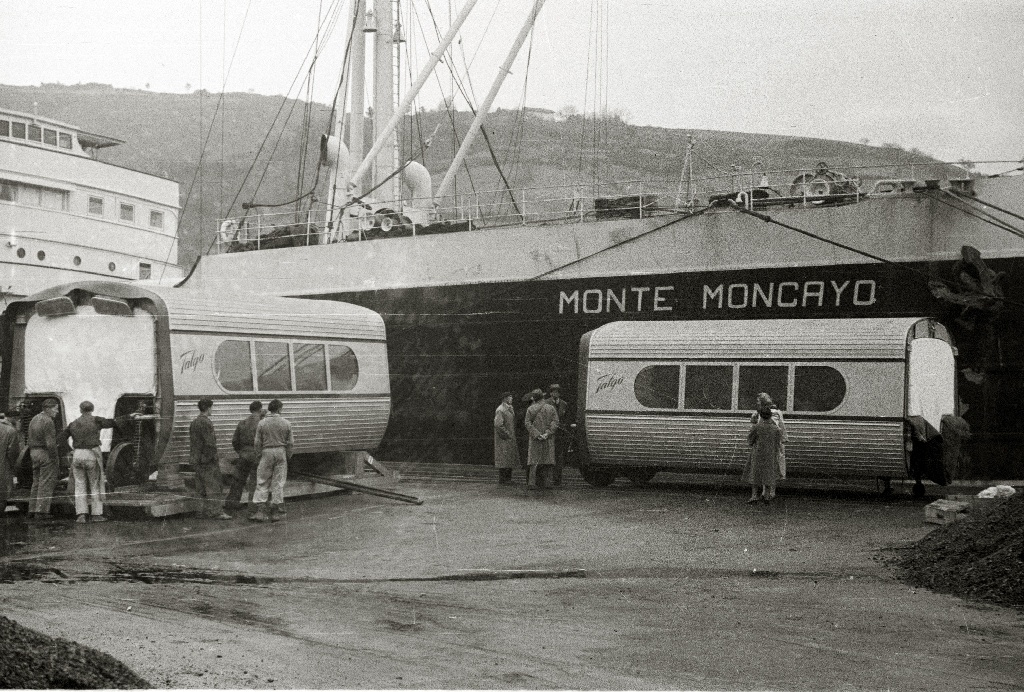
Talgo rolling stock arriving from the US in the port of Pasajes, 1949

There is very little information on Oriol's engagements of the 1940s. It is known that unlike his older brother José María, who assumed major party and administrative posts of early Francoism, he did not engage in politics. Throughout most of the decade he stayed away from public sight and except family events, he was not noted in the press. He did not resume his pre-war Carlist engagements and is not mentioned by historiographic works dealing with Traditionalism of the so-called primer franquismo. According to few available sources he dedicated himself to family business and remained active in “various companies”, controlled by the Oriol oligarchy. It is not clear whether he lived in Madrid or elsewhere. In the mid-1940s he was noted as resident of the Cantabrian Santander; this was probably because of his role in executive board of VALCA, the Santander-based chemical company Sociedad Española de los Productos Fotográficos, founded by the Oriols and 3 other Basque families.

It seems that the key Oriol's business focus was on Tren Articulado Ligero Goicoechea Oriol (TALGO), the new manufacturing and transportation railway company launched by his father jointly with Alejandro Goicoechea in 1942. Since the mid-1940 it was already an exclusive family enterprise, but due to cash shortages and technological problems the company was struggling to launch large scale high-speed train services. As TALGO was unable to address production problems domestically, manufacturing was contracted in the United States. Oriol is known to have spent some time in New York, where he signed a contract with American Car and Foundry and supervised production of locomotives and the rolling stock for the train known as Talgo II.

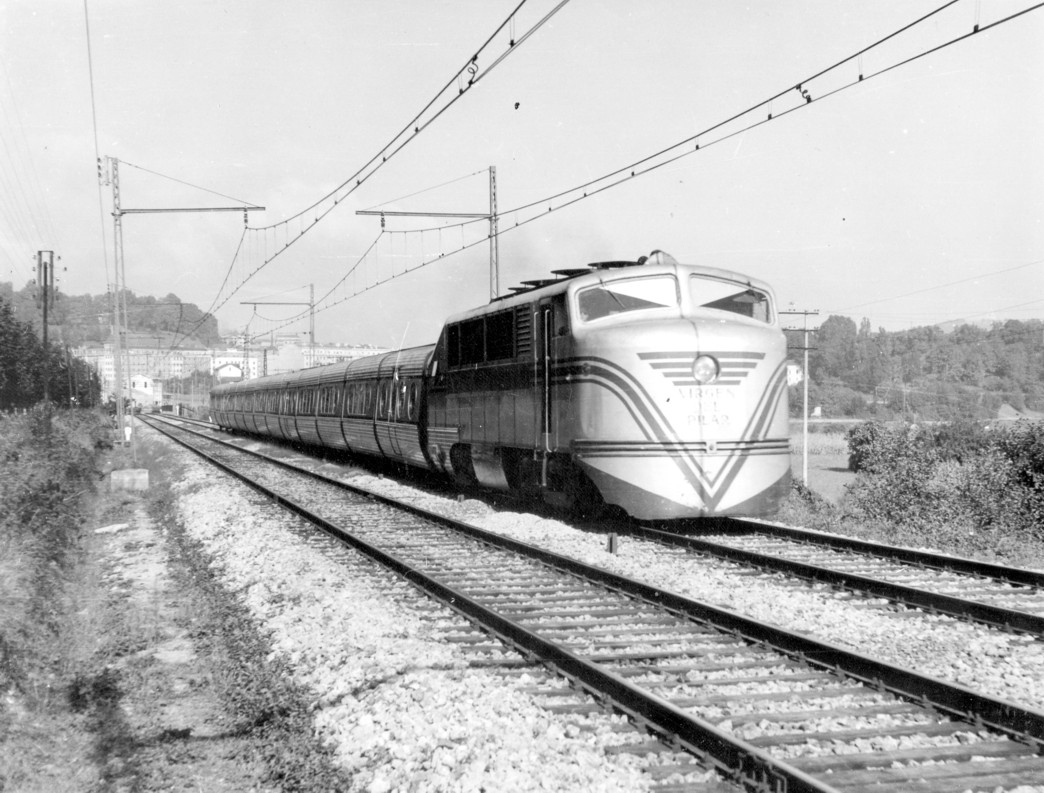
ACF-built Talgo en route

In 1950 Oriol ascended to chief executive officer of TALGO; the company figured prominently in the official propaganda, expected to demonstrate robustness of the industry and modernizing capacity of the regime. Apart from developing production, his other major task was closing negotiations with Renfe over usage of the state railway network; in 1950 the first commercial service was launched between Madrid and Hendaye. The Oriols were not happy with the arrangement and complained about their limited say on timetables and routes. In 1953 the contract was re-negotiated and concluded on the entirely new basis; TALGO was manufacturing and maintaining trains, operated by state railways as RENFE property. The new arrangement allowed the company to repay bank loans and stimulated further development; in the 1950s TALGO trains were already serving at a number of national routes. Oriol stepped down from chairmanship in the mid-1950s, reportedly to assume political jobs. However, he entered the new Comité de Gerencia of the company.

== Welfare and Social Works (1955–1965) ==
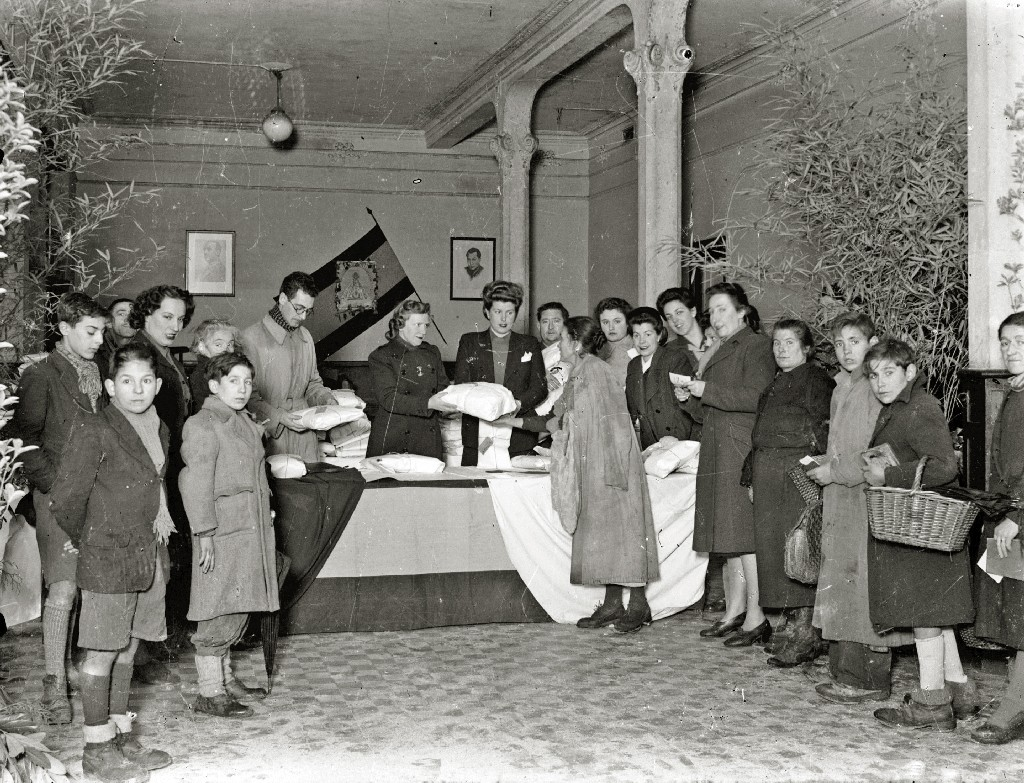
Francoist welfare system at work

In 1955 Oriol was nominated to the FET Consejo Nacional, which ensured his place in the Francoist quasi-parliament, Cortes Españolas. Exact mechanism of his elevation is not clear, though it was part of a wider political change; it came simultaneously with rise of his two brothers, since Lucas took his Cortes ticket as representative of syndicates and José María as personal Franco's appointee. At unspecified time in the mid-1950s Oriol was appointed also FET's Delegado Nacional de Auxilio Social and became president of Cruz Roja Española. In early 1957 he was nominated director general of Beneficiancia y Obras Sociales, the department of welfare located within the Ministry of Interior structures. None of the sources consulted clarifies Oriol's rapid ascent, though there is little doubt that he owed his position in the ministry to acquaintance with Camilo Alonso Vega, who himself had assumed the Interior just one month earlier; during the war years Alonso was Oriol's direct military superior.

Following minor administrative re-adjustments the focus of the department was on re-shaping the social security framework. Until the late 1950s it operated in residual mode, related to various administrative bodies; the system was non-coordinated and calibrated to meet basic requirements. Since 1959 it got formatted as modern state welfare system. In 1960 it was based on newly created Fondo Nacional de Asistencia Social and few other funds; they were included in standard budgetary provisions, while freshly set up Juntas Provinciales de Beneficiencia reported to civil governors. The system was enhanced with further regulations, issued either as ministerial decrees or as official legislation. The regular social security scheme was complete with Ley de Bases de la Seguridad Social, adopted in 1963. It introduced two modes of social security, “protección básica” and “protección complementaria”. As a consequence, the Francoist social security scheme started to resemble these of most Western European countries. A present-day historiographer summarizes the evolution as migration from “Beneficiencia del Estado” to the “Asistencia Social” pattern; another one claims that it moved from a heterogeneous “sistema de Seguros Sociales” to an integrated “sistema de Seguridad Social”. It is not clear how much credit for modernization of the system should be given to Oriol personally.

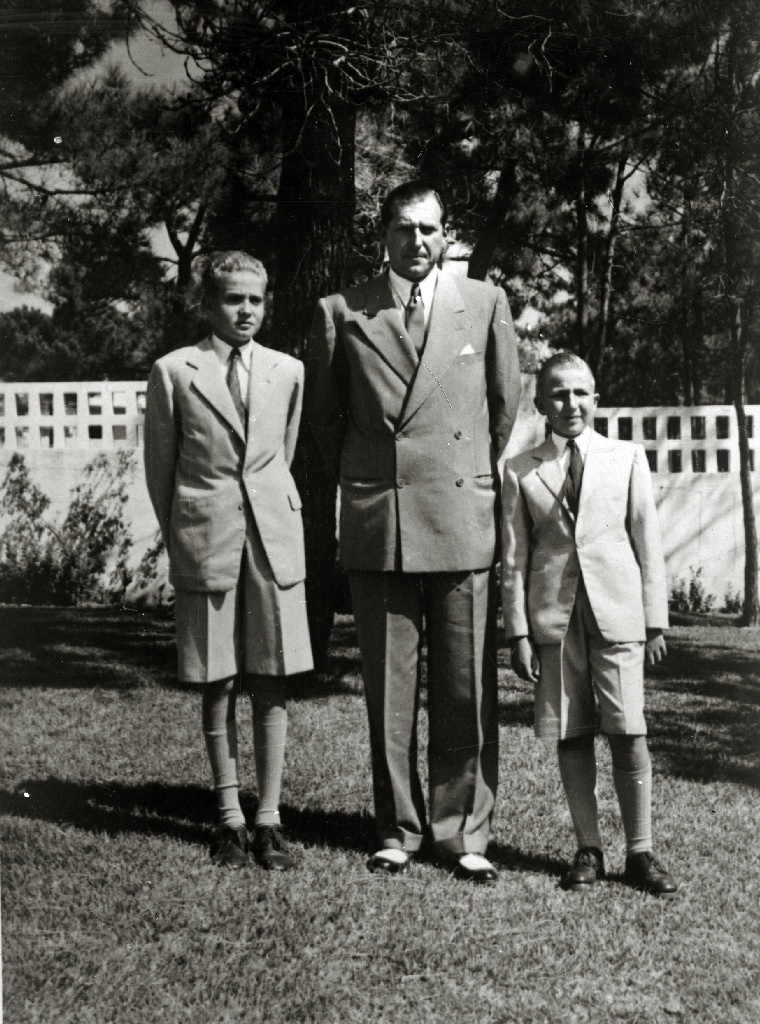
Don Juan with sons, 1950s

In the press of the era Oriol was noted during typical official ceremonies, e.g. opening of hospitals or child care centers, inspecting local welfare administration or commencing various specific campaigns – e.g. the 1963 one against illiteracy – of the Spanish Red Cross. Though he did not take part in big politics, in 1957 together with numerous offshoot Carlists he visited the Alfonsist claimant in his Estoril residence and declared him the legitimate Traditionalist heir; since then he cautiously promoted the Juanista case. He also tried to counter advances of the Javierista Carlists, even though he openly admitted own Carlist credentials. Because of this at times he could have run into problems with more zealous Falangists like Fernando Herrero Tejedor; however, he was careful that ultimately, the Traditionalist identity did not stand in the way of his career.

== Minister of Justice (1965–1973) ==
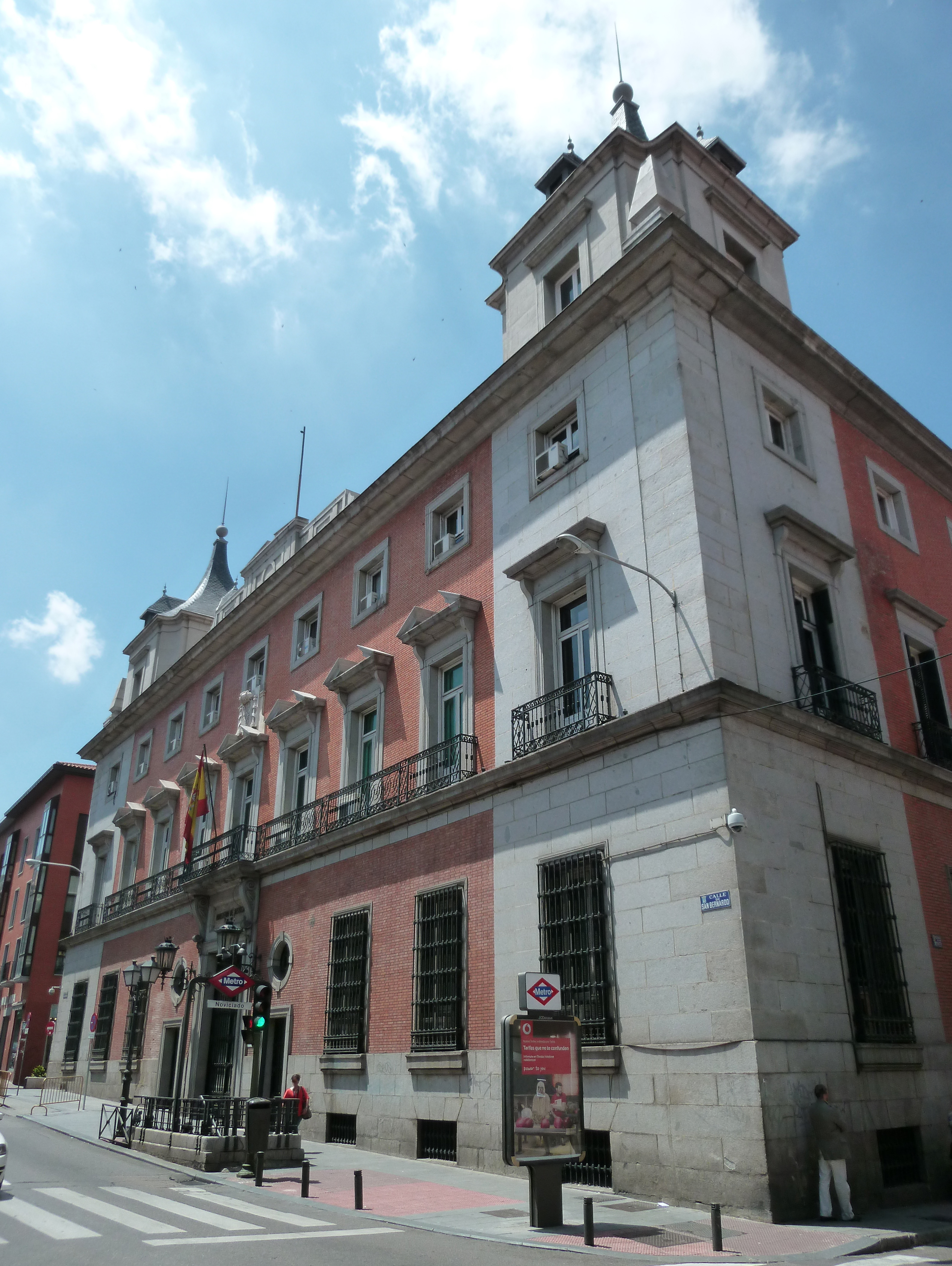
Ministry of Justice, Madrid

In 1965 Oriol was nominated Minister of Justice, since 1938 the office held mostly by Traditionalists. Oriol's appointment was part of Franco's balancing game; in this case, ministers related to ACNDP and Carlism provided counter-weight to these associated with Opus Dei. His first main project was work on the 1966-adopted Ley Orgánica del Estado, major legislation which produced systematization and clarification of existing arrangements with minor reforms introduced; Oriol endorsed it claiming that the regime was in constant evolution.

A key thread of Oriol's work was dealing with Church issues. From the onset busy with religious affairs, he co-ordinated work on the law on religious liberty. The draft generated great tension especially among the Traditionalists; Oriol claimed the project complied with key civil rights but did not dismantle Catholic unity; the law was eventually passed in 1967. Since the late 1960s he was involved in negotiations of a new concordat, a thorny issue related to increasingly anti-Francoist position of the Spanish Church. He opposed changes advocated by the Vatican which would diminish official state prerogatives; following unsuccessful attempt to push through an own project in 1970, he officially hailed the existing regulations; confidential negotiations went on, but bore no fruit. Another religion-related issue was the rising number of priests charged with political offences. In 1968 Oriol set up a prison in Zamora, intended only for the religious. In the 1970s he was increasingly involved in hardly veiled propaganda war with the hierarchy; he admitted some unease about Zamora, but still presented it as a model solution. At the same time he voiced against “Marxist infiltration” among the clergy, demonstrated outrage at public statements of some hierarchs and took some religious appointments as personal insult.

As minister Oriol presided over continuous relaxation of the penal policy. He declared that Spain “had the second lowest prison population in the world” after the Netherlands. The number of inmates kept going down, paired with decreasing number of death penalties carried out; over 10 years there were 13 executions and 19 cases of clemency. However, in the early 1970s Oriol admitted to 3,000 political prisoners; they were all subject to amnesty of 1971. During his tenure he was also responsible for adoption of Ley Orgánica de la Justicia y de los Códigos Procesales Civil y Penal, the legislation which partially reformed and consolidated the civil and penal codes.

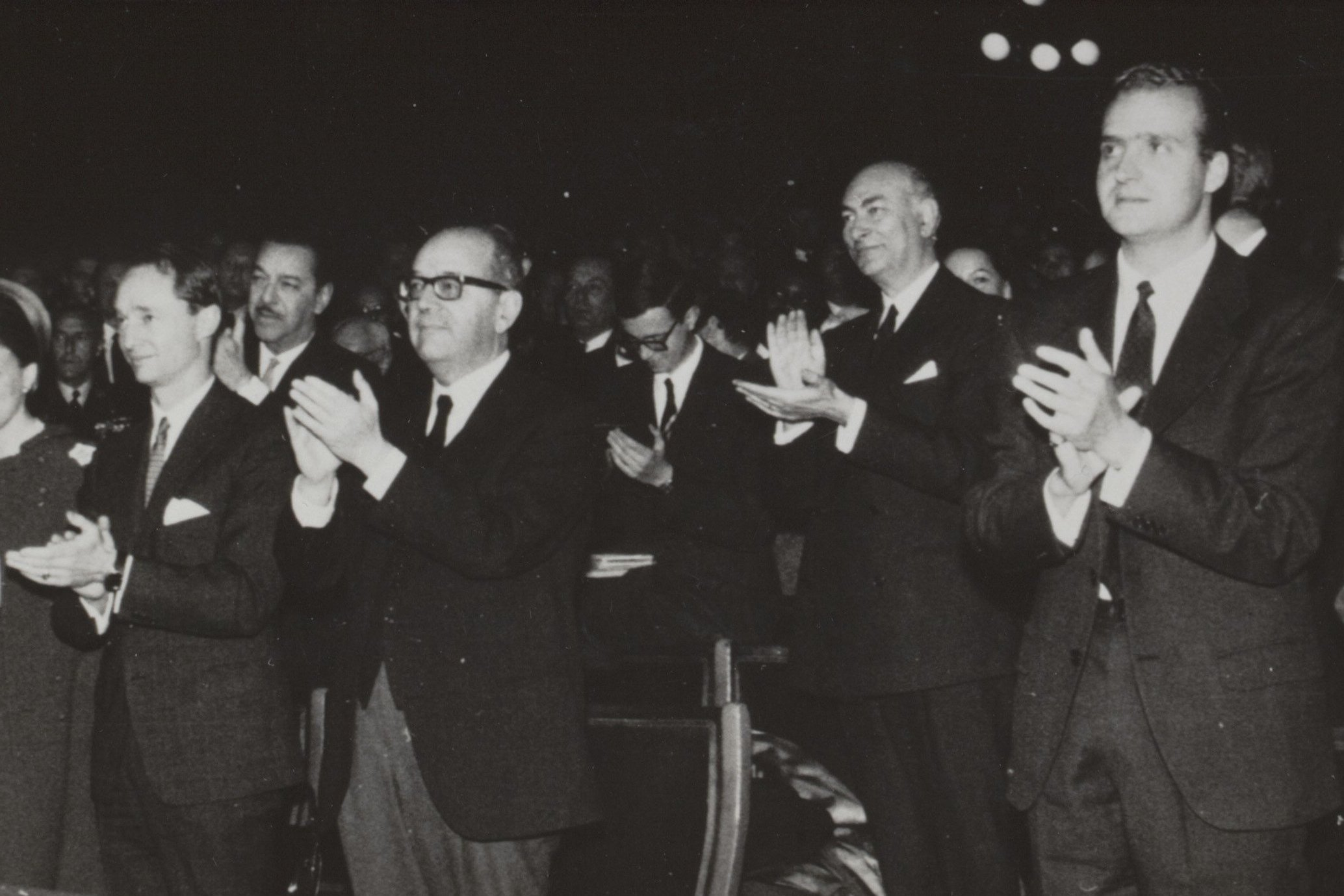
Carlist v. Alfonsist infantes, 1967

When summarizing his tenure some historians consider him “more of a technocrat than a politician”. Indeed, he is not mentioned as major protagonist of power struggle within the Francoist regime of the era; however, he enjoyed personal confidence of Franco and was in position to mount own personal intrigues. He confronted Javierista maneuvers. In his capacity of minister he denied Spanish citizenship to Don Javier and tried to marginalize independent Carlism, claiming that all Traditionalists sided with the regime; he earned virulent hostility of the Carlist youth in return. His monarchist efforts were crowned when in 1969 Don Juan Carlos was officially declared the future king.

== Council of State: twilight of the regime (1973–1975) ==
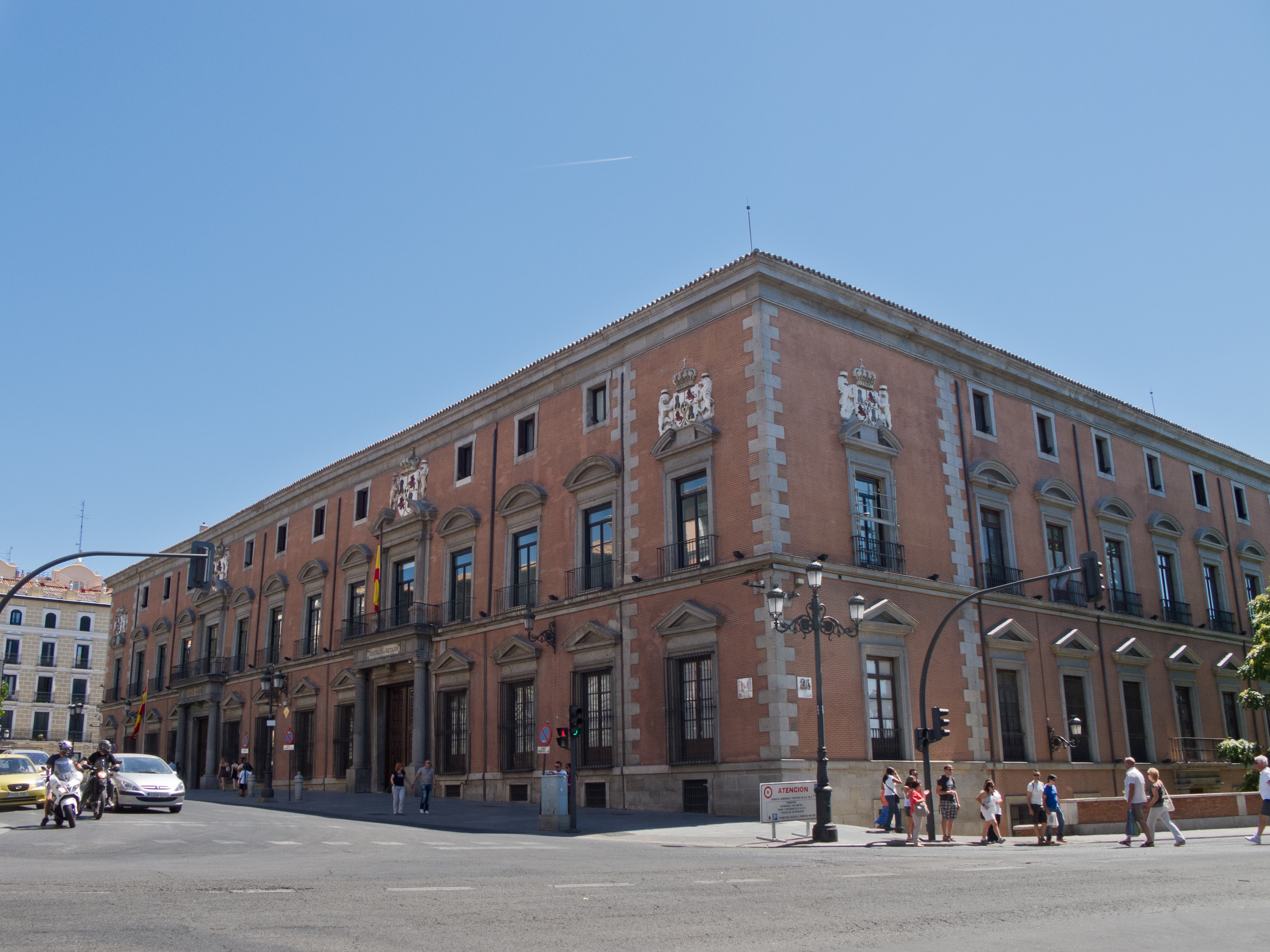
Council of State HQ, Madrid

In July 1973 Oriol left the Ministry of Justice when nominated by Franco to Consejo de Estado, a high consultative body. At the same he assumed its presidency, which in turn ensured seat in Consejo del Reino, another council with some personal prerogatives; he became one of the highest-positioned carlo-francoists. None of the sources consulted clarifies whether the nominations were a step forward or a step back in Oriol's career; he abandoned the office which guaranteed real power to take seats in prestigious, but largely ceremonial and decorative bodies. It is neither clear whether Oriol's move should be associated with death of another Carlist Joaquín Bau, whose passing away in May vacated both seats, or rather was related to Carrero Blanco forming his own, the first non-Franco-led government in June. Oriol retained his seat in the Cortes, doubly eligible by virtue of membership in the Falangist Consejo Nacional and due to presidency in Consejo de Estado.

For Oriol the years of 1973–1975 were a string of visits, lectures, sittings and other events, associated with officialdom related to presidency of Consejo de Estado and membership in Consejo del Reino; they were dutifully reported in the press. They carried little of political substance; when speaking, Oriol declared faith in resilience of the Francoist system and seemed not to have noticed the apparent dramatic decline in Franco's health. Some of his addresses contained veiled references to understanding among all Spaniards and phrases which renounced division into the victors and the vanquished. Many of his statements pointed to Don Juan Carlos as the key person for the future, though some advanced ambiguous comments as to the role of the military.

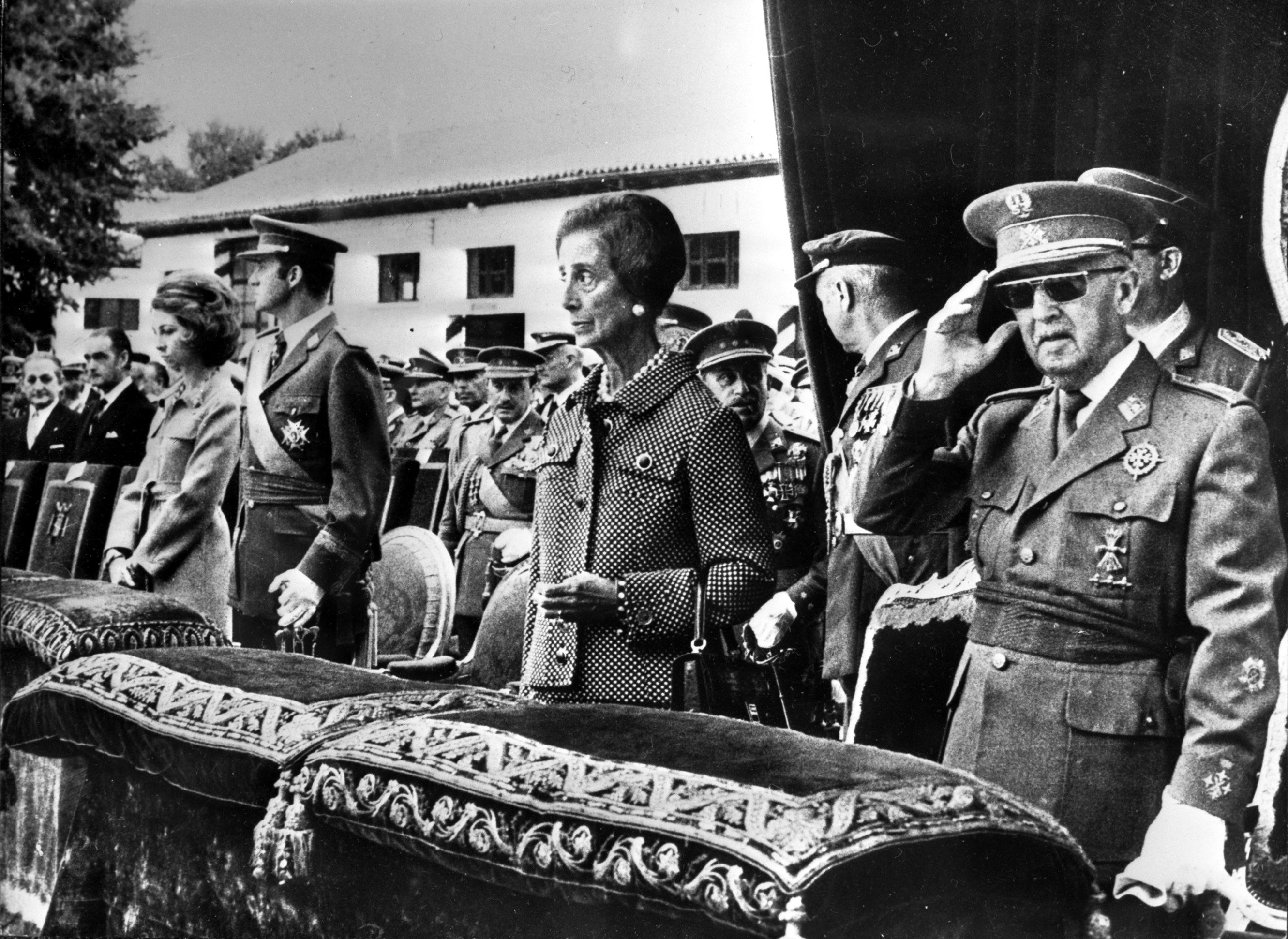
Francoist elite, mid-1970s

During the last years of Francoism Oriol emerged as supporter of “asociaciones políticas”, a long-discussed concept supposed to enable institutionalization of political factions. Himself he tried to build a pro-regime Traditionalist grouping; as early as in 1972 he participated in buildup of Hermandad de Maestrazgo, originally an ex-requeté society designed as pro-Juan-Carlos “primera organización monárquica” and intended to attract a broader spectrum of politicians. He then switched to another project, not based on the ex-combatant platform but assuming a more typical political shape; it was also founded on Traditionalist principles. In 1974 Oriol was seen on traditional Carlist feast, and in early 1975 he tried to organize a “Traditionalist summit”. Following adoption of new legislation on political associations, in mid-1975 the organization eventually materialized as Union Nacional Española with Oriol as one of its leaders. It grouped either Carlists who had amalgamated into Francoism during earlier decades or other regime politicians who hoped that the monarchy of Juan Carlos would ensure continuity of the system, possibly with some minor rectifications.

== Council of State: transición (1975–1979) ==
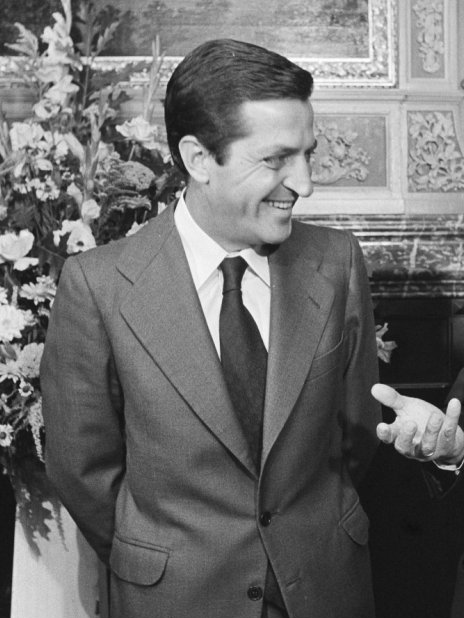
Adolfo Suárez, 1970s

Following the crowning of Don Juan Carlos Oriol assisted the new king in his personal maneuvers, aimed at consolidating power in hands of more liberal politicians. Though in December 1975 he declared the Francoist system well-organized, in April 1976 he admitted that “Francoism could not operate without Franco”; however, he imagined the change as evolution and not a rupture. He voiced against the perspective of a multi-party regime and envisioned the reform as building the system of associations, operating within Movimiento. He was very active in development of UNE structures, in April 1976 emerging as president of its Consejo Asesor. Some viewed Oriol as representative of hardline post-Francoist “búnker”; in reply he confirmed his commitment to evolution and hostility to fundamental changes. He called the Arias government not to deal with individuals seeking system breakup and demonstrated his allegiance to the memory of Franco. In May 1976 Oriol jointly with hardline Traditionalists and possibly in collusion with security services co-engineered an operation aimed at blocking the Hugocarlista rally at Montejurra; it left 2 progressist militants dead.

In June 1976 Oriol cautiously adhered to suggestions of some reformers and contributed to appointment of Adolfo Suarez as the new prime minister. He kept opposing legalization of political parties and insisted on allegiance to the Movimiento principles; he tried to shape the draft electoral law accordingly. However, in November 1976 and unlike his brother José María, Oriol voted in favor of Ley para la Reforma Política, dubbed “suicide of the Francoist Cortes”. As it turned out that his membership in Consejo del Reino was not legally compatible with position in the UNE executive he resigned the latter.

In December 1976 Oriol, as president of Consejo de Estado theoretically the 4th person of the kingdom, was kidnapped by a Marxist terrorist organization GRAPO. His captors declared him an iconic Francoist responsible for repressive legislation and demanded exchange for left-wing political prisoners. The abduction triggered speculation that the government was losing control and the country might slip into the unknown. However, following two months in captivity, on February 11, 1977, Oriol was rescued by Spanish security forces in a raid at a GRAPO hideout in Alcorcon.

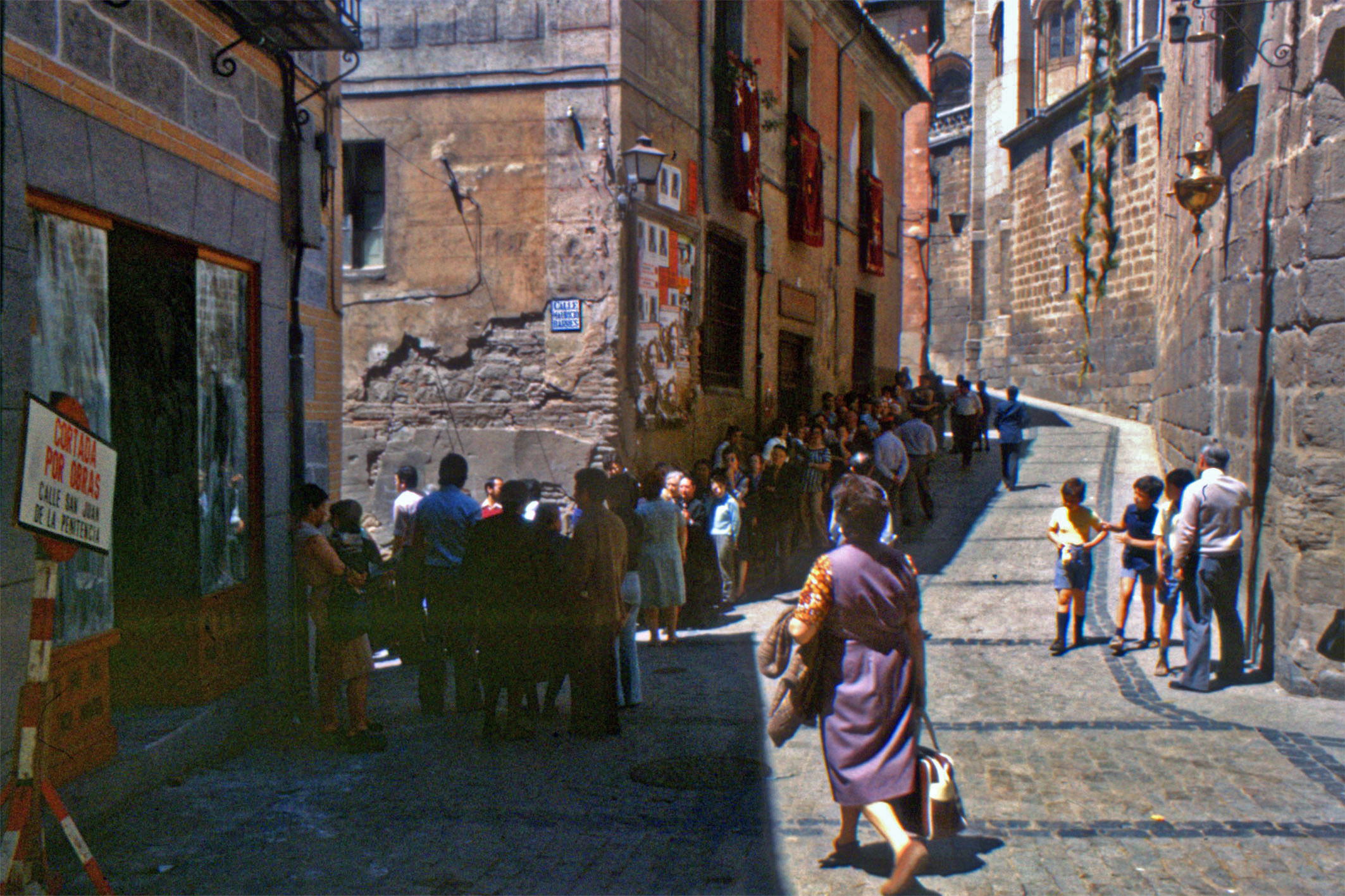
general elections, 1977

As the last Francoist Cortes was dissolved in 1977, Oriol lost his procurador mandate. Possibly involved in leading UNE into Alianza Popular, he did not take part in the June elections to the constituent assembly. At the time he was getting increasingly sidetracked and his activity throughout 1977 and 1978 was mostly about official but politically irrelevant duties of two Councils he used to sit in; also his public statements demonstrated increasing detachment and veiled disappointment. He lost his seat in Council of the Realm when the institution was abolished by the new constitution in 1978; having reached the regular retirement age Oriol ceased as president and member of Consejo de Estado in 1979. Against the rising tide he kept demonstrating reverence to Franco and attended numerous commemorative and homage post-Francoist rallies, as prestigious guest taking part also in religious, local, or other ceremonies.

== Retirement (after 1979) ==
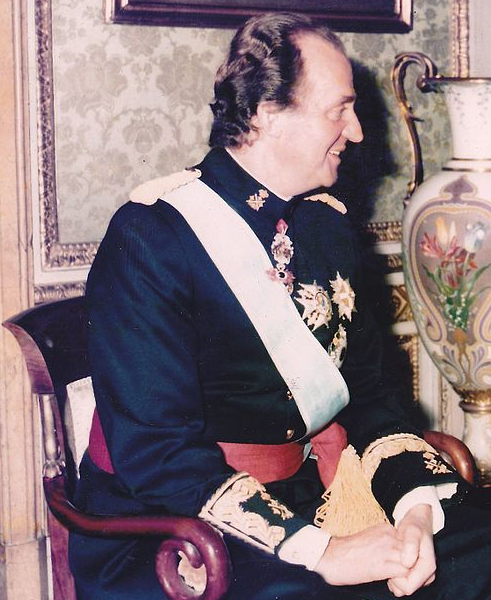
Juan Carlos, 1980s

Having lost all seats in party and state structures in 1979 Oriol became a political retiree. However, he remained engaged in ex-combatant organization and in 1980 acted as president during the congress of Derecha Democrática Española, a short-lived centre-right amalgam. Some historians claim he was active behind the scenes when mounting “operación De Gaulle”, allegedly a plan to topple Suarez and replace him with a military leader; Oriol was reportedly “centro neurálgico de la conspiración”. In aftermath of the failed coup d’état of 1981 some media identified him as political sponsor of Antonio Tejero; Oriol sued them for libel. Others speculated that with Oriol's record of longtime promoter and supporter of Juan Carlos, his taking part in the conspiracy was unlikely.

In the 1980s Oriol appeared in public in relation to various post-Francoist events, never missing during anniversary rallies commemorating Franco's death or attending funerals of other regime officials; he also acted as vicepresidente segundo of Fundación Francisco Franco. As president of Hermandad de Alféreces Provisionales in 1985 he protested against anti-Franco harangues of some state officials, deemed to “break the national harmony”; in a 1986 declaration he professed “la idea de la reconciliación que habría de presidir el futuro de la Patria” and voiced against “revancha que algunos sectores de España pretenden renovar”. In 1987 Oriol seemed supportive of Blas Piñar's idea of building a political right-wing “acción organizada”, but in the late 1980s he was not reported as adhering to the Piñar-led Frente Nacional. Rather seldom he appeared in the media, e.g. when noted for legal action of ex-Francoist ministers who sued for alleged pension irregularities or when interviewed on TV.

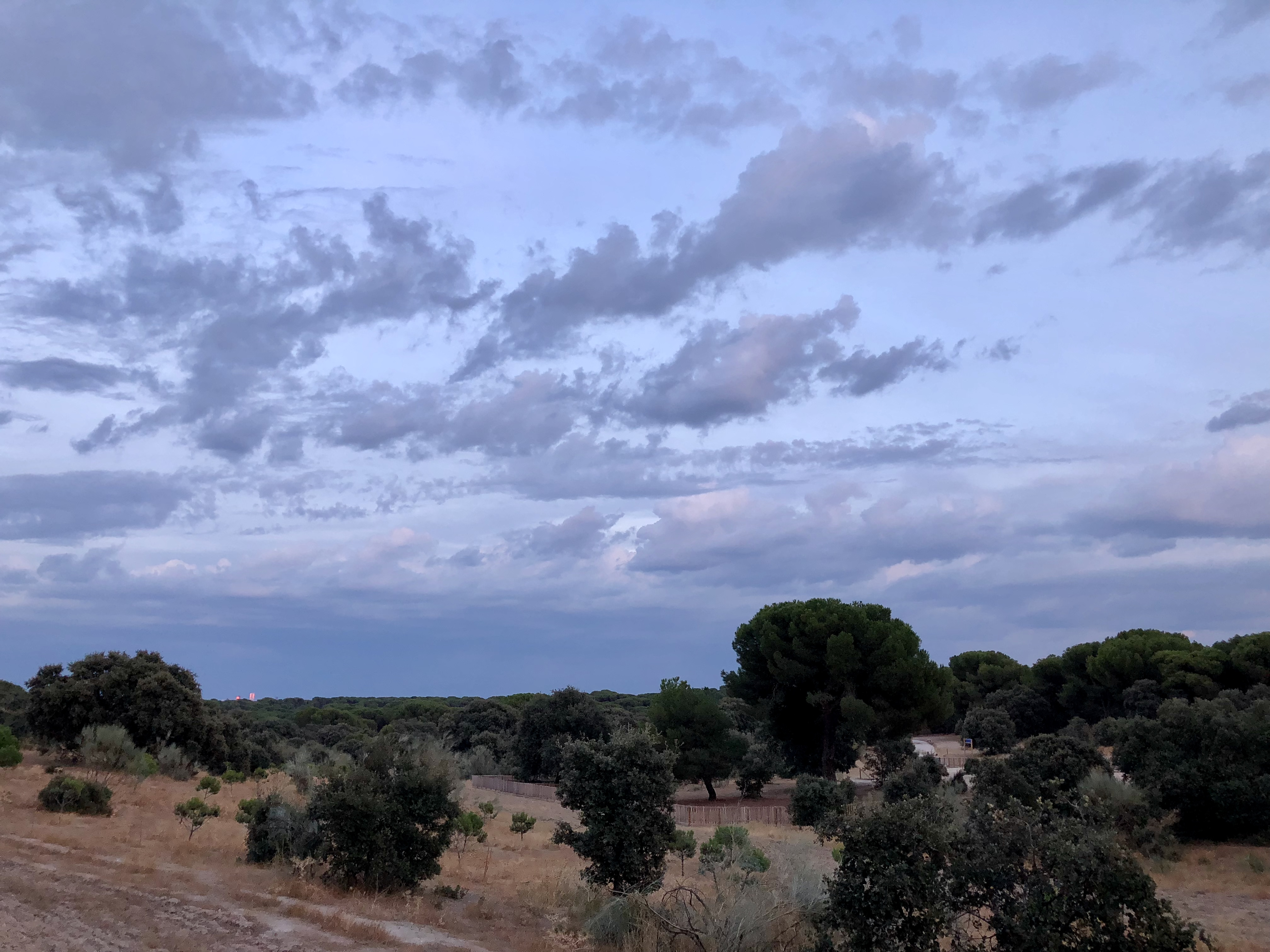
Monte del Pilar, massive Oriol property near Majadahonda

Oriol remained in executive bodies of various companies related to the family business conglomerate; they included Argón, Compañía Minero-Metalúrgica Los Guindos, Electra de Viesgo, Electricista Alcoyana, Fuerzas Eléctricas del Noroeste, Iberdrola, Patentes Talgo, and Vidrieras de Llodio. At some opportunities he appeared in public, e.g. when opening the Madrid-Paris TALGO connection. He started to withdraw from commercial engagements in the late 1980s; he resigned his key post in the board of Iberdrola in 1990, replaced by own son. In the 1990s Oriol was recorded in public only in relation to his presidency of Confederación de Combatientes and Hermandad Nacional de Alféreces Provisionales ex-combatant organizations. Though at that time he was in conflict with Blas Piñar, some of their rallies managed to attract significant crowds. His death was noted in most nationwide press titles; some adhered to respectful tone and e.g. listed his numerous decorations, some repeated speculations about his alleged involvement in the 1981 plot and some merely re-printed standard news agency messages.

== See also ==
- Carlism
- Carlo-francoism
- Traditionalism (Spain)
- Francoism
- Jose Maria de Oriol y Urquijo
- Jose Luis de Oriol y Uriguen
