= Regional Action =

Regional Action Acción Regional
- President: Laureano López Rodó
- Secretary-General: José María Ruiz Gallardón
- Founder: Laureano López Rodó
- Founded: 1976
- Dissolved: 1977^{1}
- Succeeded by: People's Alliance
- Headquarters: Madrid, Spain
- Ideology: Regionalism; Conservatism; Christian humanism
- Political position: Centre-right
- National affiliation: People's Alliance
- Politics of Spain; Political parties; Elections^{1}Integrated into People's Alliance

Regional Action (Spanish: Acción Regional; AR) was a small centre-right political party in Spain during the early period of the democratic transition. Founded in 1976 by former Francoist government minister Laureano López Rodó it was a self-defined Regionalist, conservative and Christian humanist party. Regional Action was one of the seven founding parties of the People's Alliance.

The party held their first general assembly on February 3, 1976, in Madrid, in which López Rodó was elected its President, José María Ruiz Gallardón, father of Madrid mayor Alberto Ruiz-Gallardón, was elected Secretary-General and José María Gamazo Manglano, Fernando Liñán y Zofío, Torcuata Luca de Tena, José María Manglano de la Lastra, Juan Alberto Valls and Julio Rodríguez Martínez Vice Presidents.

== See also ==
- Catalan Regional Action
