= José Luis Oriol Urigüen =

Catalan Spanish politician, businessman and architect

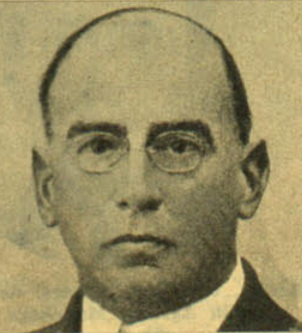
- Born: José Luis Oriol; 4 November 1877; Bilbao
- Died: 15 April 1972 (aged 94); Madrid
- Occupation: architect
- Known for: Politician
- Political party: Comunión Tradicionalista

José Luis de Oriol y Urigüen, 2nd Marquis of Casa Oriol (1877–1972), was a Spanish businessman, architect and politician. As an architect he designed few historicist residential buildings, some of them very prestigious today. As a businessman he was the moving spirit behind Hidroeléctrica Española and Talgo. As a politician he served as Conservative and Traditionalist MP, growing into a local Álava tycoon.

== Family and youth ==
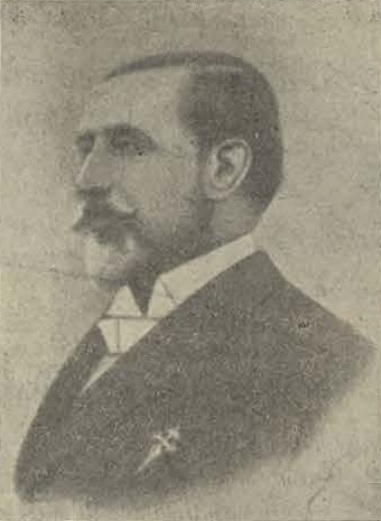
José María Oriol Gordo

José Luis Valentin Oriol was born to a distinguished Catalan landowner family, his first ancestors recorded in the 17th century. The brother of his paternal grandfather, Buenaventura de Oriol y Salvador, was a prominent Carlist; in return for his service to the cause, Carlos VII made him marquis of Oriol in 1870. José's father, José María de Oriol y Gordo (1842-1899), pursued a military engineer career and as a colonel sided with the legitimists during the Third Carlist War. Briefly on exile in France, while the war was still ongoing he married Maria de los Dolores Tiburcia Urigüen Urigüen. A native of Portugalete and daughter of a prominent member of the emerging Biscay bourgeoisie, Lucien Urigüen, she was heir to a commercial fortune and descendant to a Liberal, anti-Carlist family.

The couple settled in Bilbao, where both José Luis and his younger sister María were born. José studied architecture in Madrid, graduating as the first in class in 1903, to continue with his studies later on in Paris. In 1904 he married an alavesa, Catalina de Urquijo Vitórica. Her father, Lucas Urquijo Urrutia, made his name as a highly successful Basque entrepreneur, co-founder of Hidroeléctrica Española, co-owner of Banco Urquijo and a number of other companies; also Catalina's mother owned an immense fortune. From 1905 to 1924 the couple, residing in Madrid, enjoyed birth of 8 children, José María, Lucas, Fernando, Antonio María, Sacramento, Teresa, Catalina and Ignacio. Four of their five sons enlisted later as the Carlist military volunteers, Requeté (the youngest one as a 13-year-old could not enlist). Except Fernando, who died in combat, all of them became well known figures in the Francoist Spain, either as public servants and politicians or businessmen and entrepreneurs. Many of their numerous offspring are currently present in various areas of public life in Spain, be it politics, business or arts.

== Architect ==
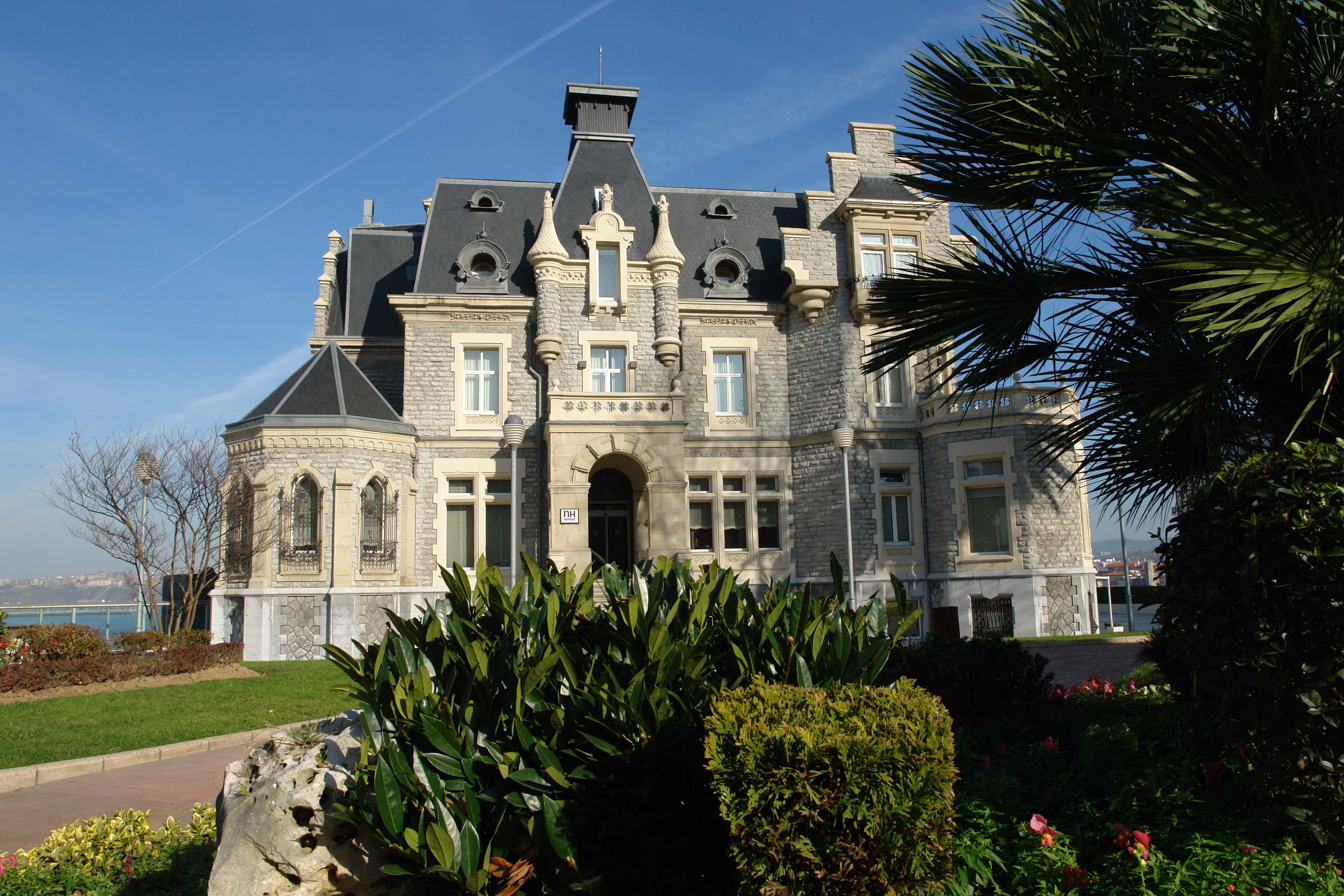
Palacio Oriol in Santurtzi.

José Luis started his architect career mostly by work on family projects, usually large residential estates. The best known designs of this category are grand villas known as Palacio Oriol in Santurtzi (1902), Palacio Arriluce in Neguri (1911) and Palacio San Joséren in Getxo (1916), all overlooking the Bay of Biscay and having been very esteemed locations until today, currently hosting luxurious hotels or prestigious social events. Their style is usually described as various breeds of historicism, with most common references to quasi-medievalism, Romanticism and British Victorian style.

Probably Oriol's most impressive design is a monumental complex of the Medicine Faculty of the University of Valencia (1908), its façade described as eclectic in style and spanning 300 yards. With the construction cost estimated at 4.4m pesetas and esthetical controversies raised, it was nevertheless applauded as a masterpiece of its time, combining technical innovation and high functionality. Especially the large hospital, an elaborate system of pavilions and rooms accommodating 250 beds, with subterranean passages and open galleries, attracted general praise. Enormous scope of the project prolonged the construction work, plagued by a number of misfortunes, like strikes, fires and political instability; the complex was eventually officially opened in 1949.

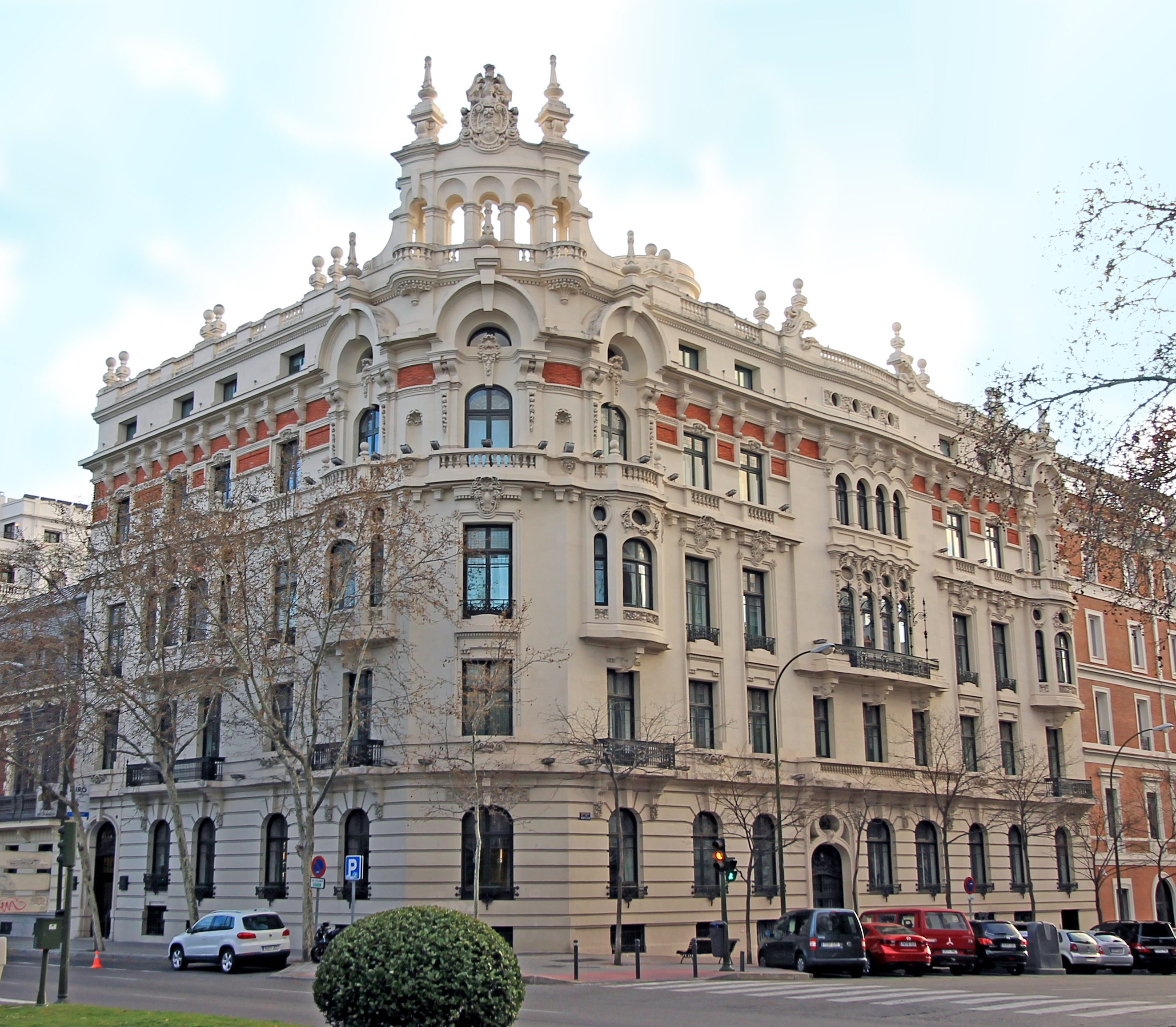
Hotel AC Palacio del Retiro (Madrid).

The best known Oriol's work, however, is casa de Montalbán, known today as Palacio del Retiro (1914). It was designed in the centre of Madrid as a family residence and office; currently it hosts a luxury hotel. The building, its style described as eclectic or neo-baroque, gained recognition and indeed notoriety for its lavish finishing, including stained-glass windows, fountains and frescos; some of its features bordered extravagance, like elevators which carried horses to and from the rooftop exercise ring.

Oriol went also beyond architecture, trying his hand in urban planning. He designed a never executed project intended to channel the Manzanares river in Madrid, though it was dwarfed by polemics raised by another of his schemes. At that time Madrid was changing into the modern metropolis and kept struggling to cope with the rapidly increasing traffic; to this end, in 1919 Oriol presented his plan, named Reforma interna de Madrid, featuring a proposal to rebuild a section of the Gran Via. His design, discussed also in public, was eventually rejected by the municipal authorities. Also his other designs did not escape criticism, charged with verbosity and grandiloquence.

== Businessman ==
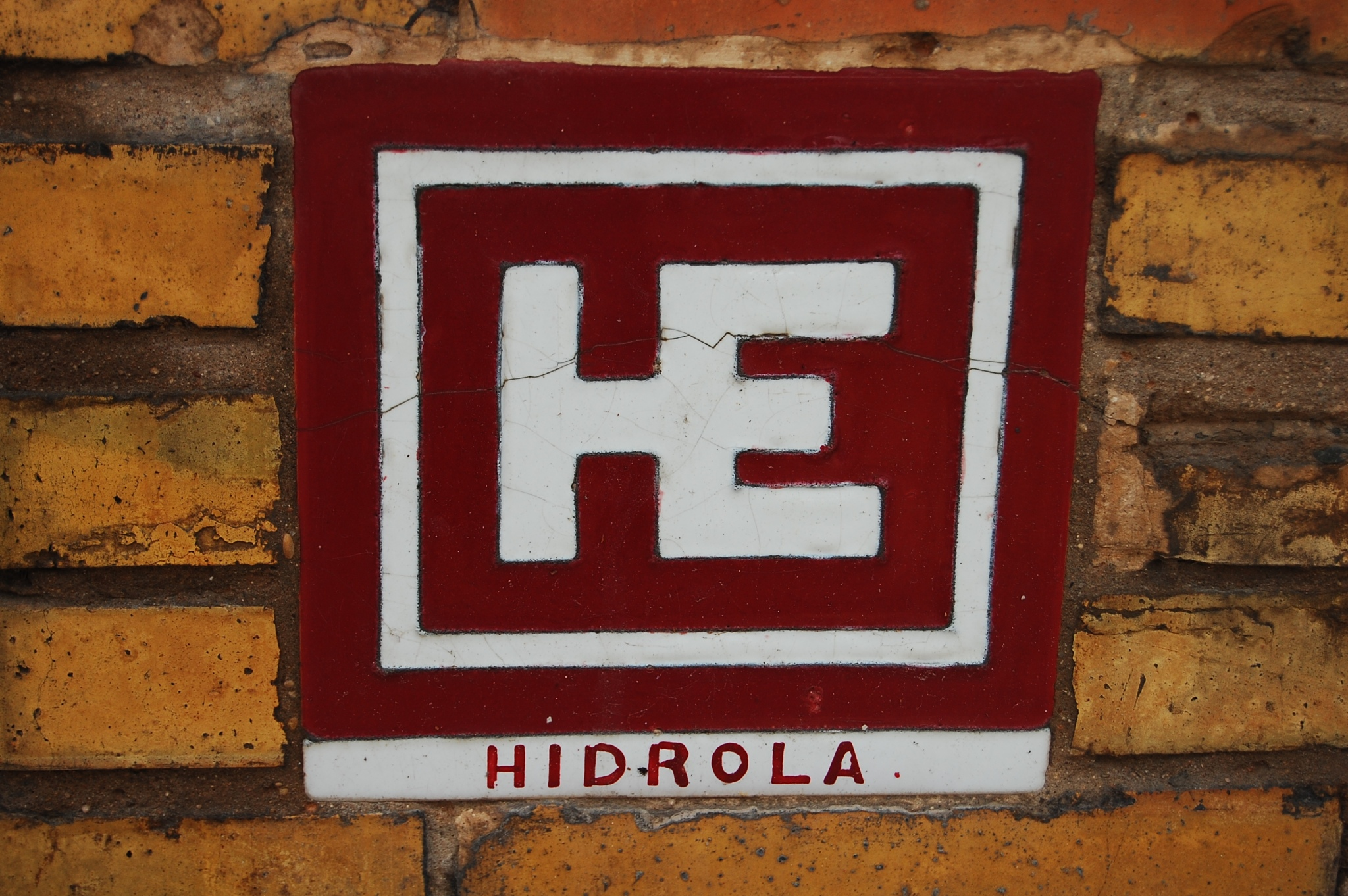
HE logo

Since 1907 Oriol was member of the executive board of Hidroeléctrica Española, the company run by his father-in-law. In 1909 Oriol replaced the ailing Lucas Urquijo at the helm of the enterprise; though his term lasted only a year, he remained in management structures and contributed to the growth of Hidrola. In 1913 he co-founded Electras Marroquíes, responsible for electrification of Northern zone of the Spanish protectorate. When he returned to the top HE post in 1937, Hidrola was already one of the 20 largest Spanish companies (second in the energy sector), controlling 12,5% of the national energy market. Hidroeléctrica owed its success to the sound financial basis, expansive strategy and responsiveness to particular conditions of the oligopolistic energy market structure. Oriol led Hidrola through the years of the Civil War and resigned in 1941, to be replaced by his son José Maria. Throughout his career he has also remained engaged in many HE subsidiaries like Madrileña Electra, Electra Valencia, Cartagena UE or Volta Electric. Apart from the energy sector, Oriol entered the construction business co-founding the Spanish branch of Babcock & Wilcox. He was also sitting in executive boards of a number of other companies and owned a semi-private chemical manufacturing enterprise.

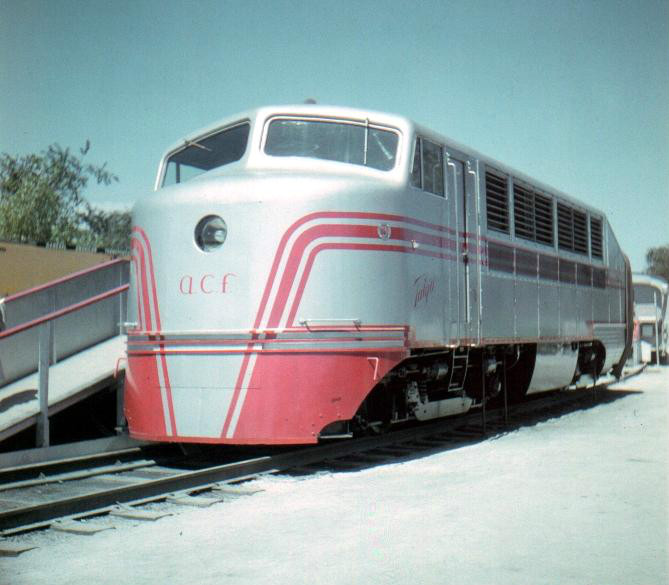
ACF USA-built Talgo locomotive, late 1940s

In 1942 Oriol, taking advantage of his family-related position in the banking industry, provided financial backing to an idea developed by Alejandro Goicoechea, namely construction of a new generation, high-speed train. The result was the foundation of Talgo, Tren Articulado Ligero Goicoechea Oriol, the new manufacturing and transportation company. The enterprise proved to be a commercial and technological success, though initially it had to rely on the US-based production and was desperately short of foreign currency. By the early 1950s TALGO trains were already providing regular high-speed service, up to 135 km/h, at different national railway routes. They also figured prominently in the Francoist propaganda, expected to demonstrate robustness of the Spanish industry and modernizing capacity of the regime. In 2005 the majority stake in TALGO was bought by Lehman Brothers, though the Oriol family retains a minority share until today.

Already in the early 1930s Oriol accumulated or inherited enormous wealth, estimated at 70m pesetas; the bulk of it was formed by various Spanish securities (46m), complemented by urban properties (17m), rural estates (3m) and own industrial assets. He engaged in charity, supporting specifically a medical outlet known as Instituto Rubio. During the Civil War the Basque government decided to expropriate him, but the measure was hardly applied as Biscay soon fell to the Nationalists, and in the early Francoist era Oriol multiplied his wealth in a peculiar environment of highly regulated economy. He is counted amongst the 100 most important Spanish entrepreneurs of the 20th century.

== Politician ==
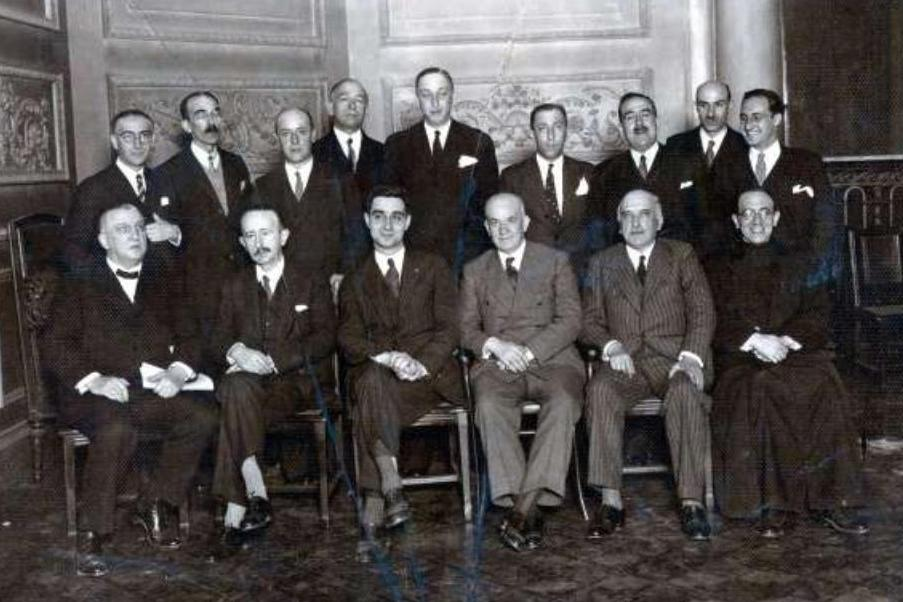
Oriol in Basque-Carlist minority

For 40 years Oriol refrained from engaging into politics, and it is not clear why he changed his mind when decided to run on the maurist ticket to the Cortes in 1918. In the ambience of caciquismo he was elected as a cuckoo candidate from the Andalusian Baeza district (Jaen province). During the Primo de Rivera dictatorship he withdrew from politics, maintaining mere private relations with Antonio Maura. After the fall of monarchy Oriol moved from Madrid to his family property in Urcabustaiz in Álava. While the country was overwhelmed by the Lefitst sway, Oriol proved pivotal in reconstructing the provincial Right. In 1931 he launched and led Hermandad Álavesa, a broad regionalist Catholic conservative grouping; the same year he took over the Heraldo Alavés local daily, re-launched as Pensamiento Alavés and promoting the cause of Christian monarchism and Basque-Spanish loyalty. Within short period he gained a dominant position within the provincial Right and is named paradigmatic for the Rightist Basque caciquismo, Álava sometimes dubbed his personal fiefdom.

In the 1931 election campaign Oriol negotiated joining the PNV; refused a safe place on its electoral lists, he led Hermandad into a Basque-Carlist alliance and was comfortably elected, claiming to defend religious and regional rights. Vocal defending the Church and speaking against secularization, he gained notoriety for assaulting another deputy. Initially he spoke vigorously in favor of a Basque-Navarrese autonomy draft and called Jose Aguirre a "providential figure", supporting also the later Estella Statute and even the third, Madrid-imposed version. It was only after the Navarrese councils had opted out that Oriol changed his mind, fearing that without Navarre Álava would eventually fall prey to Basque nationalism. At this point he advocated that the local Álava councils reject the autonomous statute, which would indeed turn out to be the case, leading Álavese delegations to Madrid and urging exclusion of the province from the autonomy works.

Carlist standard

Though Hermandad Álavesa retained its separate identity, in 1932 Oriol joined the united Carlist organization, Comunión Tradicionalista. He engaged in vast correspondence with the claimant, referring, among other, to his financial support for the Carlist cause. In Junta Nacional Suprema, the body intended to help the ailing party leader, marques de Villores, he represented the entire Vascongadas, in 1933 having been one of 4 members of this body. On the Carlist ticket he was re-elected to the Cortes in 1933. Oriol forged a close relationship with the new party leader, Tomás Domínguez Arévalo, supportive of broad monarchical alliances, maintaining personal ties with many Alfonsinos and engaging in Acción Española, the organization he heavily supported financially. As die-hard Carlists grew increasingly resentful of mixing with debris of the fallen usurper monarchy Rodezno stepped down, suggesting that Oriol replaces him. When Alfonso Carlos nominated the intransigent Manuel Fal Conde instead, the entire Junta resigned and the new one, appointed in 1935, did not include Oriol.

== Conspirator and retiree ==
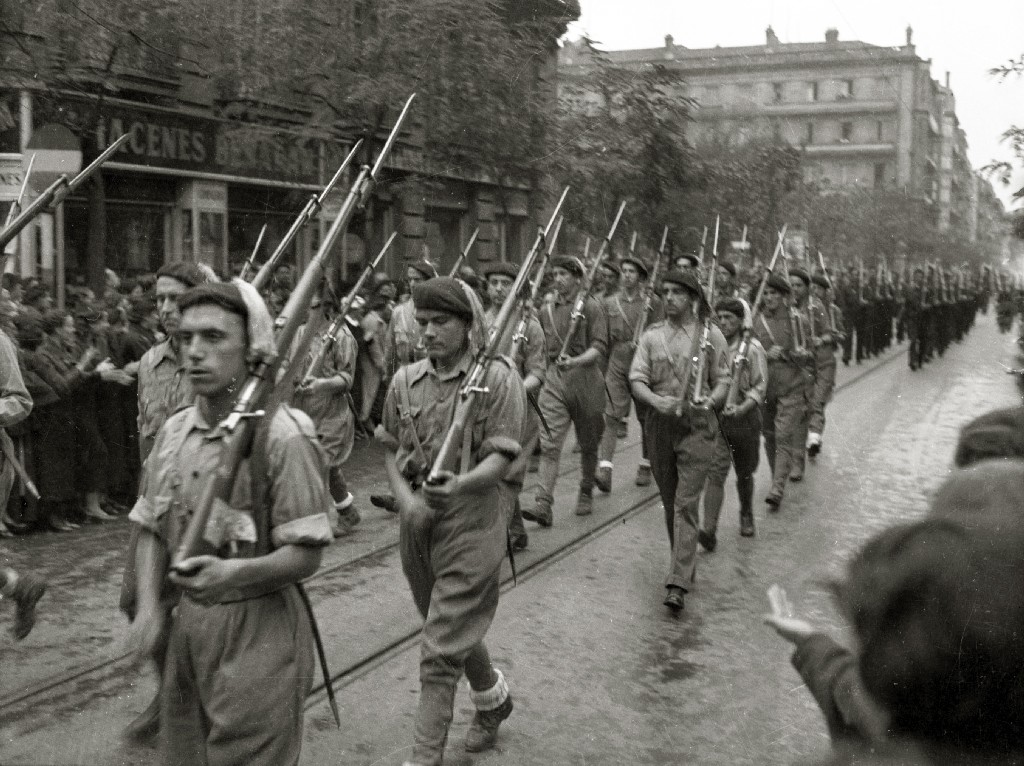
requeté on parade, 1936

During the 1936 elections Oriol emerged as a front-runner, but his mandate was cancelled on technical grounds by the Left-dominated parliament. He became crucial in Carlist preparations to overthrow the Republic. His key role was related to financing and organizing illicit transport of arms for Requeté; he also led local clandestine talks with the Falange. Finally, he was instrumental in negotiations with Mola. Oriol sided with those who unconditionally supported the rebellion and committed Álavese requetes accordingly, the position clearly against the national Carlist leadership, which claimed that the generals should accept the Carlist demands first; controversy between Oriol and Fal ensued. During initial days of the insurrection Oriol was key to mobilizing local Álava support and organizing Requeté units; as a result, most of the province fell to the Nationalists.

Initially Oriol seemed the political master of insurgent Álava, on excellent terms with the local military commander, in control of Junta Carlista de Guerra de Álava and the new diputacion provincial dubbed "oriolista", composed of men forming his entourage. He even allowed himself minor snubs towards the Vitoria bishop, Mateo Mugica. It was thanks to his efforts that unlike Biscay and Gipuzkoa, Álava was spared some remnants of its autonomous regime, including the Concierto economico. The Francoist pressure started to mount in 1937-1938, as positions of civil governor, head of diputación and provincial FET jefe went to Falangist politicians, marking the end of "oriolista" domination. In 1939 some Álavese politicians protested against the regime ignoring Jose Luis Oriol. Early 1940s "oriolismo" was still considered in good health and there were its representatives in Diputaction until 1943, though later within Álavese Traditionalism the oriolistas were outpaced by the Carloctavistas.

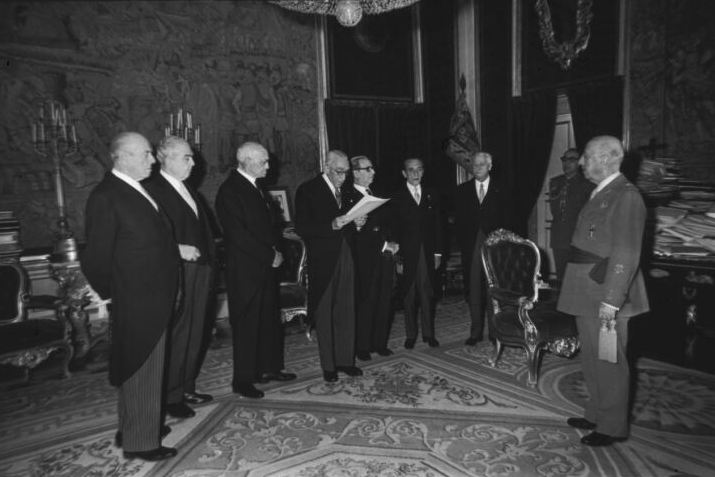
Oriol (3fL) during homage address of Traditionalist ex-deputies to Franco, 1969

In the late 1930s, at the height of his political career, for reasons which remain unclear Oriol started to withdraw from politics, ceding most duties to his son and apparently distancing himself from great schemes by becoming alcalde of Getxo in 1939. Though some sources claim that he entered the Falangist National Council and became the regional FET jefe in Biscay, the recent study insists it was José Maria, who also approached the Alfonsist claimant Don Juan and started working towards rapprochement between him and Franco. Except a single work claiming he recognized Don Juan as a Carlist king in 1956, most scholars do not list Oriol y Uriguen among the Juanistas; one author claims that Oriol was firmly against recognising Don Juan as a Carlist heir. None of the sources consulted offers any information on José Luis Oriol's engagement in post-unification Carlism, suggesting that there was indeed none and that he abandoned politics to dedicate himself to business, charity and family life. In 1958 Franco, as the head of state, confirmed the marques title for Oriol, in 1959 transferred to his son. Living in his El Plantio residence at the outskirts of Madrid, he remained active in business until the mid-1960s. As late as 1969 he paid tribute to Franco visiting him with a group of "old Traditionalists", reported by the press as fully aligned with Francoism and confirming that the last Carlist king was Alfonso Carlos.

== See also ==
- Carlism
- Carlo-francoism
- Talgo
- Hidroelectrica Espanola
- José María de Oriol y Urquijo
- Antonio María de Oriol y Urquijo
