= Laureano López Rodó =

Spanish lawyer, diplomat and politician

Laureano López Rodo
- Portrait of Laureano López Rodo by Ricardo Macarron, 1974, oil on canvas

Minister of Foreign Affairs of Spain
- In office 12 June 1973 – 4 January 1974
- Leader: Francisco Franco
- Preceded by: Gregorio López-Bravo
- Succeeded by: Pedro Cortina Mauri

Personal details
- Born: Laureano López Rodó; 18 November 1920 Barcelona, Spain
- Died: 11 March 2000 (aged 79) Madrid, Spain
- Party: People's Alliance
- Other political affiliations: Opus Dei (National Movement); Regional Action
- Occupation: Jurist, professor, diplomat

Laureano López Rodó (Barcelona, 18 November 1920 – Madrid, 11 March 2000) was a Spanish lawyer, professor, diplomat and politician who served as Commissioner (1962–1965) and Minister for Development Planning (1965–1973) during the rule of Francisco Franco. Later he was Minister of Foreign Affairs (1973–1974).

== Career ==
Laureano López Rodó studied Law at the University of Barcelona and, in 1943, he earned a Phd at the University of Madrid. He held a chair in Administrative Law at the University of Santiago de Compostela between 1945 and 1953. In this last year, he obtained the same chair at the University of Madrid.

He was a member of the Opus Dei.

In 1953 he started to work to the Spanish National Research Council. The team that directed this institution, José María Albareda and José Ibáñez Martín, promoted him into the political life of Franco's State. His knowings in Administrative Law also allow him to proposed important plans that converted him in a key element to Franco and his collaborators, like Luis Carrero Blanco. Between 1956 and 1962 he served as Technic Secretary of Presidence.

Later he served as Commissioner (1962–1965) and Minister for Development Planning (1965–1973). In 1973, in the decline of his political career, he was appointed Minister of Foreign Affairs. Later, in the Spanish transition to democracy, he served in the Cortes between 1976 and 1979.

He died during the night of 11 March 2000 aged 79. He is interred at Cementerio de la Almudena.

Political offices
Preceded by Gregorio López-Bravo	Ministry of Foreign Affairs; 1973–1974	Succeeded by Pedro Cortina Mauri
Party political offices
New political party	President of Regional Action; 1976–1977	
