= People's Alliance (Spain) =

People's Alliance Alianza Popular
- Abbreviation: AP
- Leader: Manuel Fraga
- Founded: 9 October 1976 (federation); 5 May 1977 (party)
- Dissolved: 20 January 1989
- Merger of: Democratic Reform; Spanish People's Union; Spanish Democratic Action; Social Democracy; Regional Action; Social People's Union; Spanish National Union
- Merged into: People's Party
- Headquarters: Calle Silva, 23 - 28004 Madrid
- Youth wing: New Generations of People's Alliance
- Ideology: National conservatism; Post-Francoism; Spanish nationalism
- Political position: Right-wing to far-right
- National affiliation: Democratic Coalition (1978–1982); People's Coalition (1982–1987)
- European Parliament group: European Democrats
- International affiliation: International Democrat Union
- Colors: Yellow and Red

Party flag
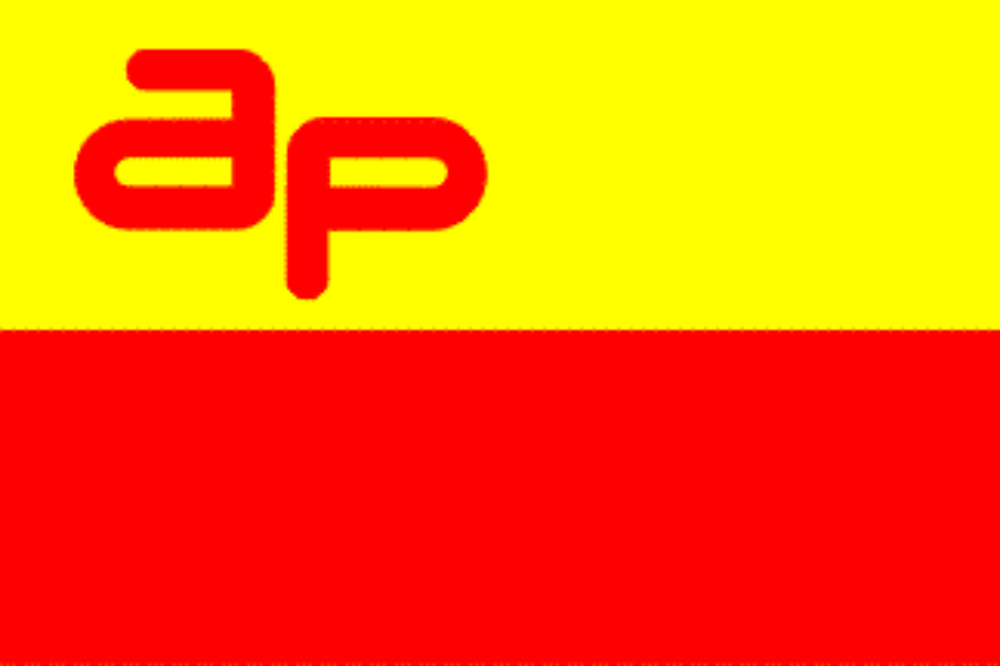

The People's Alliance (Spanish: Alianza Popular, AP) was a post-Francoist electoral coalition, and later a conservative political party in Spain, founded in 1976 as a federation of political associations. Transformed into a party in 1977 and led by Manuel Fraga, it became the main conservative party in Spain. It was refounded as the People's Party in 1989.

== History ==
Logo of AP, 1976-1983

AP was born on 9 October 1976 as a federation of political associations (proto-parties). The seven founders were Manuel Fraga, Laureano López Rodó, Cruz Martínez Esteruelas, Federico Silva Muñoz, Gonzalo Fernández de la Mora, Licinio de la Fuente and Enrique Thomas de Carranza. All seven had been officials in the dictatorship of Francisco Franco; the first six had held cabinet-level posts. They became known as los siete magníficos ("The Magnificent Seven").

Giving up on the project of a "reformist centre", Fraga and his small association Democratic Reform (successor of GODSA) made a turn towards neo-Francoism (the opposite path was followed by Adolfo Suárez) and joined and led what was to become, until 1979, the main neo-Francoist platform. The party position was perceived to be the middle ground between the right wing and the extreme right.

Fraga's own outbursts of temper and the close ties of many of the AP candidates to the previous regime contributed to this perception. In particular, Fraga's often heavy-handed tactics as the first post-Franco interior minister gave voters pause. When elections were held in June 1977, the AP garnered 8.3% of the vote.

In the months following the 1977 elections, dissension erupted within the AP over constitutional issues that arose as the draft document was being formulated. The more reactionary members voted against the draft constitution, and they advocated a shift to the right. Fraga, however, had wanted from the beginning to brand the party as a mainstream conservative party. He wanted to move the AP toward the political center in order to form a larger center-right party. Most of the disenchanted reactionaries left the AP for the far right, and Fraga and the remaining AP members joined other more moderately conservative and Christian Democratic politicians to form the Democratic Coalition (CD).

It was hoped that this new coalition would capture the support of those who had voted for the Union of the Democratic Centre (UCD) in 1977, but who had become disenchanted with the Suárez government. When elections were held in March 1979, however, the CD received only 6.1 percent of the vote. Deeply disappointed, Fraga resigned as head of AP.

By the time of the AP's Third Party Congress in December 1979, party leaders were reassessing their involvement with the CD. Many felt that the creation of the coalition had merely confused the voters, and they sought to emphasize the AP's independent identity. Fraga resumed control of the party, and the political resolutions adopted by the party congress reaffirmed the conservative orientation of the AP.

=== 1980s ===
In the early 1980s, Fraga succeeded in rallying the various components of the right around his leadership. He was aided in his efforts to revive the AP by the increasing disintegration of the UCD. In the general elections held in October 1982, the AP gained votes both from previous UCD supporters and from the far right, and it became the major opposition party, securing 25.4 percent of the popular vote.

Whereas the AP's parliamentary representation had dropped to 9 seats in 1979, the party allied itself with the small right-wing People's Democratic Party (PDP) to form a new coalition, called People's Coalition (CP) which won 106 seats in 1982. The increased strength of the AP was further evidenced in the municipal and regional elections held in May 1983, when the party drew 26 percent of the vote. A significant portion of the electorate appeared to support the AP's emphasis on law and order as well as its pro-business policies.

Subsequent political developments belied the party's aspirations to continue increasing its base of support. Prior to the June 1986 elections, the AP once again joined forces with the PDP, and along with the Liberal Party (PL), formed the CP, in another attempt to expand its constituency to include the center of the political spectrum. The coalition called for stronger measures against ETA's violence, for more privatization, and for a reduction in spending and in taxes. The CP failed to increase its share of the vote in the 1986 elections, however, and it soon began to disintegrate.

When regional elections in late 1986 resulted in further losses for the coalition, Fraga resigned as AP president, although he retained his parliamentary seat. At the party congress in February 1987, Hernández Mancha was chosen to head the AP, declaring that under his leadership the AP would become a "modern right-wing European party". Hernandez lacked political experience at the national level, and the party continued to decline. When support for the AP plummeted in the municipal and regional elections held in June 1987, speculation abounded that it would be overtaken as the major opposition party by Suarez's Democratic and Social Centre (CDS).

==== New political party ====
The AP eventually was refounded as the People's Party in 1989, when it merged with several small Christian democratic and liberal parties in a movement called Reformist Centre under Fraga's chairmanship. It was the ruling party from 1996 through 2004 under José María Aznar and from 2011 to 2018 under Mariano Rajoy.

== Electoral performance ==
=== Cortes Generales ===
Cortes Generales
Election	Leading candidate	Congress			Senate			Gov.
Election	Leading candidate	Votes	%	Seats	Votes	%	Seats	Gov.
1977	Manuel Fraga	1,526,671	8.3 (#4)	16 / 350	4,749,232	9.2 (#4)	2 / 207	(Note: Confidence and supply.)
1979	Manuel Fraga	Within CD		6 / 350	Within CD		3 / 208	(Note: Confidence and supply (1979–1980).)
1979	Manuel Fraga	Within CD		6 / 350	Within CD		3 / 208	No (Note: 1980–1982.)
1982	Manuel Fraga	Within AP–PDP		83 / 350	Within AP–PDP		41 / 208	No
1986	Manuel Fraga	Within AP–PDP–PL		69 / 350	Within AP–PDP–PL		43 / 208	No

#FFA519

=== European Parliament ===
European Parliament
Election	Leading candidate	Votes	%	Seats	EP Group
1987	Manuel Fraga	4,747,283	24.6 (#2)	17 / 60	ED

=== Results timeline ===
Party	Year	(Spain) ES	(European Union) EU	(Andalusia) AN	(Aragon) AR	(Asturias) AS	(Canary Islands) CN	(Cantabria) CB	(Castilla–La Mancha) CM	(Castile and León) CL	(Catalonia) CT	(Ceuta) CE	(Extremadura) EX	(Galicia (Spain)) GL	(Balearic Islands) IB	RI	(Community of Madrid) MD	(Melilla) ML	(Region of Murcia) MC	(Navarre) NC	(Basque Country (autonomous community)) PV	(Valencian Community) CV
AP	1977	8.3	N/A	N/A	N/A	N/A	N/A	N/A	N/A	N/A	N/A	N/A	N/A	N/A	N/A	N/A	N/A	N/A	N/A	N/A	N/A	N/A
AP	1978	8.3	N/A	N/A	N/A	N/A	N/A	N/A	N/A	N/A	N/A	N/A	N/A	N/A	N/A	N/A	N/A	N/A	N/A	N/A	N/A	N/A
AP	1979	6.1	N/A	N/A	N/A	N/A	N/A	N/A	N/A	N/A	N/A	N/A	N/A	N/A	N/A	N/A	N/A	N/A	N/A	N/A	N/A	N/A
AP	1980	6.1	N/A	N/A	N/A	N/A	N/A	N/A	N/A	N/A	N/A	N/A	N/A	N/A	N/A	N/A	N/A	N/A	N/A	N/A	4.8	N/A
AP	1981	6.1	N/A	N/A	N/A	N/A	N/A	N/A	N/A	N/A	N/A	N/A	N/A	30.5	N/A	N/A	N/A	N/A	N/A	N/A	4.8	N/A
AP	1982	26.4	N/A	17.1	N/A	N/A	N/A	N/A	N/A	N/A	N/A	N/A	N/A		N/A	N/A	N/A	N/A	N/A	N/A	4.8	N/A
AP	1983	26.4	N/A	17.1	22.6	30.2	29.5	44.0	40.9	39.7	N/A	N/A	30.1		35.6	40.0	34.1	N/A	35.4	**14.1**	4.8	31.9
AP	1984	26.4	N/A	17.1	22.6	30.2	29.5		40.9	39.7	7.7	N/A	30.1			40.0	34.1	N/A	35.4	**14.1**	9.3	31.9
AP	1985	26.4	N/A	17.1	22.6	30.2	29.5		40.9	39.7	7.7	N/A	30.1	40.9		40.0	34.1	N/A	35.4	**14.1**	9.3	31.9
AP	1986	26.0	N/A	22.2	22.6	30.2	29.5		40.9	39.7	7.7	N/A	30.1			40.0	34.1	N/A	35.4	**14.1**	4.8	31.9
AP	1987	26.0	24.6	22.2	16.7	25.2	11.2	41.7	35.9	34.4	7.7	N/A	25.4		36.7	34.8	31.4	N/A	31.5	10.5	4.8	23.7
AP	1988	26.0	24.6	22.2	16.7	25.2			35.9		5.3	N/A	25.4				31.4	N/A	31.5	10.5	4.8	23.7
PP	1989	For continuation after 1989, see PP's timeline																				
Party	Year	(Spain) ES	(European Union) EU	(Andalusia) AN	(Aragon) AR	(Asturias) AS	(Canary Islands) CN	(Cantabria) CB	(Castilla–La Mancha) CM	(Castile and León) CL	(Catalonia) CT	(Ceuta) CE	(Extremadura) EX	(Galicia (Spain)) GL	(Balearic Islands) IB	RI	(Community of Madrid) MD	(Melilla) ML	(Region of Murcia) MC	(Navarre) NC	(Basque Country (autonomous community)) PV	(Valencian Community) CV
**Bold** indicates best result to date. Present in legislature (in opposition); Junior coalition partner Senior coalition partner

== Bibliography ==
- Gallego Margaleff, Ferran (2014). "Cuando ayer era hoy. Crisis del régimen, movilización y negociación política en los inicios de la Transición" (PDF). In Carlos Navajas Zubeldía, Diego Iturriaga Barco (Coords.) (ed.). España en democracia: Actas del IV Congreso de Historia de Nuestro Tiempo. pp. 9–25. ISBN 978-84-617-1203-8.
- Gil Pecharromán, Julio (2017). "Esperando a La Parca. El franquismo en la expectativa del postfranquismo (1969-1975)". Aportes. 32 (93): 183–202. ISSN 0213-5868.
- Montero, José Ramón (1987). "Los fracasos políticos y electorales de la derecha española: Alianza Popular 1976-1986" (PDF). Reis: Revista española de investigaciones sociológicas (39). Madrid: Centro de Investigaciones Sociológicas: 7–44. doi:10.2307/40183292. ISSN 0210-5233. JSTOR 40183292.
- Río Morillas, Miguel Ángel del (2016). "El nacimiento de Alianza Popular como confluencia de proyectos de supervivencia franquista (1974-1976)". Segle XX. Revista catalana d'història. 9 (9). Barcelona: Universitat de Barcelona: 107–134. doi:10.1344/segleXX2016.9.5. ISSN 1889-1152.
