= Siege of Viana =

- Part of the Navarrese civil conflict
Location	Viana, Kingdom of Navarre
Result	Beaumont victory

Belligerents
Beaumont rebels	Kingdom of Navarre

Commanders and leaders
Louis II of Lerín; Supported by Ferdinand II of Aragon	† Cesare Borgia

Strength
Garrison of Viana	200 light lancers 130 men-at-arms 5,000 infantry Several culverins

The Siege of Viana was a military engagement in which a Navarrese army besieged the town of Viana, held by Beaumont rebels. The Navarrese army took the town, but was unable to capture the castle of Viana. The siege was indecisive; the Navarrese army withdrew to the town of Viana, but the royal forces of Navarre defeated the Beaumont rebels elsewhere. The siege is notable for the death of condottiere Cesare Borgia, who commanded part of the Navarrese army.

== Background ==
By the end of the 15th century, the Kingdom of Navarre was wracked by internal conflicts and the encroaching power of the kingdoms of Aragon, Castile, and France. The Navarrese Civil War (1451–1455) left the country fragmented and weakened the monarchy of Navarre. In addition to the weakened government, two armed political parties formed during the civil war, the Agramonts and the Beaumonts, did not disband after the end of the conflict and continued to compete for influence. Attempts to secure a peace between the Agramonts and Beaumonts at Aoiz in 1479 succeeded only briefly, and the Beaumonts became staunch opponents of the Navarrese crown. Seeking support, the leader of the Beaumonts, Louis de Beaumont II, Count of Lerín, offered to aid Ferdinand II of Aragon in his struggles against the Castilian nobility; in return, Ferdinand supported Louis in his efforts to undermine the Crown of Navarre, which Ferdinand hoped to seize.

The ascension of co-monarchs John III and Catherine I to the Navarrese throne in 1493 led to an escalation of the conflict within the kingdom; Beaumont supporters disrupted the coronation of John and Catherine in the royal capital of Pamplona, and in response the co-monarchs exiled Louis from Navarre. Louis retreated into Castile and ceded his lands to Ferdinand in exchange for lands in newly−conquered Granada, but the crisis allowed Castilian and Aragonese troops to occupy parts of Navarre.

The death of Ferdinand’s co-ruler Isabella of Castile in 1504 weakened his rule in Castile, but Ferdinand quickly recovered. In 1505 he wed Germaine of Foix, hoping that a son born of the marriage would have a rival claim to the throne of Navarre. The marriage shattered the fragile peace in Navarre and was seen a provocation by John and Catherine. Emboldened by his benefactor’s maneuvering against Navarre, Louis returned to the kingdom in 1506, gathering supporters and pressuring the monarchy to return lands to him and his followers.

== Siege ==
In 1506, Beaumont troops seized control of the strategic town of Viana, a few days march south from Pamplona. In addition to commanding the road into Castilian La Rioja, the town was politically important, as the heir apparent to Navarre had traditionally been given the title “Prince of Viana”. In response to Louis' seizure of the town, John and Catherine gathered an army of 10,000 men in Pamplona to crush the rebellion and restore royal authority in Viana. Among the commanders of the Navarrese army was famed condottiere Cesare Borgia, whom had travelled to Pamplona after escaping several years of imprisonment by Ferdinand. Though the House of Borgia had seen its power dramatically decline from previous years, Cesare remained the brother-in-law of John III, and his military experience was valued. Borgia was named as Captain-General of Navarre and moved to recapture Viana with 200 cavalrymen, 130 men-at-arms, 5,000 infantry, and a handful of light artillery pieces.

The Navarrese army arrived in Viana in the march of 1507. Prior to the army's arrival, Navarrese loyalists retook the town of Viana, confining Louis and the rebels to the town's castle. However, the rebels successfully defended their position against attempts to retake it and a siege of the castle began. Attempts to encircle the fortress succeeded in cutting off Louis' supplies, but bad weather and poor positioning of the Navarrese troops allowed for the Beaumonts to maintain a trickle of supplies into Viana. Ferdinand sent Aragonese troops to relieve the siege, hoping to secure the town as a foothold inside Navarre.

On 12 March, a group of Beaumont soldiers attempted break out of the siege and escape into the countryside. Angered at the enemy breakout and frustrated with the slow pace of the siege, Borgia rode out to intercept the Beaumont force; in an ensuing skirmish, Borgia was killed and his body stripped of valuables. John of Navarre travelled to Viana for Borgia's funeral, but further attempts to besiege the rebels failed, and the Navarrese army eventually withdrew to the town of Viana.

== Aftermath ==
Despite the failure of the siege of Viana, the Navarrese co-monarchs succeeded in mustering sufficient forces to defeat the Beaumont rebels. Louis had successfully defended the castle at Viana, but he and his forces were later defeated by the Navarrese crown and his family holding of Lerín was seized. Louis fled into exile in Aragon, where he died in 1508. Ferdinand was undeterred by the Beaumont defeat, however, and continued his plans to conquer Navarre. After consolidating his control over Castile, he launched an outright invasion of Navarre in 1512, which succeeded in forcing John and Catherine into exile in France.
