= Tomás Domínguez Arévalo =

Spanish politician

The Most Excellent The Count of Rodezno
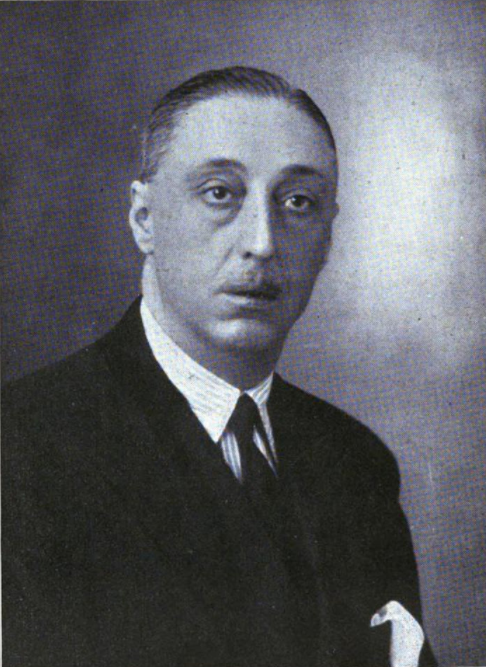
- Born: Tomás Domínguez Arévalo; 1882; Madrid
- Died: 1952 (aged 69–70); Villafranca
- Occupation: landowner
- Known for: politician
- Political party: CT

Tomás Domínguez Arévalo, 6th Count of Rodezno, (Note: sequential artistocratic title quoted after Diputacion Permanente y Consejo de la Grandeza de Espana y Titulos del Reino service, available here. However, there are conflicting views on which count in sequence he was. According to different sources, Tomás' mother was the 5th condesa de Rodezno, or the 6th condesa de Rodezno. Yet another version, incomplete and erroneous, is pursued at Euskalnet service.) 12th Marquis of San Martin (Note: sequential number is unclear. He is considered the 12th marquis by the Fundacion Nacional Francisco Franco, and the 13th marquis by Fz. de Bobadilla.) (1882–1952) was a Spanish Carlist and Francoist politician. He is known mostly as the first Francoist Minister of Justice (1938–1939). He is also recognised for his key role in negotiating Carlist access to the coup of July 1936 and in emergence of carlo-francoism, the branch of Carlism which actively engaged in the Francoist regime.

== Family and youth ==
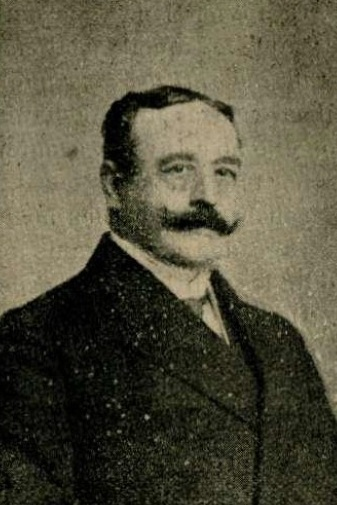
Domínguez's father, Tomás Domínguez Romera

Tomás Domínguez y de Arévalo Romera y Fernández Navarrete was a descendant of two landowner families from the very south and from the very north of Spain. The paternal Domínguez family has been for centuries related to the Andalusian town of Carmona (Seville province). Its first representatives were noted as regidores in the 18th century and intermarried with another distinguished local family, the Romeras. Their descendant was Tomás' father, Tomás Domínguez Romera (1848–1931), (Note: some sources wrongly claim he died in 1920, e.g. Geneall.net, however 1931 is the correct date of his death.) who inherited the local Campo de la Plata estate. He demonstrated political sympathies hardly typical for the region siding with the legitimists during the Third Carlist War and had to leave the country afterwards. Following the amnesty he returned to Spain and at unspecified date (Note: probably between 1878 (the amnesty) and 1882 (birth of Tomás)) he married María de Arévalo y Fernandez de Navarrete (1854–1919), descendant to a Riojan-Navarrese Arévalo family. Her father, Justo Arévalo y Escudero, was a well known conservative politician; in the mid-19th century he served in the Cortes and later as a long-time senator from Navarre (1876–1891). As at the time of the marriage she was already condesa de Rodezno, Tomás Domínguez Romera became conde consorte.

In the late 1880s Tomás Domínguez Romera emerged holding major posts within the Madrid Carlist structures. In 1888 he was president of comisión de propaganda of the Madrid Junta Directiva del Circula Tradicionalista de Madrid the same year elected its secretario general, but when unsuccessfully running for the Cortes in the 1890s, he stood in Haro (Logroño province). He emerged triumphant in 4 successive elections between 1905 and 1914, voted in from the Navarrese district of Aoiz. At that time he was already member of the national Carlist executive; in 1912 he entered Junta Nacional Tradicionalista representing Castilla La Nueva, (Note: some sources claim that he headed Castilla la Nueva y Extremadura.) in 1913 entered comisión de Tesoro de la Tradición and chaired party gatherings interchanging with the likes of Cerralbo, Feliu or de Mella. (Note: like in 1911. Some authors consider him a politician who betrayed Carlism in 1911, allegedly mounting a coalition with the Integrists and the Conservatives.)

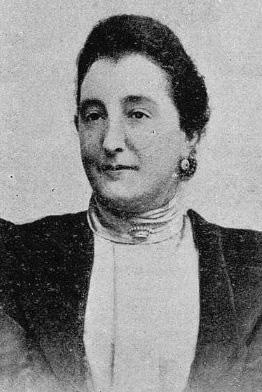
Domínguez's mother, María de Arévalo y Fernandez de Navarrete

It is not clear whether Tomás Domínguez Arévalo spent his early childhood in the capital or in Villafranca. He was then educated in the Jesuit Colegio de San Isidoro in Madrid, at unspecified date commencing law studies at the University of Madrid; he followed classes of the then Carlist political leader, Matías Barrio y Mier. It is during his academic years that Domínguez came to know Jaime Chicharro and Luis Hernando de Larramendi, active in Juventud Jaimista but also in literary and artistic circles. He graduated in 1904; some authors, contemporary press and the official Cortes service refer to him as "abogado", though none of the sources consulted confirms that he practiced as a lawyer. Urbane and gregarious, in 1917 Domínguez married Asunción López-Montenegro y García Pelayo, descendant to a wealthy aristocratic terrateniente family from Cáceres, with its representatives holding prestigious posts in the city and in the province. The couple settled in Villafranca; they had one child, María Domínguez y López-Montenegro. Following the death of his mother in 1919, in 1920 Tomás Domínguez Arévalo inherited the title of conde de Rodezno; (Note: his mother held 2 titles, condesa de Rodezno and condesa de Valdellano. The first one was inherited by Tomás, the second one by his younger brother José María.) following the death of his father in 1931 he became marqués de San Martín. (Note: Domínguez Romera inherited the title from maternal line in 1911.)

== Early political career ==
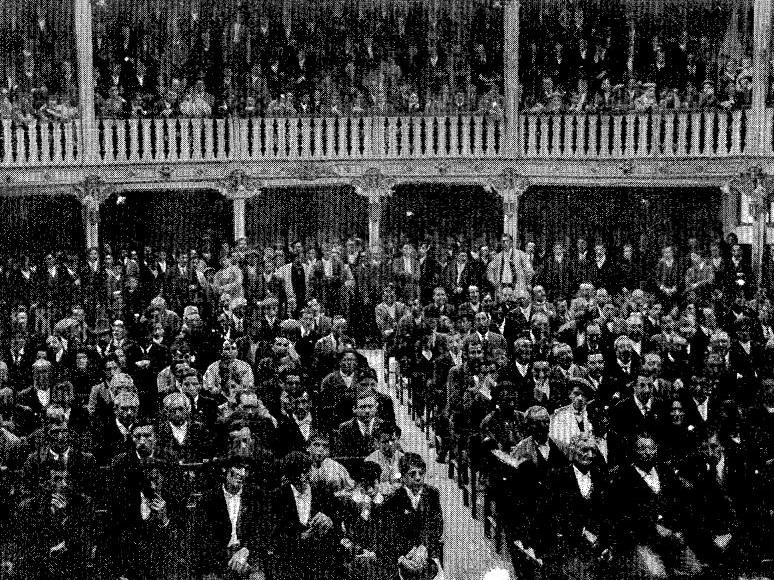
Carlist electoral meeting, ca 1910

There is almost no information on Domínguez's public activity in the first decade of the 20th century; he was probably active in Juventud Jaimista and Juventud Hispanoamericana. (Note: later on, in 1919, he grew to vice-president of the organisation.) In 1909 he published his first work, a booklet dedicated to medieval rulers of Navarre, followed by articles in scholarly reviews focusing on history of the province (Note: in 1912 he published Un Infante de Navarra, yerno del Cid and in 1913 De tiempos lejanos. Glosas históricas, both in Revista de Historia y Genealogía) and short biographical studies, also anchored in history of Navarre. (Note: his 1915 and 1916 articles on genealogy are available online) Domínguez also tried his hand in Pamplona dailies as a literary critic. (Note: see his Arturo Campión. Semblanza literaria, published in Diario de Navarra between 20.1.12 and 18.02.12) Some authors claim that his first public assignment was mayorship of Villafranca, (Note: his 1952 obituary also referred to him as ex-alcalde de Villafranca but specified no period of his term in office, see ABC 19.08.52, available here) but when first running for seat in the Cortes, he was referred to by the press only as "joven abogado y escritor".

Domínguez's entry into politics was facilitated by memory of his late maternal grandfather and especially by standing of his father, one of the most distinguished politicians of Navarre; (Note: periodically serving also as dean of the Navarrese deputies and senators. At that time the strength of Carlism was at its peak in the province, with the movement gaining 70–85% of deputy seats available and controlling the remaining pool by means of electoral alliances. Some authors maintain that Domínguez Romera was jefe of Navarrese Carlism and that his son "inherited" the post; this claim about Domínguez Romero's Navarrese jefatura is not confirmed elsewhere. Until 1916 the Navarrese jefe was Francisco Martinez, and after 1916 it was Romualdo Cesareo Sanz Escartin.) his position is dubbed as "cacicato" and the Aoiz district was considered his personal fiefdom. It is not known why he decided not to renew his mandate in the 1916 campaign. Initially Domínguez Romera was to be substituted as Jaimista candidate by Joaquín Argamasilla, but in unclear circumstances the latter was replaced by Domínguez Arévalo. Argamasilla stroke back with a pamphlet, lambasting alleged alliance with the liberals and charging his substitute with flexibility bordering opportunism. Though resident of another Navarrese district of Tafalla, (Note: Villafranca was part of the Peralta zone, itself forming the Tafalla electoral district.) Domínguez Arévalo was also presented as a cuckoo candidate. (Note: by their opponents both Domínguez Romera and Domínguez Arévalo were presented as "cuneros".) Despite the critique, he was narrowly (Note: both candidates won in two out of 4 comarcas of the district, but Domínguez Arévalo won in more populous ones.) elected; he renewed his ticket, though also marginally, in the 1918 campaign in the same district.

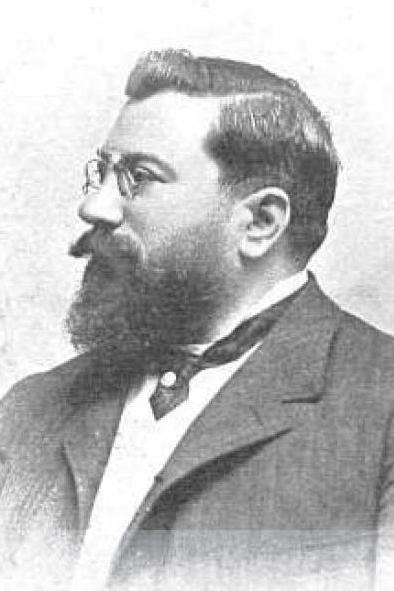
Juan Vázquez de Mella

At that time Carlism was increasingly paralyzed by tension between its top theorist Vazquez de Mella and the claimant Don Jaime; Domínguez was counted among supporters of the former. (Note: some authors claim that Domínguez was from his youth a "fiel seguidor desde su juventud de Juan Vázquez de Mella") According to some historians (Note: the opinion of Melchor Ferrer, approvingly repeated in Andrés Martín (2000).) he considered orthodox Carlism a dead-end street given the Carlist dynasty was already certain to extinguish. (Note: the Carlist king Jaime III was over 50 and still a bachelor; he had no brothers and his uncle was over 70 with no descendants) He shared de Mella's vision of a grand extreme-right coalition, which would be new possibilist reincarnation of Traditionalism; he also considered sort of transfer of legitimist rights to the Alfonsine dynasty. (Note: this stand was lambasted as "dishonor" by the orthodox Jaimistas.) However, at the 1919 moment of breakup he decided to stay loyal to Don Jaime, (Note: another historian claims he followed de Mella.) even given discrepancies between him and his king were already public.

In the 1919 campaign Domínguez Arévalo presented his bid in Aoiz, but lost to a Maurista candidate by the smallest margin possible. In 1920 the same two hopefuls competed in the same district; this time Domínguez, already conde de Rodezno, lost more decisively, (Note: his counter-candidate gained 55.8% of the votes.) the visible sign of increasingly loose Carlist grip on Navarre. A mere week after the defeat he presented his candidature to the Senate. As indirect elections to the upper chamber were more about behind-the-stage party dealings rather than about seeking popular vote, the Jaimistas managed to negotiate Rodezno's success. He was also re-elected for the successive term in 1922. His activity as recorded in the Senate archive was insignificant. One of his few interventions referred to tariffs on cork exports, the issue he was personally interested in as there was cork produced on his Andalusian Carmona estate.

== Dictatorship ==
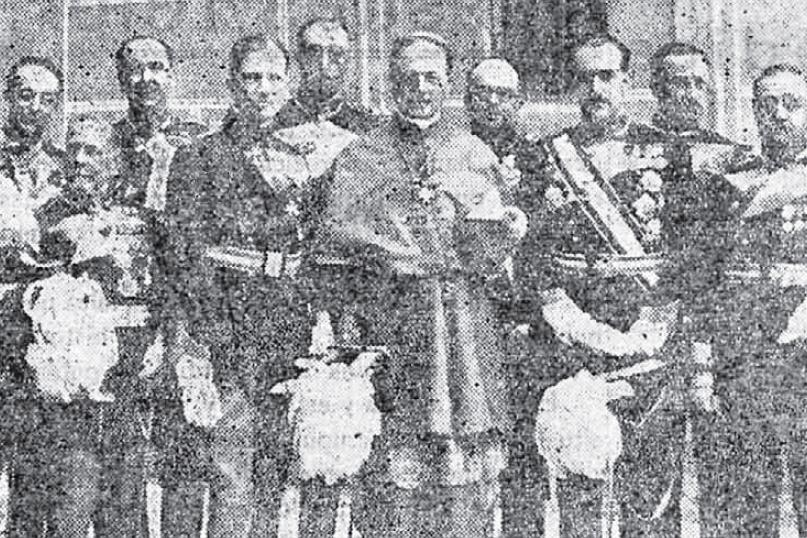
Rodezno with knights of the Sovereign Military Order of Malta

Advent of the Primo de Rivera dictatorship suspended Rodezno's parliamentarian career. Having lost his senate mandate he abandoned politics and is not listed as active in any of the primoderiverista institutions, be it either Somatén, Unión Patriotica or any other organization. (Note: however, he is recorded as not particularly averse towards the dictatorship. Having learnt of his Villafranca mayorship Luis Hernando de Larramendi asked Rodezno: "pero cómo puedes soportar eso?", to which the latter replied "mira chico, el caso es mandar".) However, he did not withdraw from public life. Rodezno took part in various Christian activities, contributed to cultural initiatives, remained engaged in Carlist structures and pursued his career as author and historian, at the same time dedicating his time to family and business.

A member of the Catholic aristocracy, Rodezno was active in the Sovereign Military Order of Malta and remained on good terms with Spanish hierarchy and the papal nuncio. He forged particularly good relationship with Pedro Segura, welcoming the new bishop in Cáceres, 6 years later greeting him as new archbishop of Burgos during the homage celebrations in the same city, (Note: which at that time formed part of the Burgos archdiocese.) and in 1928 taking part in Toledo celebrations following Segura's ascendance to the primate of Spain. On the more practical side, adhering to Segura's knack for social action he co-organized Acción Social Diocesana in Cáceres and gave lectures during various initiatives like Semana Social, organized by Acción Católica.

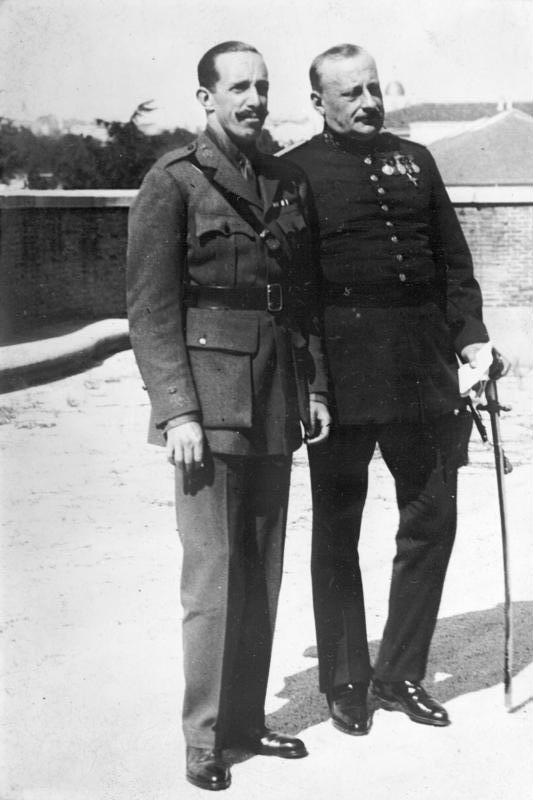
Alfonso de Borbón and Miguel Primo de Rivera

Rodezno's cultural activities were strongly flavored by Carlism. In Pamplona he organized anniversary homage celebrations to veterans of the Third Carlist War, in San Sebastián he took part in works of Sociedad de Estudios Vascos when preparing "La exposición de las Guerras Civiles" of the 19th century, and in Madrid he co-organized fundraising and himself donated large sums to the planned monument of Vázquez de Mella. However, he became most noted for his historical effort. Apart from inedita, in 1928 he published La princesa de Beira y los hijos de D. Carlos (Note: entire book available here) and in 1929 Carlos VII, duque de Madrid, monographs dedicated to already mythical Carlist figures; both books were widely discussed on literary pages of the Spanish press of the day. Though they pursued a personal approach of the author, both remain quoted and referenced also by present-day scholars. (Note: as a historian he blamed the second wife of Carlos VII, Bertha de Rohan, for his alleged ineptitude during late phases of his life, when he "no era el arriscado caudillo de Navarra de 1873.")

Rodezno and his wife held land estates scattered across Spain: in Navarre, inherited from his mother; in Extremadura, brought into the marriage by his wife; and in Andalusia, inherited from his father. Some authors refer to him as "grande terrateniente" "cacique terrateniente", (Note: some even blame him for the 1894 events, when 800 soldiers protected estate of his grandfather during social unrest in Villafranca.) "grandee proprietor" (Note: Blinkhorn (2008) claims also that Rodezno owned a señorio in La Rioja.) or "prominent landowner", an exemplary case of link between landownership and power, (Note: and quote him as exemplary case of a link between landownership and power.) though exact size of his holdings is unclear and probably did not exceed 500 ha combined. (Note: he had 502 robadas in Villafranca, divided into 47 fincas. Given a robada was ca 0,09 ha his estate covered some 45 ha and was far behind largest estates in the area, exceeding even 100 ha. In Carmona he and his wife held 200 ha. The estates did not make an impressive figure by national Spanish standards; as late as in 1919 duque de Peñaranda possessed 51,000 ha. In the sole Cordoba district there were around 30 landholders with estates exceeding 1,000 ha (surface area is listed in fanegas (fgs), a fanega differed from province to province, though one scholar suggests an average of 1 fg was 1,044 ha for the nearby Almeria province.) He was head of Federacion Catolico Agraria de Navarra, co-founder of Asociación de Terratenientes de Navarra and member of Asociacion de Propietarios de Alcornocales. On behalf of some of these pressure groups he held talks with various ministers, (Note: like the minister of economy, meeting with a group of "cerealistas" in 1926, and the minister of infrastructure in 1930.) publishing also analytical studies on agricultural credit and land ownership. (Note: in 1926 he published La propiedad privada en Navarra, y un informe sobre reforma tributaria) In his opinion in terms of rural property the Navarrese structure was close to ideal, almost reaching the objective "que todos los agricultores fueran propietarios"; later in the republic he defended the arrendamiento structure.

== Jefe ==
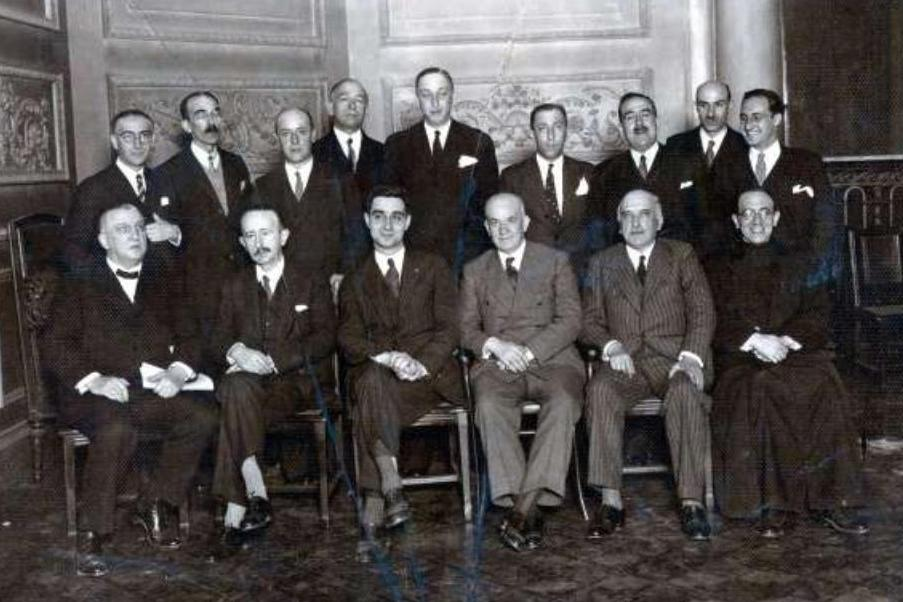
Rodezno in Basque-Carlist minority

Though mostly dormant in times of the dictatorship, during Dictablanda Carlism assumed more active stance. In June 1930 the new Navarrese junta with Rodezno its member was set up, an attempt to enforce more cautious policy towards Basque nationalism and to shift focus from foral to religious issues. The move might have backfired following declaration of the Republic, as the Carlists decided to forge electoral coalition with PNV; when concluded as "lista católico-fuerista" it enabled Rodezno, elected from Navarre, to resume his parliamentary career in 1931. (Note: Another Carlist elected from Navarre was Joaquin Beunza. Detailed analysis in Serrano Moreno 1988, and 1989.) In the Cortes he was the least-Basque minded among Carlist deputies; (Note: highlighting differences between "these" [Basque] provinces and Kingdom of Navarre.) he ceased to support the autonomy draft when it turned out that it would not allow autonomous religious policy and started to toy with the idea of an exclusively Navarrese statute.

Already in the late 1920s advocating reconciliation with the Mellistas, Rodezno more than welcomed re-unification of three Traditionalist streams in the new organization, Comunión Tradicionalista. Early 1932 he was appointed to its Supreme National Junta, intended to assist the ailing Jefe Delegado, marqués de Villores. After his death in May that year Rodezno was nominated its president, effectively becoming the Carlist political leader.

Rodezno was acutely sensitive to threat of revolution and convinced that democracy could not contain it; he responded warmly to the mood of authoritarian nationalism, covering in his opinion a broad spectrum from fascist Mussolini regime to MacDonald's National Government. Hostile especially to militant republican secularism and agrarian reform, he remained vehement opponent in the parliament and was once hit by a flying glass in return. Touring the country he boasted that “Carlist shock troops are ready to defend society against Marxist threat”. However, he was not among those pressing an insurgent strategy. Aware of the planned Sanjurjo coup he steered clear of direct collaboration, which did not spare him expropriations administered by the government afterwards.

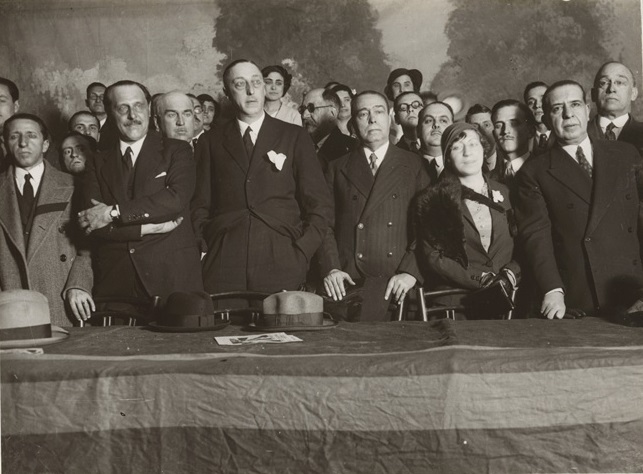
Rodezno at Carlist meeting, 1932

Rodezno's term as the leader emphasized politics and propaganda rather than organization and militancy; some scholars claim that obsolete structures of Communión, favoring "placentera y anárquica autonomia", could not bear the weight of dynamically growing movement. This, combined with internal protest against pro-Alfonsist advances and his "tactica transaccionista y el gradualismo", brought about a major challenge. When former Integrists suggested that Manuel Fal become president of the Junta, Rodezno proposed he rather become personal secretary to the claimant. As Don Alfonso Carlos at that time decided to abandon plans of dynastic reconciliation, (Note: in 1935 Rodezno pressed Don Alfonso Carlos to nominate Don Juan as heredero.) in April 1934 Rodezno agreed to step down from leadership. He remained the local Navarrese jefe.

== Conspiracy and coup ==
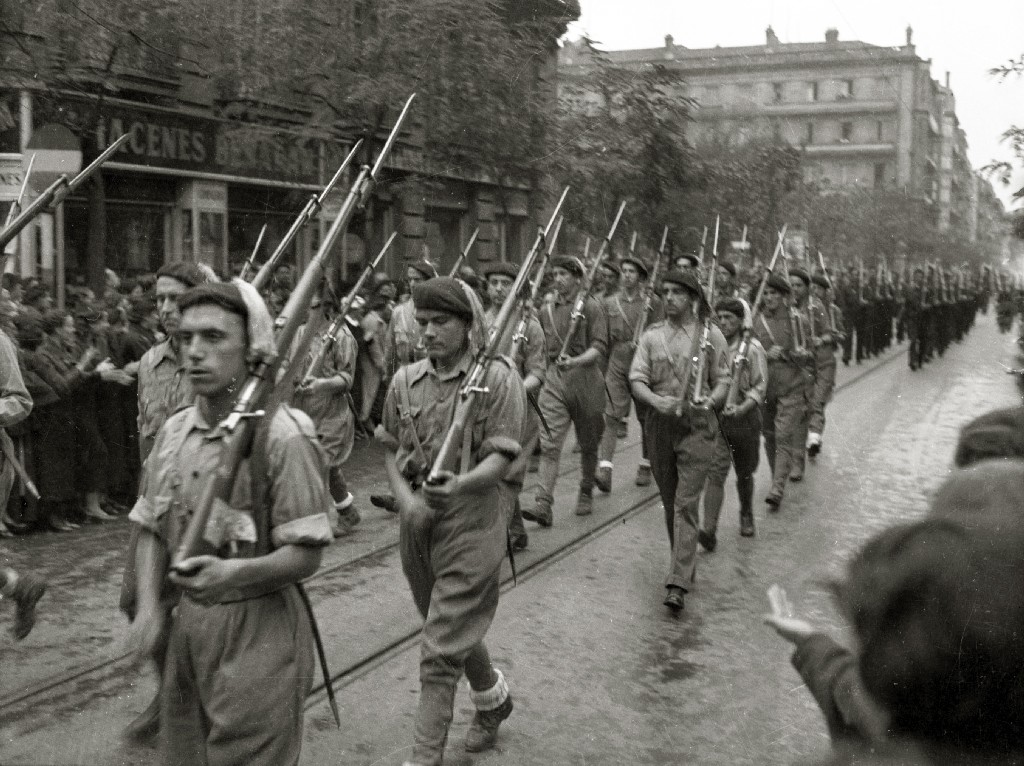
Requetés in captured San Sebastián, 1936

Though Rodezno's supporters complained about "fascistización" of the Communion under the new leadership of Fal, (Note: what was meant by that was probably strong leadership and organizational build-up of the party and its satellite structures; some Carlists grumbled at uninspiring mediocre Fal compared to eloquent and gregarious Rodezno.) Carlism firmly changed course from political negotiations to organizational build-up. (Note: including the paramilitary. However, it was Rodezno who agreed to a send few Carlists, together with Alfonsists conspirators, to Rome; the objective was military training, negotiating financial support and arms supply.) Rodezno was not appointed head of any of the newly created sections, nominated to Consejo de Cultura instead. Fal initially considered Rodezno an acceptable leader and insisted on changing structures rather than people. He criticised Rodezno rather for lack of faith. (Note: "El jefe delegado ideal es Rodezno. Solo le falta fe en lo nuestro") Re-elected to the Cortes in 1933 and 1936, Rodezno became chairman of the 10-men Carlist minority. He was permitted to pursue talks with the Alfonsinos on the private business basis; in 1936 these contacts started to take shape of negotiating a joint insurgency. (Note: he also visited in prison José Antonio Primo de Rivera.) According to one source he was on the target list of the hit-team which, in his absence, shot Calvo Sotelo instead.

Rodezno played vital role in negotiating Carlist role in the military coup. Talks between Mola and Fal stalled as both failed to reach a compromise on terms of the Carlist access; (Note: Fal demanded that Republican regime is replaced with corporative Catholic state, possibly a monarchy, and insurgency is directed by a directory headed by Sanjurjo and including two civilians acceptable to the Comunión. Mola insisted on Republican regime and state separated from the Church, with insurgency commanded by the military at their own discretion.) at that point the general opened parallel talks with Navarrese leaders, headed by Rodezno. Bypassing Fal and ready to confront him if needed, (Note: he considered purely a Carlist rising "a ludicrous dream" and nurtured no doubt that alliances are needed; Republic should be overthrown as first objective, with further goals to be discussed later. What interested him was not so much the total victory of Carlism – attractive as that was – as obtaining of certain minimum gains plus control over their own corner of Spain.) they suggested that Navarrese issues are discussed locally and offered requeté support in return for usage of monarchist flag and assurance that Navarre would be left as Carlist political fiefdom. Facing sort of internal rebellion, Fal considered dismissing the entire Navarrese junta. (Note: some authors claim that Fal refrained from taking steps against the Navarrese junta conscious that also the Navarrese rank-and-file were more than enthusiastic to join the insurgency regardless of the terms agreed.) He was finally outmaneuvered when Rodezno and the Navarros assured conditional support of claimants' envoy, Don Javier; (Note: who initially opposed compromising 100 years of Carlist history in exchange for local ayuntamientos.) Mola and Fal decided to act together on the basis of a vague letter, sent by pre-agreed leader of the insurgency, general Sanjurjo. (Note: its basic lines were that Carlists may conditionally use monarchical flag, provisional government would be apolitical with civilian members, Republican legislation rectified, parties would be abolished and "new state" would be built.)

During the coup Rodezno was in Pamplona, the city easily captured by insurgents. Though Fal considered him disloyal, in late August he had no option but to include Domínguez in Junta Nacional Carlista de Guerra, a newly constituted Carlist wartime executive; within this body he entered Section of General Affairs heading Delegación Política, a sub-section entrusted with handling relations with military junta and local authorities. Rodezno settled in the emergent military headquarters in Salamanca, (Note: Fal, heading the Military Section, settled in Toledo.) but went on pursuing independent policy engineered by a local Navarrese executive, transformed into Junta Central Carlista de Guerra de Navarra. (Note: some scholars claim JCCNG was "liderada por el conde de Rodezno", though other authors maintain that it was formally headed by Berasáin. Its official constituting document does not contain the name of Rodezno at all.) Following death of the claimant and assumption of regent duties by his successor Don Javier, the so-called Rodeznistas were visibly disappointed with Fal's confirmation as political leader in October 1936. (Note: the rodeznista-controlled El Pensamiento Navarro wrote that "monarchists live even if kings die", a rather ambiguous statement given Carlists had a regent not a monarch now.)

Carlist standard

The Carlists, who initially imagined their position as equals of the military, within few months acknowledged that they were being reduced to junior role, especially that despite mobilization of their supporters, Falange attracted far more recruits. (Note: compare graphs and tables in Parejo Fernández (2008).) Their attempt to safeguard autonomous standing crashed in December 1936, when following Fal's decision to set up a Carlist military academy he was summoned to Franco's headquarters and presented with the choice between firing squad and exile abroad. (Note: details in del Burgo Tajadura (1992).) Some authors speculate whether the unusual overreaction of Franco was not intended to get rid of Fal and replace him with complacent Rodezno. At the Carlist emergency meeting the Rodeznistas enforced the decision to comply with the exile alternative, (Note: Canal (2000) gives the date as January 1937.) though later Rodezno himself visited Franco trying to get Jefe Delegado re-admitted. (Note: noting that though he considered the idea of a Carlist military academy tempting, at the same time he did not approve of the way Fal pursued it.)

== Unification ==
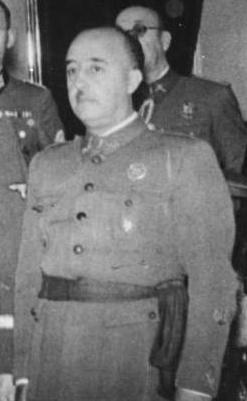
Francisco Franco

With Fal on exile and party leadership assumed by France-based Don Javier, Rodezno emerged as "máxima figura carlista en España"; Fal was not happy about Rodezno's pre-eminence and when on exile intended to send him abroad, possibly on a diplomatic mission to Vatican. Starting January 1937 he and other party bigwigs were approached by the military and the Falangists about forming a monopolist state party; (Note: the first meeting recorded was with Sancho Dávila in early January 1937.) the pressure started to mount later on. The Carlist leaders met 3 times to address the challenge: in Ínsua (February), in Burgos (March) and in Pamplona (April), all attended by Rodezno. (Note: early March Rodezno moved to his Cáceres estate and remained there until April 12, when he was summoned to Burgos by Franco.) He and the faction he headed advocated compliance with political amalgamation, pressed by the military; (Note: according to his own account, when summoned to Burgos on April 12 he told Franco that in Portugal it had not been necessary to create partido único, to which Franco replied that Salazar did not enjoy popular support. The caudillo made clear that unification would not be transitory phase but an ultimate objective.) they were confronted by the Falcondistas, opting for intransigence. (Note: most thorough account of Carlist response to the unification threat in Bernaldo (1996); somewhat less detailed but still very informative chapters in Pérez (2008).) As the formal party executive Junta Nacional was getting decomposed and theoretically local, Rodeznista-dominated Junta Central assumed a key role, (Note: Bernaldo (1996) prefers to talk about "carlismo regional" prevailing over "carlismo nacional"; he also notes that one of the factors enhancing position of JCCGN over JNG was that there were still new requeté tercios being formed in Navarre in the spring of 1937) the balance tipped towards unification. The fusion was presented as means to build a new state, Catholic, regionalist, (Note: "organización estatal que reconozca las peculiaridades regionales" Until mid-1937 Rodezno believed that decentralised vision based on "autarquias regionales" was possible and called not to revert to "centralismo liberal".) social and ultimately formatted as Traditionalist monarchy. (Note: most Carlists might have understood this as future instauration of a Carlist dynasty, e.g. the Borbón-Parmas, the Borbón-Habsburgos or other, Rodezno has probably meant a dynastical accord with the Alfonsinos, most likely with Franco nominated regent for Don Juan de Borbón.)

On April 22 Rodezno was nominated to Secretariado Político (Note: some authors refer to this body as Junta Política or Secretería General. In official Francoist document the body was referred to as "Secretariado o Junta Política".) of the new party, Falange Española Tradicionalista, one of 4 Carlists (Note: the other three were Luis Arellano, Tomás Dolz de Espejo and José María Mazón Sainz) within the 10-member body. The Falangists like Girón were extremely unhappy about its performance and composition, with very few members "fielmente el espíritu de nuestro Movimiento". Rodezno and other Carlists learned of the party program only once its 21 points were announced and immediately demonstrated some unease. (Note: he was also susprised and concerned by detention of Manuel Hedilla. Franco assured Rodezno that Traditionalist doctrine will be embodied in outlook of the new party "en su dia") His relations with Fal and Don Javier remained extremely tense, though falling short of total breakup; both considered him a fronding rebel; he was held among, "maximos responsables de la actitud de rebeldia mantenida por el carlismo navarro frente a la autoridad de don Javier". Rodezno's efforts to elicit authorization from the regent produced no effect. During the next few months he presided over absorption into Falange rather than a fusion, (Note: opinions of Payne, Canal, Blinkhorn, and Fraser, approvingly referred by Martorell Pérez (2008).) bombarded with queries and protests from Carlist rank-and-file about total predomination and arrogance of camisas azules. (Note: detailed discussion in Peñalba Sotorrío 2013, especially the chapter Conflictos y tensiones durante el periodo de integracion. Un analisis estadistico, pp. 91-105. The province where most formal complaints were received was the Integrist stronghold, Seville (220), followed by Navarre (169) and the Catalan provinces, Cadiz and Ourense (60-90).) Possibly as a result of complaints about the Falangists' lack of give and take in October 1937 Franco called up theoretically governing structure of the party, the National Council; (Note: at this point Secretariado Politico ceased to function; in fact, Rodezno ceased to take part in its sittings already in August 1937. Within its ranks the Carlists were even worse-off, only 11 of them among its 50 members. Canal (2000) claims there were 12 Carlists, while Payne (1987) claims the correct number is 13.) Despite Fal's calls to decline, Rodezno accepted the seat and in December 1937 Don Javier expulsed him from Carlism; Rodezno did not take notice. Some authors claim he was expulsed already in the spring, following accepting post in Secretariado.

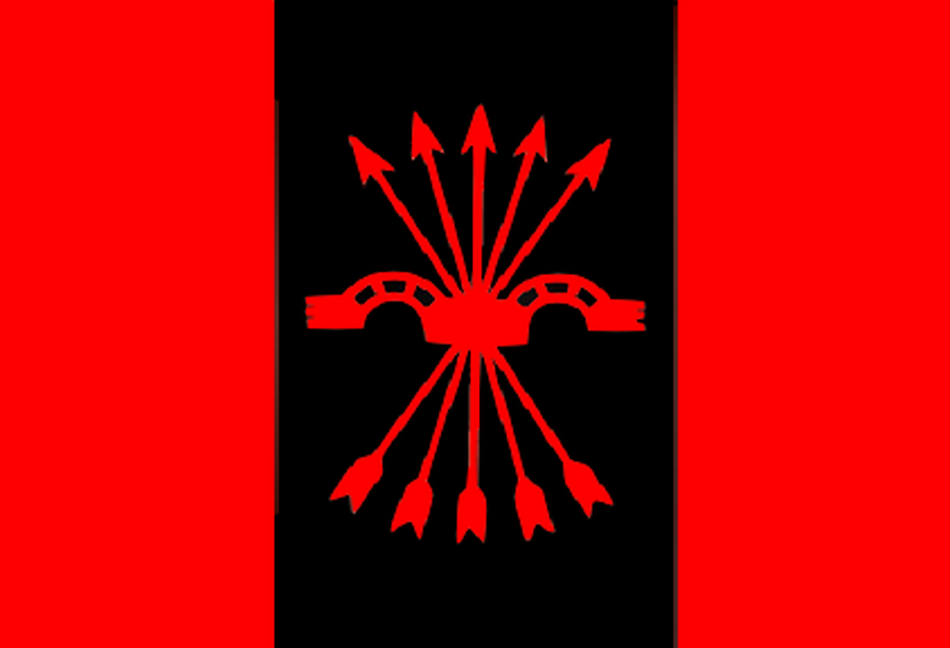
Falangist standard

Rodezno's motives are unclear; apart from partisan claims that he traded Carlist principles for a few Navarrese alcaldías, (Note: dubbed "el traidor por unas alcaldías".) there are many conflicting interpretations offered. According to one, he feared that internal divisions within the Nationalist camp might lead to defeat in the war. (Note: though he does not mention Rodezno personally, also Payne points to this feature. Putting common goal against particularisms on the Nationalist side is also confronted with internal power struggle within the Republican camp.) According to another, he has never been a genuine Carlist and is better described as a conservative monarchist. (Note: version coined mostly by Melchor Ferrer, Historia del Tradicionalismo Español, vol XXIX, referred after Martorell Pérez 2008, p. 183; another scholar seems to adhere, noting that Rodezno also sided with "corriente conservadora autoritaria" rather than with "populismo tradicionalista".) Some scholars claim that he was a possibilist, who realized that Traditionalism was unable to seize power single-handedly and needed coalition partners; (Note: according to this approach, unlike ideologically driven Fal, Rodezno was above all a realist who considered that ideal of a purely Carlist seizure of power as a dream. Alliances were inevitable and as its result, Carlists might have to settle for the second-best option. This does not necessarily boil down to the "dead-end street" vision of Carlism; Rodezno viewed it as a spiritual and ideological force guiding a new formation, built possibly on a new monarchist but fundamentally Traditionalist platform.) one more clue might have been that perceiving Carlism as rooted in family and regional values, he downplayed the issues of organization and structures. Others underline that he considered the emerging system largely in line with the Carlist vision and did not think it worthwhile to be marginalized for the sake of defending second-rate discrepancies. Finally, there are authors who believe that he realized neither gravity of the moment nor totalitarian nature of the new party; Rodezno – the theory goes – imagined the structure either as a new incarnation of Unión Patriotica or as a loose alliance, both permitting Carlism to maintain its proper identity; immediately following announcement of the FET programme, largely a copy-paste from the original Falange 27 points, Rodezno visited Franco to voice his disgust; following three months he ceased to attend sittings of the FET secretariat, considering it pointless.

== Francoism ==
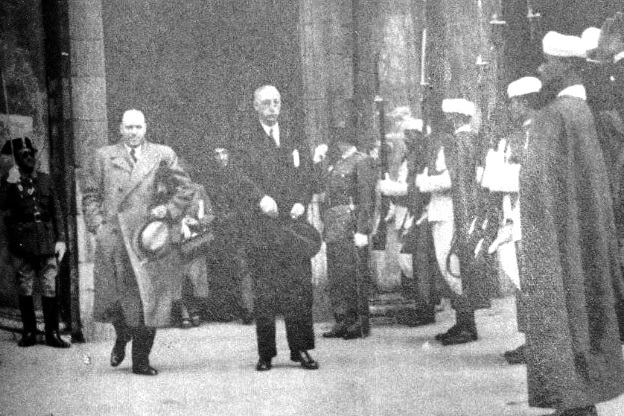
with Romualdo de Toledo, leaving FET Consejo Nacional, 1939

In January 1938 Rodezno entered the first regular Francoist government as Minister of Justice. At this position he commenced work on revoking the Republican laws, focusing mostly on the laic legislation. Though the task was completed by his successor, it was Rodezno who ensured that the Church re-took a key role in a number of areas, especially education, and that intimate Church-state relations were restored. When setting the direction he had to overcome the Falangist resistance and outmaneuver its key exponents, Jordana and Yanguas. He is best remembered, however, for his role in Francoist repressions. Wartime purges rested on most tortured juridical basis and produced some 72,000 executions; it is difficult to tell to what extent Rodezno might be held liable, especially that most of them were carried out under military jurisdiction and before he assumed office. He started to replace the chaotic practice by laying the foundations of the repressive Francoist judicial system. Its first pillar, Ley de Responsabilidades Políticas, retroactive to 1934, was adopted in 1939, supplemented by many other laws and regulations. There were some 100,000 political prisoners before he stepped down as minister in August 1939.

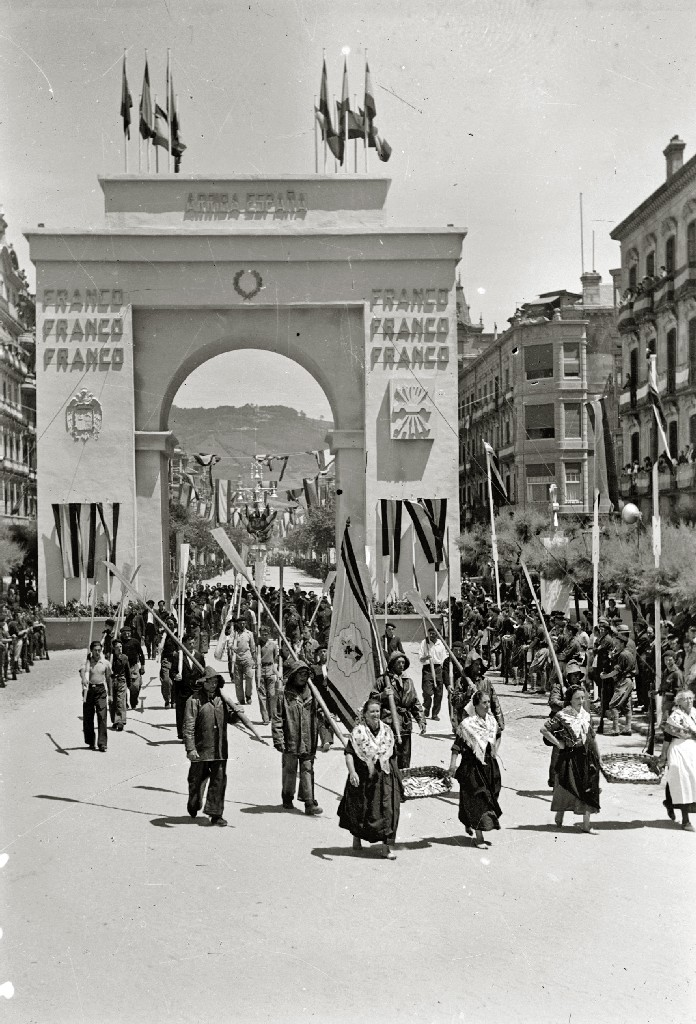
Francoist Spain, 1939

It is not clear whether Rodezno's departure from the government was related to tension between the Falangists and the Carlists, though he was on rather poor terms with Serrano Suñer, already in early 1938 heavily disappointed with the new party and the emerging regime in general. In 1939 he moved back to Navarre. Though expelled from formally illegal Comunión Tradicionalista he was eager to take part in the movement. Some authors consider him leader of Rodeznistas, the informal collaborative faction, other scholars prefer to name him leader of Navarrese Carlism or even of Spanish Carlism altogether. In the immediate post-war period he tried to support Carlist cultural outposts, either preventing their amalgamation in the Francoist machinery or creating the new ones. Some orthodox Carlists considered him indispensable, as it was with their support that Rodezno was elected vice-president of Navarrese Diputación Provincial in 1940. At this post he took part in provincial battle for power against the Falangists and clashed with some of their leaders also on the national level; it is partially thanks to his efforts that Navarre was, together with Álava, the only province which retained some regional establishments.

Though apparently overwhelmed fascistoid nature of the emerging regime and by actual shape of the unification - up to contributing to its failure in Navarre - Rodezno kept pursuing the collaborative line even when it became painfully evident that Carlism was entirely marginalized in the new state party. In 1943 Rodezno resigned from the Navarrese government to enter the Francoist quasi-parliament, Cortes Españolas; he was ensured its mandate as member of Consejo Nacional. The term lasted three years and was not renewed in 1946, which suggests that at that time he had already dropped out from the Falangist executive.

== Juanista ==
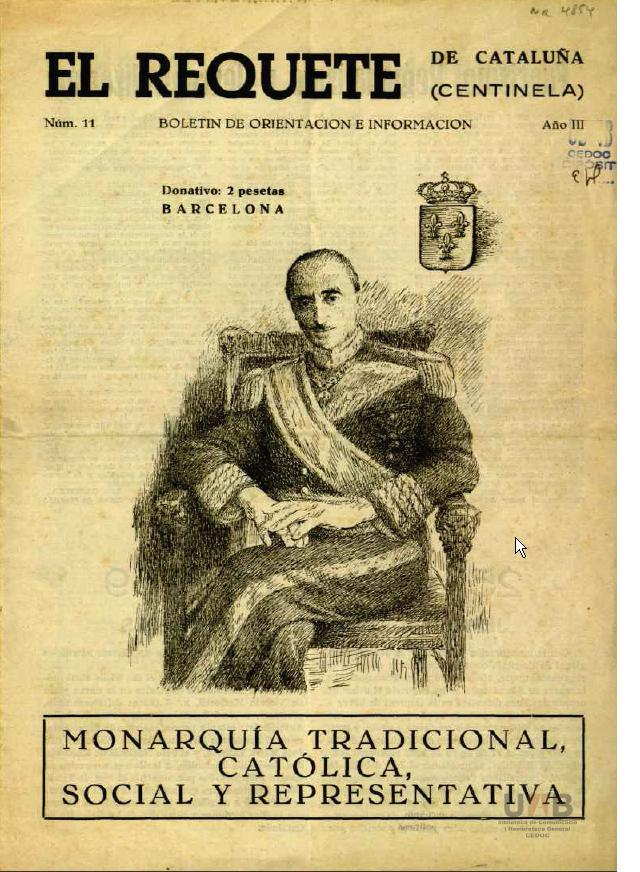
Don Javier on the cover of a Carlist periodical

Already in the 1910s Rodezno timidly advanced the idea of transferring legitimist rights to an appropriate Alfonsist candidate once the Carlist dynasty would extinguish; also during the Republican years he was the most enthusiastic supporter of rapprochement within the monarchist camp and in 1935 proposed that Don Alfonso Carlos names Don Juan his legitimate heir. When the last direct Carlist claimant indeed died in September 1936 Rodezno was the last to acknowledge the regency of Don Javier. At that time he was already considering another regency, this of Franco on behalf of Don Juan, whom he held well familiar with Traditionalist ideas. It is not clear when the two first met; during the Civil War Rodezno and the Alfonsist prince already exchanged friendly correspondence. Rodezno was in touch with Don Juan since 1937 and considered him knowledgeable of Traditionalist ideas.

In the early 1940s Rodezno turned into an open advocate of Don Juan as a future Carlist king, especially once the latter inherited the Alfonsist title after his late father in 1941. Theoretically this support did not breach the rules of Don Javier's regency, which permitted forming factions around prospective candidates; in practice this mattered little, as Rodezno was already expulsed from the Comunión. When the new Alfonsist claimant was assembling a team of collaborators, José María Oriol travelled to meet him in Lausanne to suggest (in vain) that Rodezno is nominated the official Alfonsist representative in Spain. In the mid-1940s Fal mounted an offensive offering various Carlist regentialist solutions to Franco; in December 1945 Fal also wrote to Don Juan asking him to acknowledge the regency of Don Javier. As a response, in April 1945 Rodezno travelled to Portugal (Note: monarchist alliance concept was made easier by Don Javier's unhappy absence in 1944-1945, when he was held captive in the Nazi concentration camp.) to meet Don Juan and prepare ground for his Carlist legitimization. The initiative bore fruit in February 1946, when the Alfonsist claimant signed a Rodezno co-drafted document, intended to confirm his Traditionalist spirit. Known as "Bases institucionales para la restauración de la monarquía" or simply as "Bases de Estoril", it outlined the basics of the future monarchy. They very much resembled the Traditionalist principles, though the document fell short of declaring Don Juan the legitimate Carlist claimant. (Note: "Religión, Unidad, Monarquía, representación orgánica".)

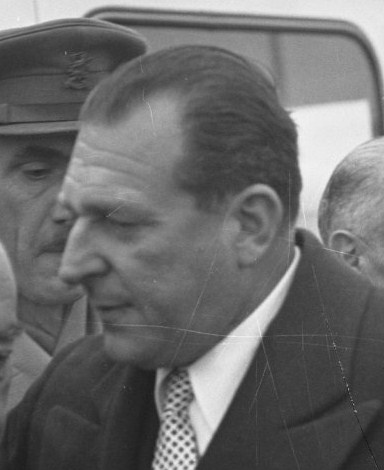
Juan de Borbón

The 1946 "Bases de Estoril" was the last major Rodezno's initiative and little is known either about his political views or about his public activity in the very last years of his life. In 1944 he entered Real Academia de Jurisprudencia y Legislación. He remained leader of informal but very significant collaborative and pro-Juanista faction of Carlism, the movement which as a whole was rapidly disintegrating into even more branches. (Note: carloctavistas, sivattistas, javieristas, rodeznistas) Though most Carlist rank-and-file remained utterly hostile to the despised Liberal dynasty, many if not the majority of Carlist pre-war leadership inclined towards accepting Don Juan. Also after Rodezno's death they kept pursuing the idea of Alfonso XIII's son assuming the Carlist title. Named Rodeznistas, Juancarlistas, Juanistas or Estorilos they officially declared Don Juan the legitimate Carlist heir in 1957, the act considered climax of the earlier Rodezno's policy. In 1957 around 70 Carlist politicians travelled to Estoril and declared Don Juan the legitimate Carlist heir. The late Rodezno was considered "principal promoter" of the initiative. Some authors even claim that Rodezno was present at the ceremony. In historiography the term "Rodeznistas" is last applied to the year 1959.

== Legacy and reception ==
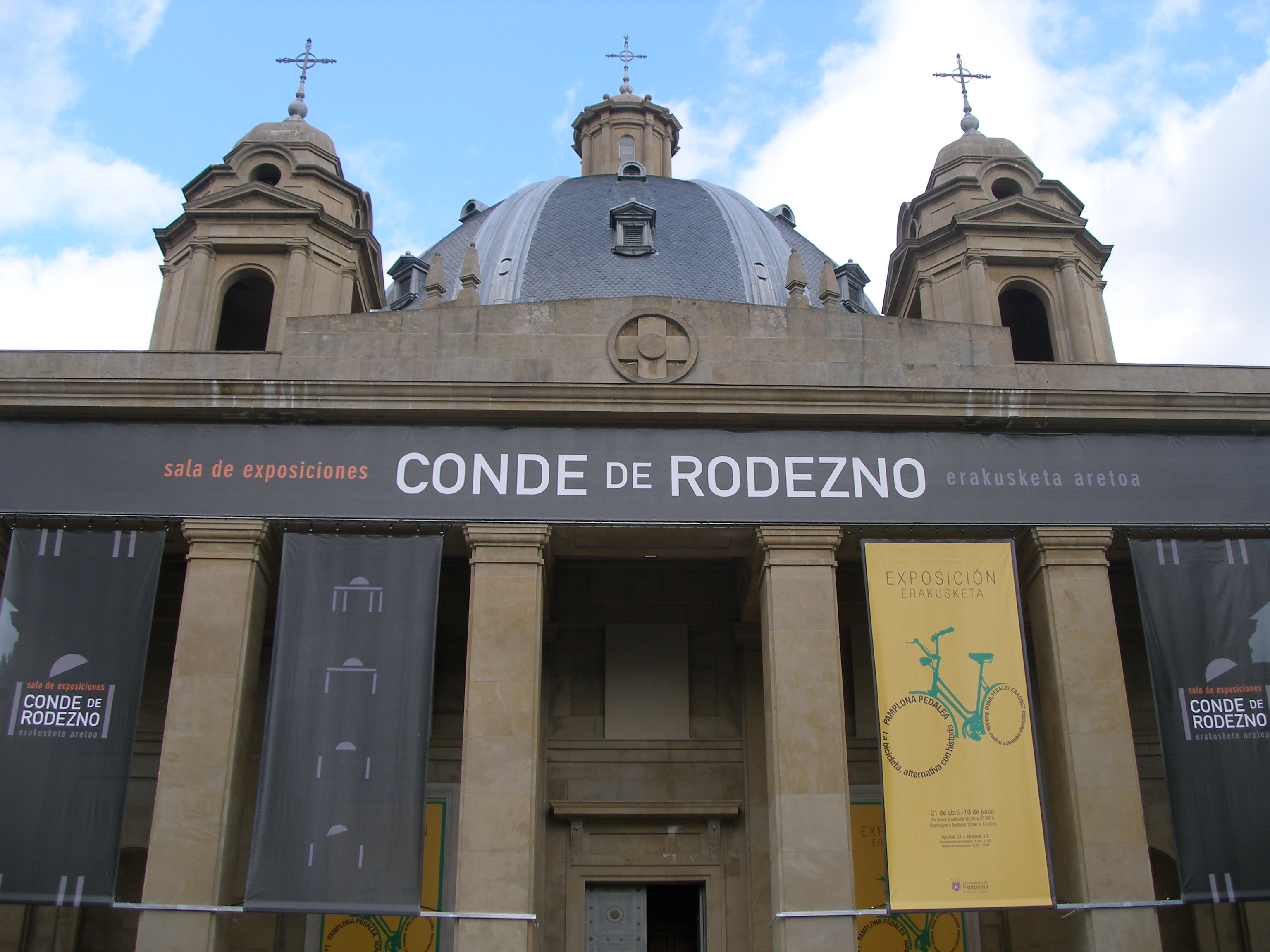
old banner (now unused) (Note: picture taken in 2007. For 2012 banner, see here)

During Francoism Rodezno was honored by a number of prestigious orders, like Cruz de Isabel la Católica or Cruz de San Raimundo de Peñafort; in the mid-1940s he entered Real Academia de Jurisprudencia y Legislación and Real Academia de la Historia, named also hijo predilecto by the province of Navarre and by his native town of Villafranca. Posthumously Franco conferred upon him Grandeza de España, title currently born by his descendants. Some streets and plazas were named upon him, the most prestigious one in Pamplona.

After transition to democracy the perception of Rodezno changed dramatically. In the current Spanish public discourse he is associated mostly with the most repressive phase of Francoism. Naming of the Pamplona plaza was subject to heated public debate in Navarre and elsewhere following adoption of ley de Símbolos de Navarra and ley de Memoria Histórica. The 2008-2009 discussion, involving present-day political parties and related to some present-day political issues, (Note: like the question of Navarrismo and the Basque role in Navarre) has eventually led to renaming the plaza to "Conde de Rodezno", an aristocratic title formally not associated with any individual, (Note: it might refer to Tomás Domínguez Arévalo, but also to his father Tomás Domínguez Romera, his maternal grandfather Justo Arévalo y Escudero or previous holders of the title from the Jiménez-Navarro family.) until in 2016 it was renamed to "Plaza de la Libertad". The former Pamplona mausoleum erected during Francoism to honor the fallen requetés has been renamed to "Sala de exposiciones Conde de Rodezno" but in public it prefers to be named "Sala de exposiciónes". In 2008 Audiencia Nacional, the Spanish high tribunal, launched formal bid to acknowledge Rodezno as guilty of crimes against humanity during his tenure as Minister of Justice and afterwards, but the motion bore no fruit due to procedural reasons. Judge Baltasar Garzón was later charged with perversion of justice for launching the bid, which was defined as an error by the Supreme Court of Spain. In 2010 a group of authors associated with a Pamplonese Ateneo Basilio Lacort published a vehemently militant work which presents Rodezno as a criminal.

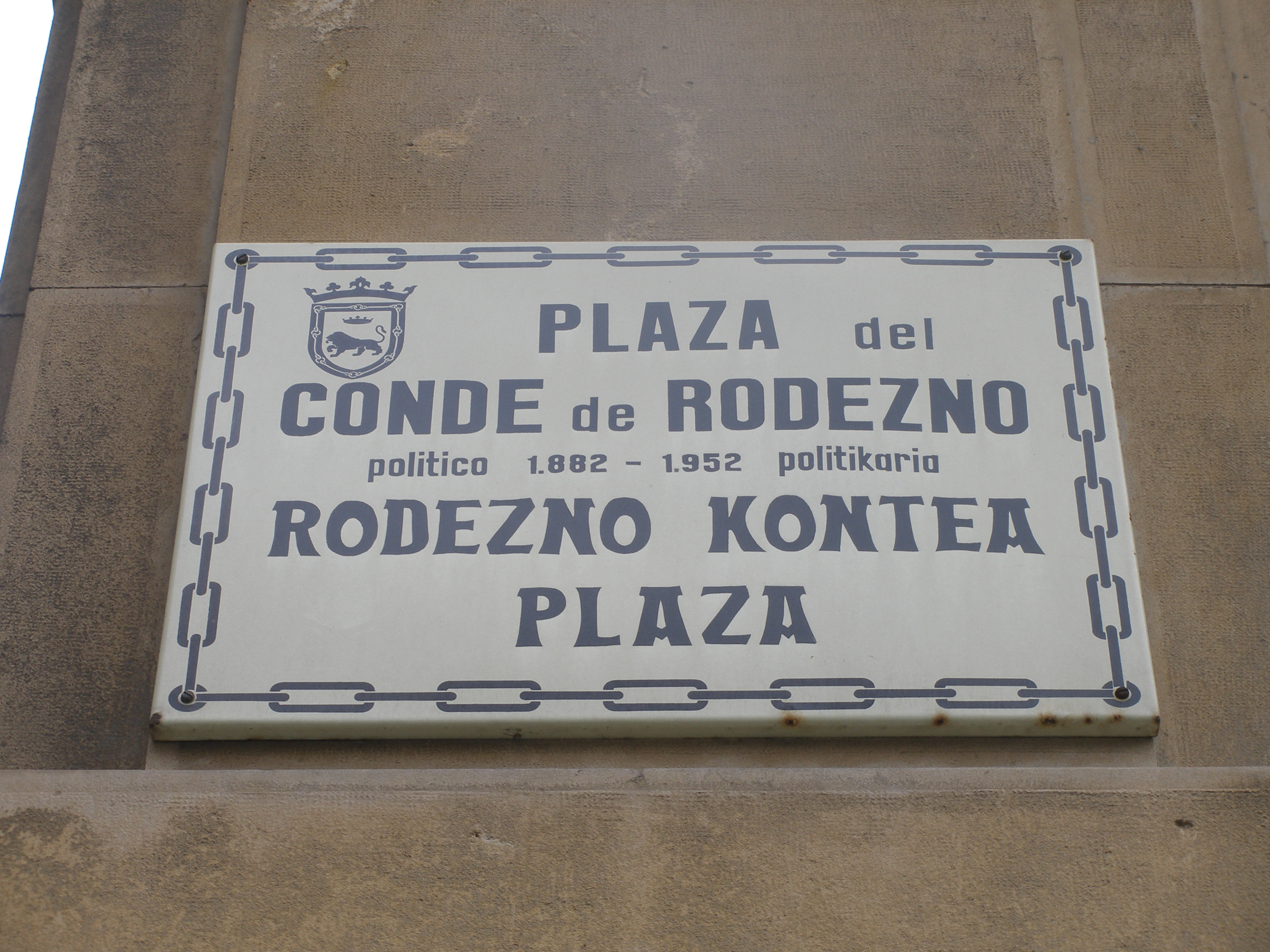
former placard (now removed)

In Traditionalist historiographical narration Rodezno is one of the black characters, among the likes of Rafael Maroto, Alejandro Pidal or Don Carlos Hugo. He is charged with blatant political miscalculation at best and with treason of principles and kings at worst. His vacillating stance during the Mellista crisis in 1914–1919, rapprochement towards the Alfonsinos in the Republic years or bypassing Carlist command when pushing for almost unconditional adherence to the generals' coup of 1936 are less of an issue; it is Rodezno's stance on unification and pro-Juanista lobbying which earned him most hostility from works of Partido Carlista sponsored socialismo autogestionario supporters. (Note: like Clemente 1977, 1999, and 2011, or Pérez-Nievas Borderas 1999, to scholarly discourse flavored by political sympathies like Martorell Pérez 2009, to orthodox Traditionalist discourse of Alcalá 2001.) Though scholars speculate on his different motives, the opinion which gained particular popularity is that he has never been a genuine Carlist, adhering to the movement mostly out of respect for his father. (Note: "Rodezno no sentía el carlismo, no pensó nunca en su triunfo y, con su característica ligereza, podría decirse que lo aceptaba como aquel personaje de Valle Inclán que lo quería declarar monumento nacional (...) Sus opiniones pro-alfonsinas acrecentaban el confusionismo de unos y los recelos de los leales. Cuando al fin dio el paso definitivo, reconociendo públicamente como su Rey al pretendiente Don Juan, coronaba una historia política de una lógica implacable, pero aquel día perdía la única virtud que, en los salones aristocráticos, tenía el Conde de Rodezno: el mantenerse leal a la dinastía legítima", opinion of Melchor Ferrer quoted after Martorell Pérez 2009.) None of the currently existing organizations claiming Carlist identity, be it either those pursuing a socialist path (javierocarlistas, Partido Carlista) or those attached to Traditionalist values (tronovacantista CTC, sixtinos, carloctavistas) admits deference to his name.

== See also ==
- Carlism
- Electoral Carlism (Restoration)
- Navarrese electoral Carlism (Restoration)
- Francoist Spain
- Carlo-francoism
- White Terror (Spain)
- Institución Príncipe de Viana
- Condado de Rodezno

== Sources ==
- Alcalá, César (2001). D. Mauricio de Sivatte. Una biografía política (1901-1980). Barcelona. ISBN 8493109797.
- Juan-Cruz Alli Aranguren, Los inicios del franquismo en dos obras inéditas del conde de Rodezno, [in:] Huarte de San Juan. Geografía e Historia 30 (2023), pp. 217–249
- Blinkhorn, Martin [in Spanish] (2008). Carlism and Crisis in Spain 1931-1939. Cambridge. ISBN 9780521086349.
- del Burgo, Jaime (1992). Un episodio poco conocido de la guerra civil española. La Real Academia Militar de Requetés y el Destierro de Fal Conde.
- del Burgo, Jaime (2013). El carlismo y su agónico final.
- Canal, Jordi (2000). El carlismo. Madrid. ISBN 8420639478.
- Calleja, Eduardo; Aróstegui, Julio (1994). La tradición recuperada: el Requeté Carlista y la insurrección.
- Clemente, Josep Carles [in Spanish] (1977). Historia del Carlismo contemporaneo. Barcelona. ISBN 9788425307591.
- Clemente, Josep Carles [in Spanish] (1999). Seis estudios sobre el carlismo. Madrid. ISBN 8483741520.
- Clemente, Josep Carles [in Spanish] (2011). Breve historia de las guerras carlistas. Madrid. ISBN 978-8499671710.
- Conde de Rodezno. La justicia al revés, Iruña-Pamplona 2010, ISBN 9788476816332
- Agustín Fernández Escudero (2012). "El marqués de Cerralbo (1845-1922): biografía politica" (PDF). Madrid.
- Jesús María Fuente Langas, Elecciones de 1916 en Navarra, [in:] Príncipe de Viana 51 (1990), pp. 947–957
- Pavón, Jesús (1954). Semblanza del Conde de Rodezno.
- Payne, Stanley G. (1987). The Franco Regime. London. ISBN 9780299110741.
- Manuel Martorell Pérez, Retorno a la lealtad; el desafío carlista al franquismo, Madrid 2010, ISBN 9788497391115
- Martorell Pérez, Manuel [in Spanish] (2009). La continuidad ideológica del carlismo tras la Guerra Civil (Thesis). Valencia.
- Jesús Pabón, Elogio académico del Conde de Rodezno, [in:] Jesús Pabón, Días de ayer, historias e historiadores contemporáneos, Barcelona 1963, pp. 67–71
- Ramón de Andrés Martín, Juan (2000). El cisma mellista. Historia de una ambición política. Madrid. ISBN 9788487863820.
- Martínez Sánchez, Santiago (2002). "El Cardenal Pedro Segura y Sáenz (1880-1957)" (PDF). Pamplona.
- Mercedes Peñalba Sotorrío, Entre la boina roja y la camisa azul, Estella 2013, ISBN 9788423533657
- Peñas Bernaldo de Quirós, Juan Carlos (1996). El Carlismo, la República y la Guerra Civil (1936-1937). De la conspiración a la unificación. Madrid. ISBN 9788487863523.
- Pérez-Nievas Borderas, Fermín (1999). Contra viento y marea. Historia de la evolución ideological del carlismo a través de dos siglos de lucha. Pamplona. ISBN 8460589323.
- José María Toquero, El carlismo vasconavarro y Don Juan de Borbón. La influencia del conde de Rodezno, [in:] Euskal herriaren historiari buruzko biltzarra 7 (1988), pp. 261–274
- Vallverdú i Martí, Robert (2008). El Carlisme Català Durant La Segona República Espanyola 1931-1936. Barcelona. ISBN 978-8478260805.
- Aurora Villanueva Martínez, El carlismo navarro durante el primer franquismo, 1937-1951, Madrid 1998, ISBN 9788487863714
- Aurora Villanueva Martínez, Organización, actividad y bases del carlismo navarro durante el primer franquismo [in:] Gerónimo de Uztáriz 19 (2003), pp. 97–117
