= Agustín Coppel =

Mexican businessman (born 1961)

- Born: Agustín Coppel Luken; 1961 (age 64–65); Culiacán, Sinaloa, Mexico
- Education: Monterrey Institute of Technology and Higher Education
- Occupation: Business executive
- Title: Chairman, Coppel

Agustín Coppel Luken (born 1961) is a Mexican businessman. He is the Chairman of the Board of Directors of the Mexican retail and financial services company Grupo Coppel and was previously the Group's CEO. He is known for leading Coppel's diversification into banking and retirement funds through the creation of subsidiaries BanCoppel and Afore Coppel.

== Early life and education ==
Agustín Coppel Luken was born in Culiacán, Sinaloa. He earned a degree in marketing from the Monterrey Institute of Technology and Higher Education (ITESM).

His father, Enrique Coppel Tamayo, founded Grupo Coppel in Sinaloa in 1941. In 1982, his eldest son Enrique Coppel Luken assumed the management of the company, and in 2008 Agustín was appointed CEO and Chairman of Grupo Coppel.

== Career ==
In the early part of his career, Coppel Luken tended registers at Coppel stores and then was placed in charge of clothing and furniture, before becoming store manager. He rose within the company, eventually becoming the Group's Director of Marketing and Distribution Operations.

In April 2007, Coppel Luken became the first president of the newly founded BanCoppel.

In November 2007, he led the initiative to acquire the mortgage lender Crédito y Casa, which Expansión noted made Coppel the first Mexican company to combine retail, banking and mortgage services.

In 2008 Coppel Luken was appointed CEO and Chairman of Grupo Coppel. He played an active role in the company's international expansion, launching operations in Brazil and Argentina in 2010.

In 2013, he received the Montblanc de la Culture Arts Patronage Award.

In 2015, Coppel Luken led the company's acquisition of the discount department store chain Viana for 2.5 billion pesos.

In September 2020, Coppel Luken introduced the company's move to open the clothing and footwear outlet store chain Fashion Market and the motorcycle store Coppel Motos.

In 2024, Coppel Luken was awarded the Gold Medal from the Americas Society and was included in Expansión's list of "The 100 Most Important Businesspeople in Mexico," ranking among the top 10 entrepreneurs who generate the most jobs in the country.

Coppel Luken is the honorary chairman of the Foro Mar de Cortés, a civil organization that promotes sustainable development in several Mexican states.

In July 2025, Grupo Coppel announced a new leadership structure where Coppel Luken remained Chairman of the Board, while his nephew, Diego Coppel Sullivan, assumed the role of CEO.

Coppel Luken is also a board member of the Mexicanos Primero foundation. He supports the Botanical and Zoological Society of Sinaloa and provides donations to the Culiacán Botanical Garden.

== Personal life ==
Coppel Luken and his wife founded the non-profit organization Colección Isabel y Agustín Coppel (CIAC A.C.), which supports the research and dissemination of art through various artistic projects and contemporary practice research.
