= Tomás Domínguez Romera =

Spanish politician

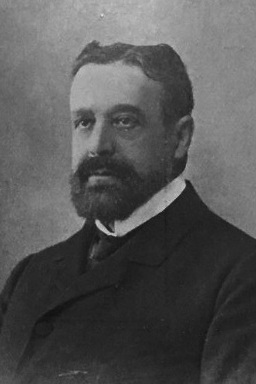
- Born: 1848; Carmona, Spain
- Died: 1931 (aged 82–83); Madrid, Spain
- Occupation: landholder
- Known for: politician
- Political party: Carlism

Tomás Domínguez Romera Pérez de Pomar, 11th Marquess of San Martín, Count consort of Rodezno, Count consort of Valdellano (1848–1931) was a Spanish aristocrat, landholder and politician. He supported the Carlist cause. His political climax fell on the years of 1905–1916, when during 4 consecutive terms he represented the district of Aoiz in the Congress of Deputies, the lower chamber of the Cortes. In the 1910s he held the Carlist regional jefatura first in New Castile and Extremadura, and then briefly in Andalusia; at that time he was also member of the nationwide party executive.

== Family and youth ==
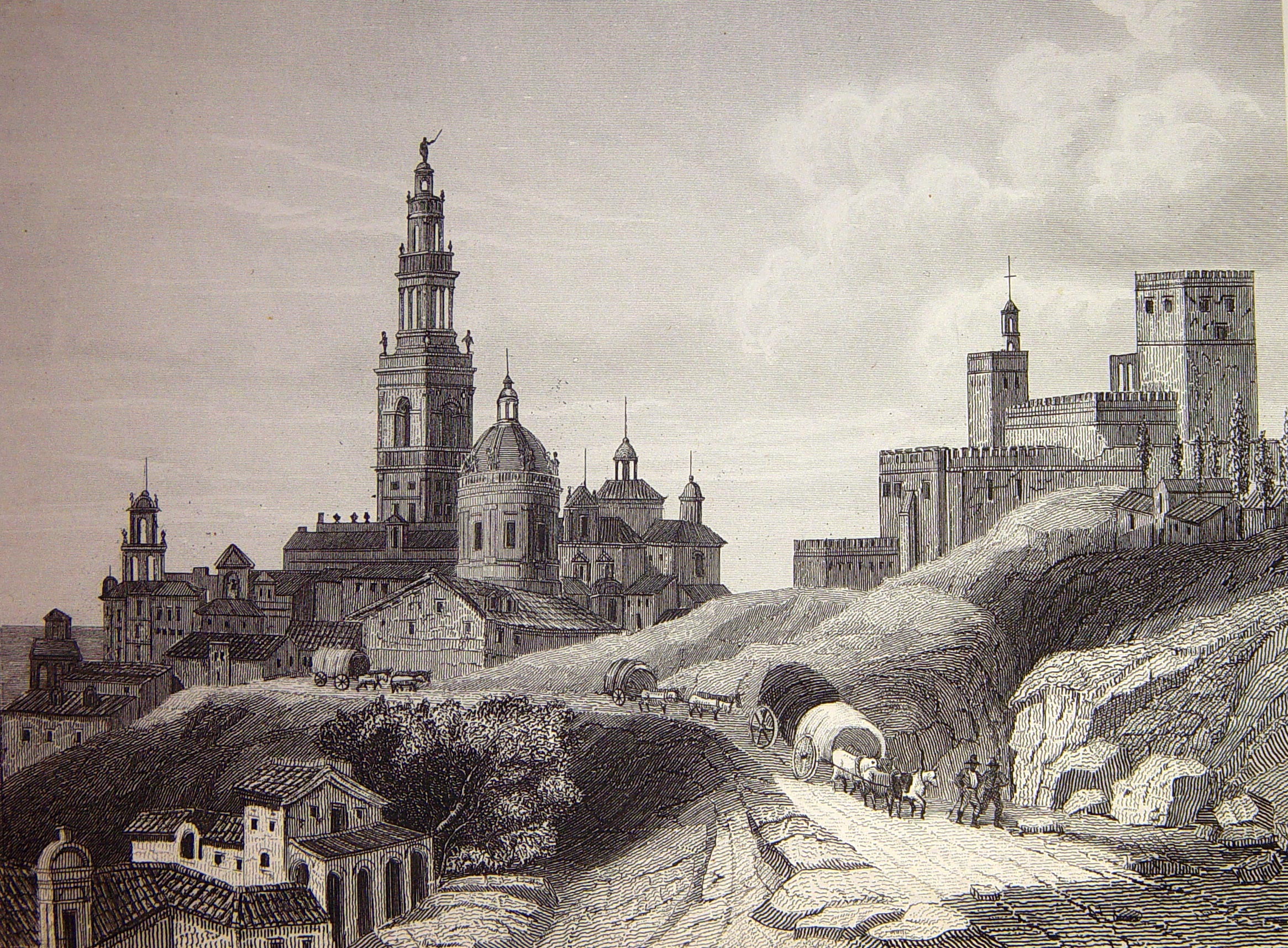
Carmona, mid-19th century

Tomás was descendant to a few well-off Andalusian landholder families. The Domínguez and the Trigueros have long been noted as distinguished figures in the city of Carmona (Seville province); one representative of the Domínguez branch was regidor of the municipality in the late 18th century. Apart from large rural estates, the Domínguez family owned also a large house in the city. The father of Tomás, José Domínguez Trigueros (died 1888), rose to high positions as well; in the 1840s he was the mayor of Carmona, the post which later went to his brother, Manuel Domínguez Trigueros. At unspecified time he married a distant relative akin because of their common Trigueros ascendants, Carmen Romera Pomar. She descended from another terrateniente family from Carmona, prestigious especially along her maternal line; since 1681 it was holding the title of Marqués de Ariño and her maternal grandfather Vicente Pomar y Cavero was the 6. Marqués.

José and Carmen had at least two sons, Manuel and Tomás Domínguez Romera. It is not clear what was the size of combined rural estates owned by the couple; upon inheriting their possessions, Tomás was mentioned in the press as a very wealthy man. None of the sources consulted provides any information on his early education. Later he followed the path typical for males of his class: some time in the mid-1860s he enrolled in the faculty of law at the University of Seville and graduated in 1873. Some official sources have later listed him as "abogado", but there is no evidence that he has ever practiced; he lived off the real estate owned and was referred to as “rico propietario”.

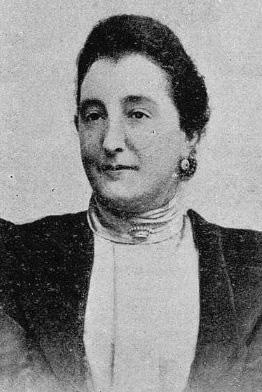
Wife

In 1881 Domínguez Romera married María de los Dolores de Arévalo y Fernandez de Navarrete (1854-1919). She descended from an aristocratic Riojan-Navarrese Arévalo family. Her father, Justo Arévalo Escudero, was a conservative politician; in the 1850s and the 1860s he served in the lower chamber of the Cortes, while between the 1870s and the 1890s he held a chair in the senate. In 1877 María inherited the titles of Condesa de Rodezno and Condesa de Valdellano; upon marriage Domínguez Romera became conde consorte. In 1908 she inherited large landholdings around Villafranca; the Andalusian and the Riojan-Navarrese estates of the couple were separated by some 600 km. In 1911 Domínguez Romera claimed and was granted the title of marqués de San Martin. Tomás and María lived mostly in their apartment in Madrid and in Villafranca. They had two sons; Tomás Domínguez Arévalo inherited the Rodezno and San Martín titles, while José María Domínguez Arévalo took over this of Valdellano. Both became Carlist politicians. In 1932-1934 the former held the nationwide party leadership and later became one of key politicians of early Francoism; the latter briefly headed regional party structures in New Castile.

== Early Carlist engagements ==
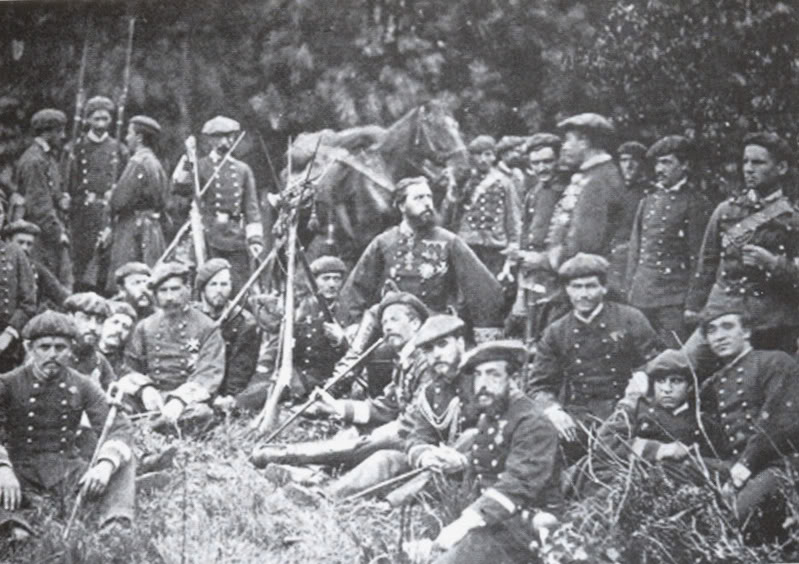
Carlos VII during Third Carlist War

Political preferences of Domínguez’ ancestors are not clear and it is obscure how he became related to Carlism, the movement which enjoyed little appeal among the Andalusian landholders. It is not known whether as mayor of Carmona his father represented any political current; however, some sources suggest that he might have nurtured a Traditionalist inclination. Already as a student Tomás got involved in right-wing para-political engagements; he was among co-founders of Juventud Católica of Seville and became secretary of the local Asociación de Católicos. During final years of the Isabelline monarchy in the late 1860s he reportedly "took active part in the battle of ideas", the turmoil which eventually ended up in so-called Glorious Revolution. During the Third Carlist War of the mid-1870s Domínguez was busy developing the clandestine Carlist network in Andalusia, but no details are available. His labors caught attention of the authorities and as a result, he decided to leave Spain. For some time he lived on exile in Paris but returned either in the late 1870s or in the early 1880s.

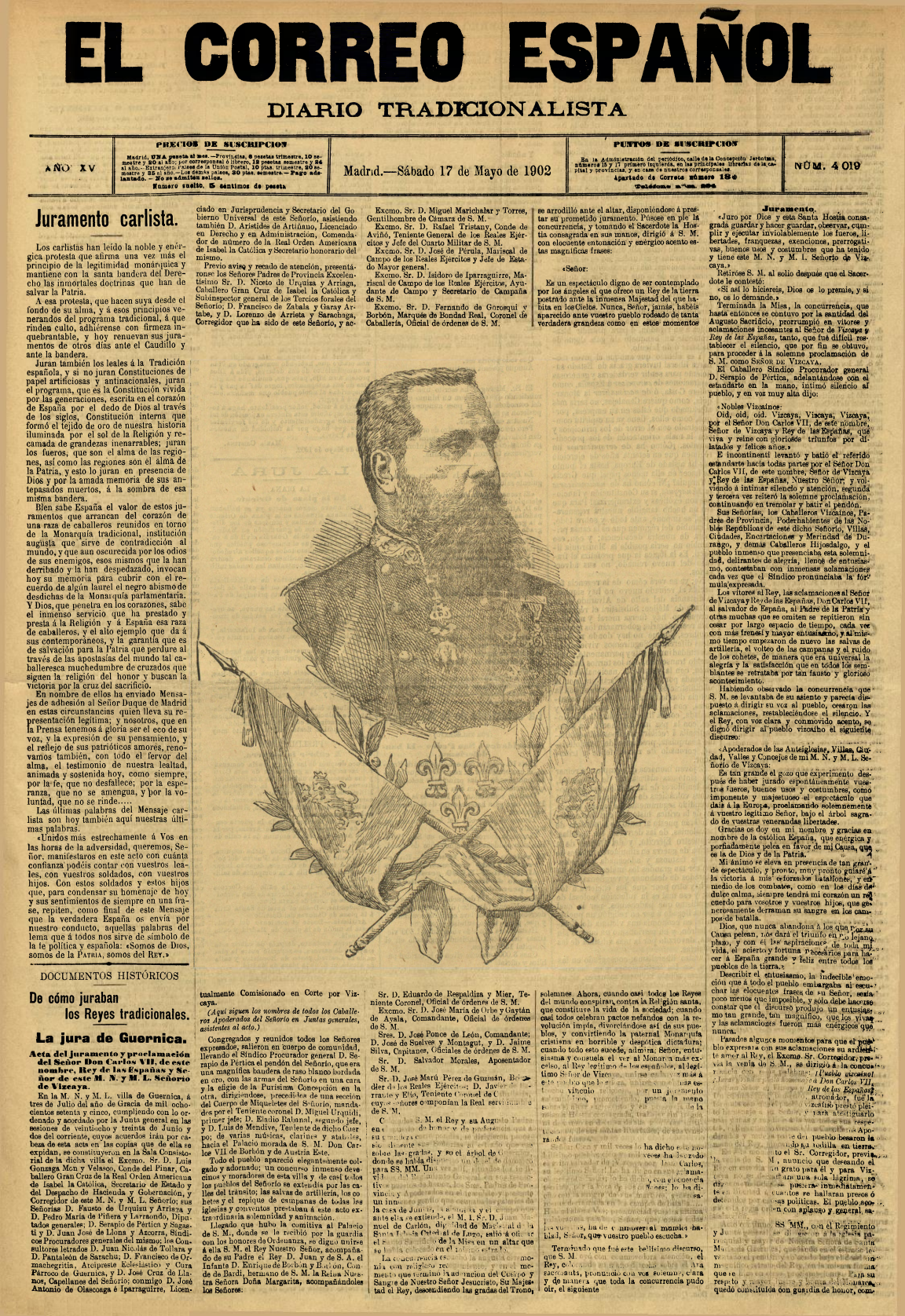
El Correo Español

Once back in Spain Domínguez did not return to his family Carmona estate, but together with his newly wed wife they settled in Madrid. He engaged in reconstruction of shattered Carlist structures in the capital, which soon translated into attempts to animate the local branch of Comunión Católico-Monárquica, the pre-war party organization. In the mid-1880s he was among co-founders of Círculo Carlista de Madrid; in 1887 he became president of Secretaría General of the Madrid branch of the revamped party structure, now known as Comunión Tradicionalista. In 1888 Domínguez assumed the role of president of Comisión de Propaganda of the Madrid party organization; the same year he rose to Secretario General of the Madrid executive, the body at the time led by Marqués de Cerralbo.

Since the mid-1880s Carlism was increasing paralyzed by a conflict between the claimant Carlos VII and the chief theorist of the movement, the charismatic Ramón Nocedal; apart from personal rivalry, it was conditioned by different visions of political priorities and the strategy to be adopted. In 1888 the strife climaxed in open rebellion of the so-called Nocedalistas, soon to be known as Integrists. Within the Madrid organization Domínguez sided with Cerralbo against Nocedal and opted for loyalty to his king. As the breakaways controlled two key Traditionalist newspapers, La Fé and El Siglo Futuro, the loyalists remained with no Madrid-based daily which could serve as the semi-official national party mouthpiece. Domínguez Romera and Cerralbo labored to create an alternative press platform; their works were crowned with success in 1889, when the new Carlist daily El Correo Español was launched.

== Parliamentary career ==
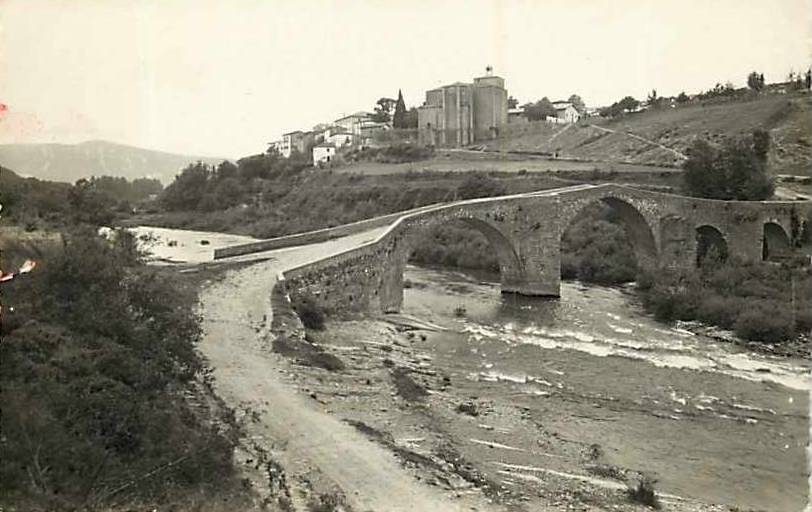
Aoiz, early 20th c.

During the electoral campaign of 1891 Domínguez stood as a Traditionalist candidate for the Cortes in the Riojan district of Santo Domingo de la Calzada, where together with his wife he owned some real estate; he was defeated by a small margin by the local liberal cacique Amós Salvador, the nephew of Mateo Sagasta. During the following campaign of 1893 he resumed his bid, this time from another Riojan district, Haro; it is not clear whether he was defeated or he withdrew. Neither historiographic works nor the press of the era provide any evidence that Domínguez tried his hand in elections of the late 1890s or the early 1900s. When noted in newspapers of that time, it was only due to his role in the party; he emerged as president of Círculo Tradicionalista de Madrid. He was moderately involved in propaganda activities; the address he delivered at the opening of a local círculo gained attention of the authorities and he was officially investigated by a local judge.

In the 1905 elections Domínguez decided to compete in the Navarrese district of Aoiz, in the 1890s dominated by the liberal Gayarre family. The bid proved successful by a small margin, as he gained 3.892 out of 7.763 votes cast; in the Cortes Domínguez formed a small, 4-member Carlist minority. During the following campaign of 1907 he was re-elected from Aoiz, this time with 5.713 out of 5.896 votes and as one of 14 Carlists in the chamber. This success was repeated in 1910, still from the same district (5.547 out of 8.602, 9-person minority), when he defeated the liberal counter-candidate Manuel Borrero Carrasco. The fourth consecutive triumph came in 1914; this time no-one dared to challenge him and he was declared elected according to the notorious Article 29. Domínguez served until 1916; during the campaign of this year he ceded the place to his son, who was elected in 1916 and 1918. In 1918 he was initially reported to stand in Pamplona, but there is no evidence that he indeed fielded his candidacy.

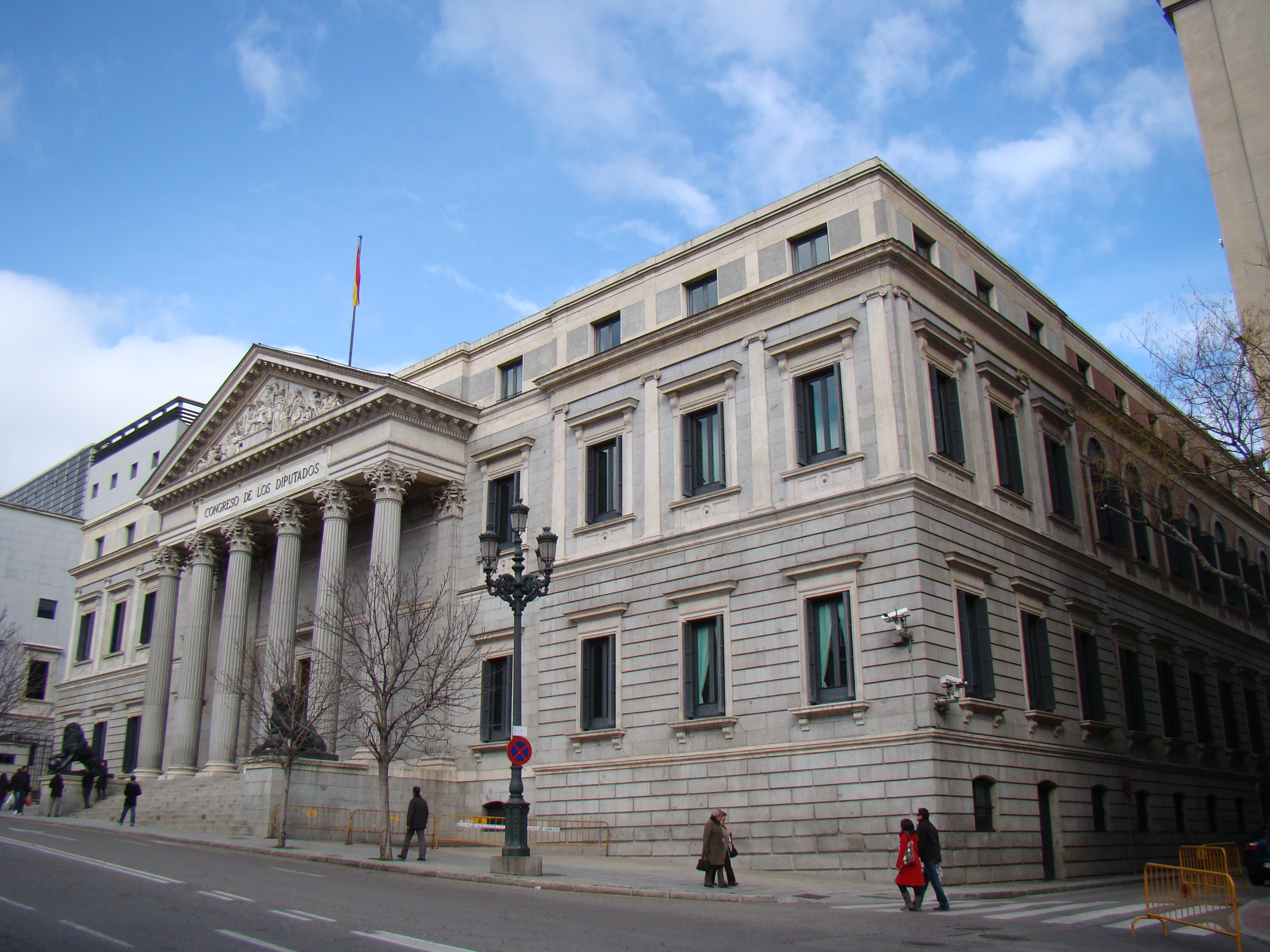
Congress of Deputies (at present)

Domínguez was not a major figure within the Carlist parliamentary representation; unlike the likes of his fellow Carlist deputy Juan Vazquez de Mella he was not known for brilliant addresses in the chamber. He was only few times mentioned in the press as taking to the floor. His most vehement activity was related to the so-called Ley del Candado, legislation endorsed by the liberal government in the late 1900s and intended against religious orders; like the entire minority, he did his best to block the initiative. In 1911 he tried to build a far-right alliance of various minor parliamentary groups; some scholars dub it a “betrayal” of the mainstream Carlist line, but others think it a typical parliamentary maneuvering with no major impact. In 1912 he entered the budgetary commission of the Cortes.

== From Carlist tycoon to Carlist retiree ==
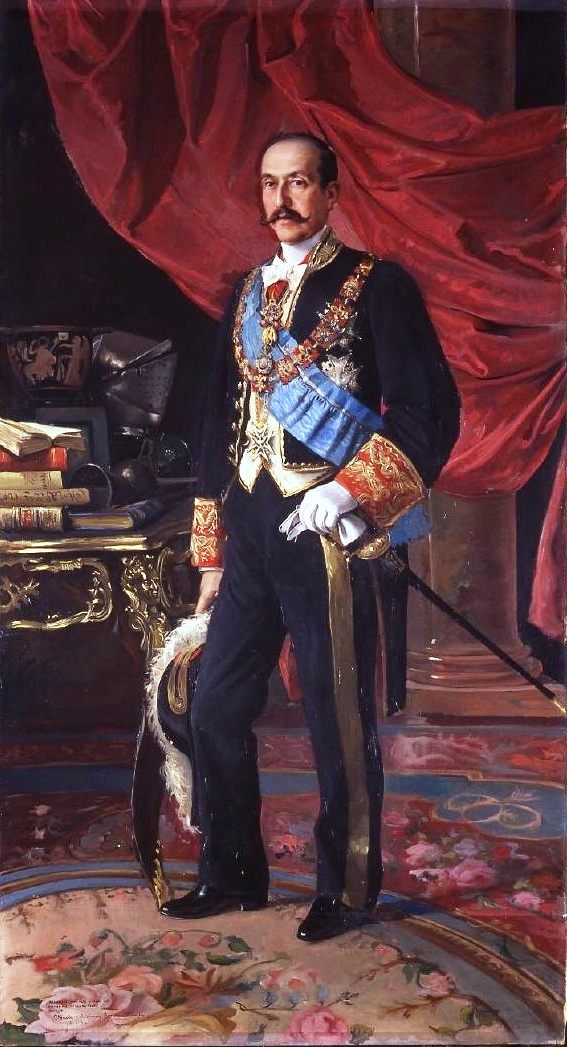
Cerralbo

Along Cerralbo, Domínguez emerged as one of two key Carlist politicians in Madrid. He co-led Traditionalist events in the capital, e.g. in 1907 during the funeral of Marqués de Vallecerato or in 1909 during funeral ceremonies of Carlos VII. In 1910 latest he was nominated president of Junta Regional for New Castile and Extremadura; as such he entered the nationwide Carlist executive. At the turn of the decades he interchanged with Cerralbo, Feliú and Vazquez de Mella when presiding over banquets, though he was noted for presence in close sessions rather than in open rallies. The new claimant Jaime III confirmed his membership in Junta Nacional, where among 16 members he kept representing Madrid and Castilla la Nueva. In 1913 he was nominated head of Comisión de Tesoro de la Tradición, a sub-section responsible for party finances. In 1918 he vacated the seat of regional leader in New Castile and as a stopgap measure he became Jefe Regional de Andalucia.

It is not clear what was the position Domínguez adopted during internal rivalry between so-called Cerralbistas, followers of the 1899-deposed Cerralbo, and the party leaders in 1899-1912, Matías Barrio y Mier and Bertolomé Feliú y Pérez; given his nominations it seems he remained on good terms with both factions. Since the early 20th century he took part in banquets which celebrated the key Carlist theorist Juan Vázquez de Mella; as he was close friend of Cerralbo and as the latter was under great influence of de Mella, it might have seemed that also Domínguez was close to the Mellistas. However, when in 1919 the long-brewing conflict between de Mella and the claimant Don Jaime translated into an open confrontation, Domínguez decided to stay loyal to his king. At the time he was already over 70 and in the party he was gradually being replaced by his son, Tomás Domínguez Arévalo; he did not take part in the grand 1919 meeting known as Magna Junta de Biarritz, supposed to set the future direction of Carlism.

Carlist standard

There is close to nothing known about Domínguez’ political engagements after 1919, apart that he remained in the mainstream Carlist current loyal to Don Jaime. Already a widower, he was noted as conde viudo, while the titles of conde de Rodezno and conde de Valdellano were assumed by his sons. Scholars claim that he welcomed the Primo de Rivera coup of 1923, remained on good terms with the dictatorial regime and with the dictator personally. In the mid-1920s some Catalan Carlist hotheads mounted a loose scheme intended as a coup against Primo; when working on personalities, they tentatively shortlisted "Conde de Rodezno" as the future Ministro de Estado. Domínguez Romera was neither involved nor consulted; both the security services of the dictatorship and himself were surprised to find the name in the documents, prepared by the conspirators. It was the last episode involving him; as an octogenarian he was already in very poor health and he remained totally withdrawn into privacy.

== See also ==
- Carlism
- Traditionalism (Spain)
- Navarrese electoral Carlism during the Restoration
- Electoral Carlism (Restoration)

== Footnotes ==
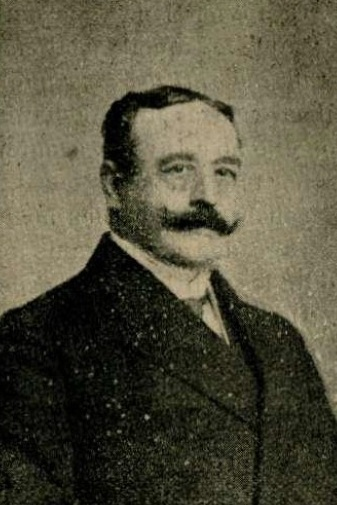
in his 50s
