= Vianna =

Vianna is a surname (an archaic spelling of Viana). Notable people with the surname include:

- Arnaldo Vianna (1947–2026), Brazilian politician
- Caio Vianna Martins (1923–1938), Brazilian Scout
- Herbert Vianna (born 1961), Brazilian singer, songwriter and guitarist
- João Vianna (born 1963), Brazilian basketball player
- José Vianna da Motta (1868–1948), Portuguese pianist and composer
- Klauss Vianna (1928–1992), Brazilian dancer, choreographer and theater director
- Lucila Vianna da Silva (born 1976), Brazilian handball player
- Oduvaldo Vianna Filho (1936–1974), Brazilian playwright
- Tyrteu Rocha Vianna (1898–1963), Brazilian poet
- Vitor Vianna, Brazilian mixed martial artist

== See also ==
- Viana (disambiguation)
- Viana do Castelo Municipality, a Portuguese municipality
- Vianna da Motta International Music Competition, a music competition
- Vianna Gardiner, Bahamian politician
