= Viana =

Viana may refer to:

== Places ==
- Viana, Luanda, Angola
- Viana, Espírito Santo, Brazil
- Viana, Maranhão, Brazil
- Viana do Castelo, Portugal
- Viana, Spain in Navarre
- Viana (comarca), Ourense, Galicia, Spain
  - Viana do Bolo, a municipality in the comarca

== People ==
- Hugo Viana (born 1983), Portuguese footballer
- José Roberto Viana dos Santos (born 1956), Brazilian footballer and manager
- Letticia Viana (born 1987 or 1988), Swazi football referee
- Marcelo Viana (born 1962), Brazilian mathematician
- Marcus Viana (born 1953), Brazilian musician

== Other uses ==
- Vianna, alternate spelling
- Viana (department store), a Mexican discount chain
- Viana (gastropod), a genus of land snails
- Esporte Clube Viana, a Brazilian football club based in Maranhão state

== See also ==
- Prince of Viana
