= Viana (department store) =

Mexican department store chain

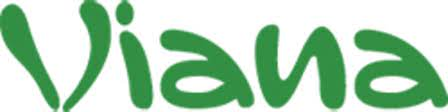
Logo

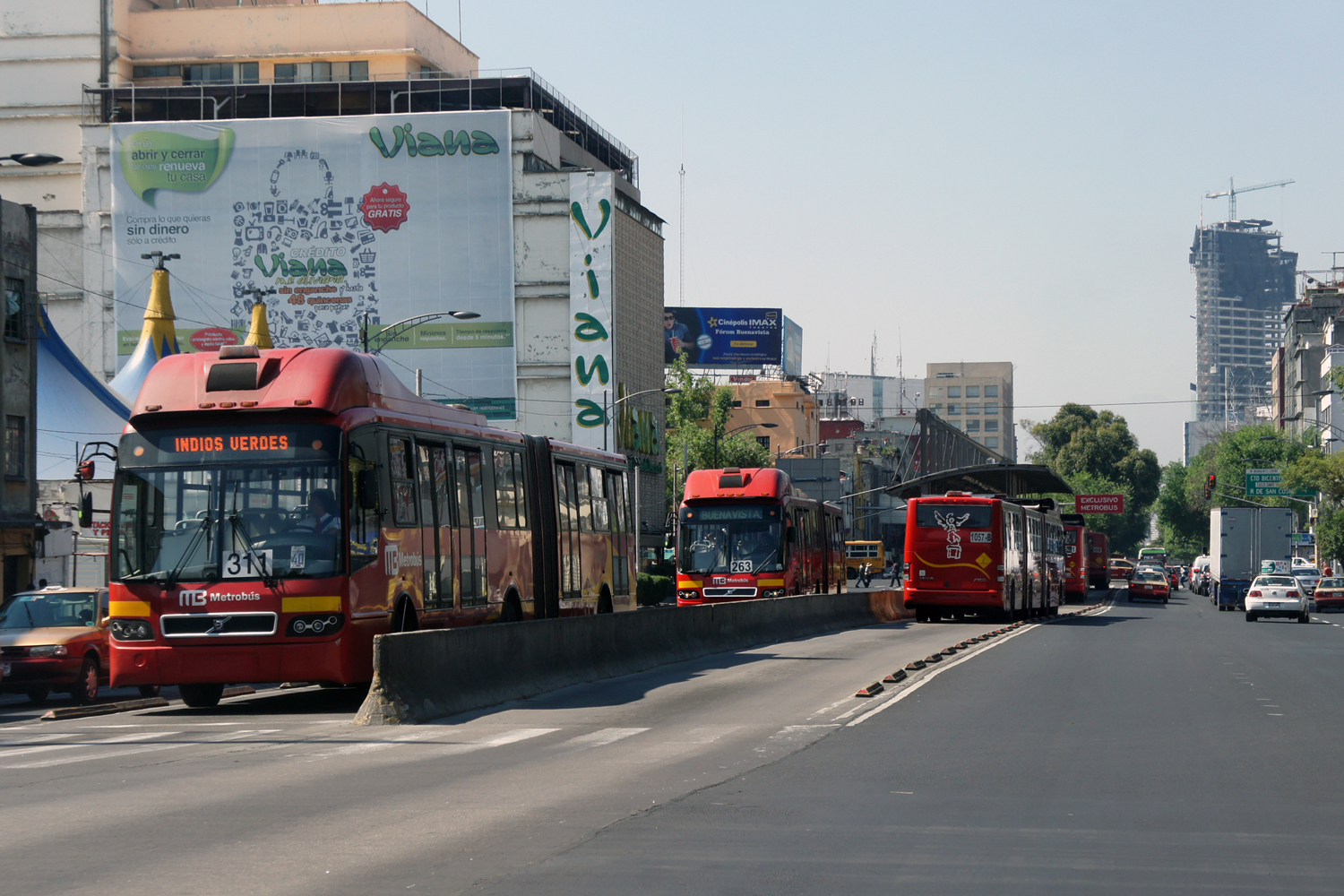
An old Viana store in 2014 (background)

Viana was a discount department store chain in Mexico specializing in white goods (home appliances), bedding, and towels, as well as clothing, furniture, cosmetics and technology.

The chain was founded in 1953 with its matriz or flagship on Eje Central Lázaro Cardenas at Salto de Agua in the Historic Center of Mexico City. In 2010, Viana acquired the 12-branch furniture chain Muebles Frey. As of 2014 it had 35 branches in Greater Mexico City and 15 more elsewhere in Mexico.

As early as 1963, Business Week noted Viana as "Viana, the most serious appliance discounter in Mexico City".
