= Agoitz =

Town and municipality in northern Spain

Coordinates: 42.783°N 1.367°W

Aoiz
- Agoitz / Aoiz
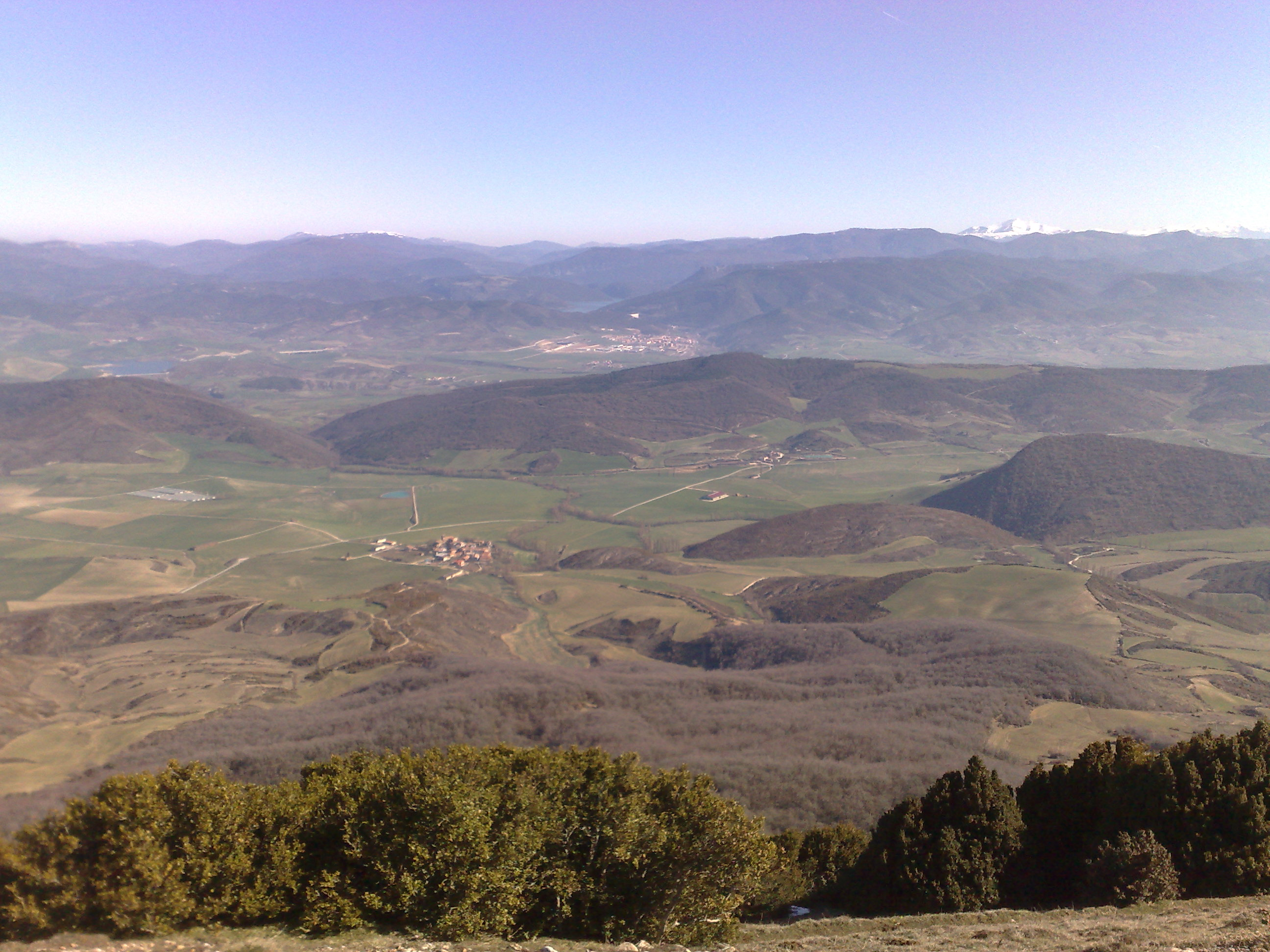

- Flag Coat of arms

- Location within Navarre Location within Spain
- Country: Spain
- Autonomous Community: Navarre
- Time zone: UTC+1 (CET)
  - Summer (DST): UTC+2 (CEST)

Agoitz, or Spanish Aoiz, is a town and municipality located in the province and autonomous community of Navarre, northern Spain. Established in the 10th century, the town has a well preserved medieval center and a long cultural tradition.

== Etymology ==
The name of the town has been spelled various ways throughout history, as cultures and languages shifted. The town has intermittently been referred to as Aoiz, Itoiz, Agoiz, Aoiza, Agoiza, Agoize, and Ahoiza. Its inhabitants are sometimes referred to as Agoiskos.

== History ==
The earliest recorded habitation in the lands around Aoiz date to the Mesolithic period, after earlier peoples descended from the Pyrenes mountains to settle the Irati river valley. Early inhabitants of the lands lived in caves along the river bank, eventually forming communities and small villages on fortified hilltops. Local life was centered around pastoralism and small-scale crafts. The rugged countryside and river bluffs sheltered the population from outside threats, but the relative isolation of the river valley slowed the spread of commerce and exchange. Organized agriculture spread to Aoiz later than other parts of Navarre, arriving in the 1st century BCE.

During the era of Roman Rule over Spain (1st-4th Century AD), the lands near the future Aoiz remained less romanized than other neighboring regions of Navarre. By the 4th Century AD, agriculture was consolidated along Roman lines in the style of Latifundium and became more efficient, and numerous small villages were formed to service these large estates, including Aoiz. When the Roman Empire began to slip into decline, the area around Aoiz was on the periphery of imperial control but remained prosperous. While much of Hispania was invaded by the Vandals, Suevi, and Alans, the Irati river valley saw an entrenchment of the local Basque and proto-Navarro cultures, whose influence remained strong during Visigothic and Frankish incursions into Hispania in the 8th century and Muslim incursions in the 9th.

=== Kingdom of Navarre ===
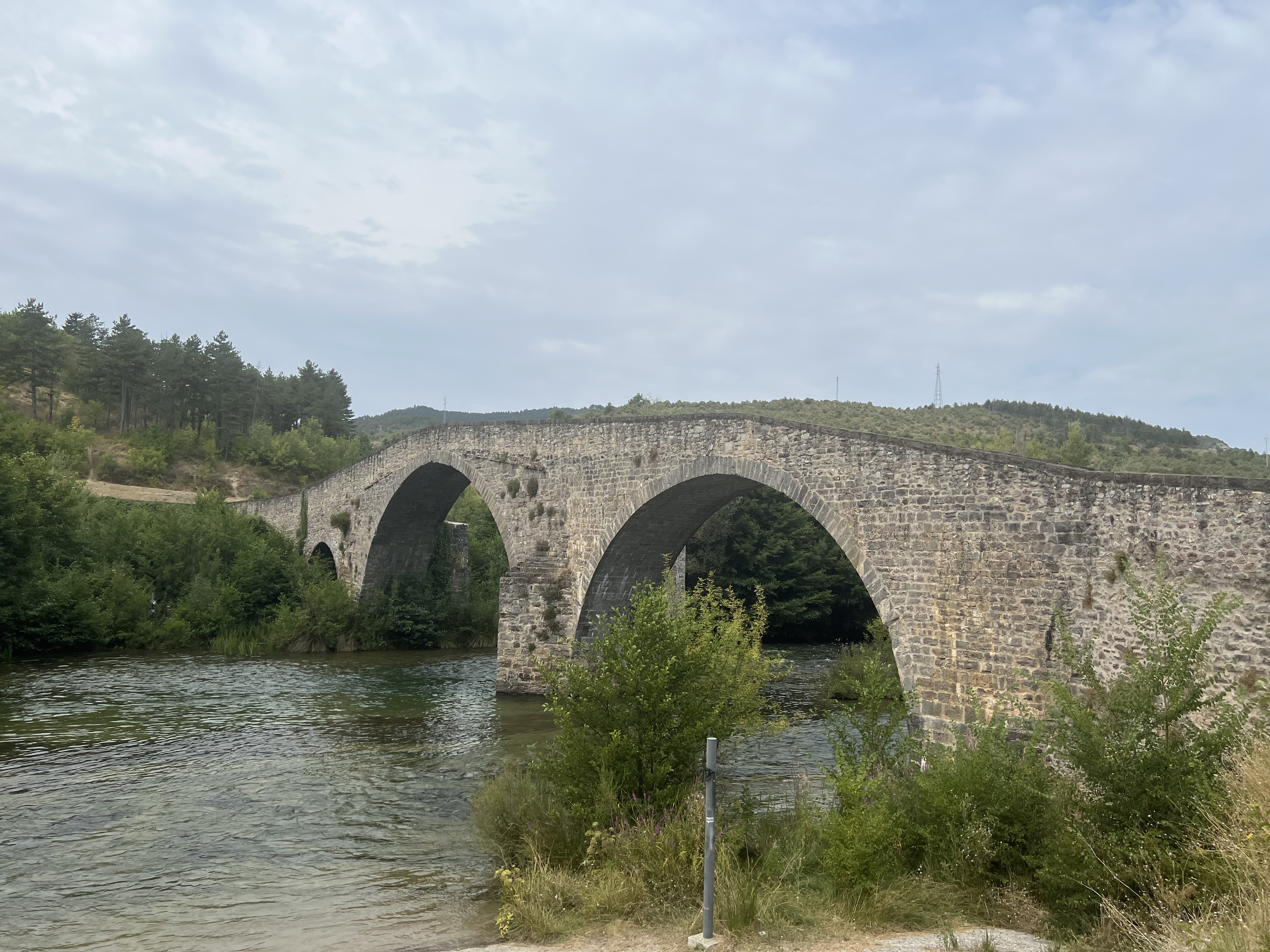
The stone bridge (Puente de Auzola) over the river Irati at Aoiz. Initially built during the High Middle Ages, the bridge has been rebuilt several times over the centuries.

When the Kingdom of Navarre was founded in 824, the village of Aoiz lay between two strongholds of the kingdom, the capital of Pamplona and the fortified town of Sangüesa. Both vied for influence over Aoiz, until Sangüesa went into decline and Pamplona gained definitive influence over the kingdom. The village prospered for almost a century until 924, when an Umayyad army under the command of Abd al-Rahman III invaded the valley, devastating the region before marching north to sack Pamplona.

The region experienced a revival in the 9th and 10th centuries, as Carolingian influence spread in Navarre. Economic and social recovery led to the establishment of many small-scale monasteries, hermitages, and rural churches, including the monastery of San Salvador de Zalurribar, which became the first religious center in Aoiz. The town continued to grow in the 11th and 12th centuries, including the construction of the town's famous bridge and a Romanesque church. The kings of Navarre divided the kingdom into six districts (the Merindad system) for better defense and administration; under this system, Aoiz was grouped under the Merindad of Sangüesa.

Document from 1531 depicting Aoiz, a bridge, and the splitting of the Irati river. Also pictured are the villages of Villaveta and Aos, both located downstream from Aoiz.

Navarre entered a period of instability in the 13th century, as political divides and growing French, Aragonese, and Castilian influence destabilized the region. Aoiz stayed out of the War of the Two Pedros between Castile and Aragon by paying an exemption, but was involved in a disastrous Navarrese conflict against Castile in which the town was burned by Castilian troops, with only the town church's tower surviving. Despite the destruction of the town, the area was rebuilt during the subsequent decades; Aoiz was visited by Charles II of Navarre and his successor Charles III, both of whom granted special tax exemptions and privileges to the town in the 1380s. The latter Charles in particular was a benefactor of the town, declaring all Agoiskos free from serfage and labor obligations, and went as far as to have a local vintner provide wine for his court. The town benefitted from the relative peace and the economy was fueled by increases in the wine, cattle and grain trades. In addition to local Basques and Navarros, a small number of foreign merchants, mostly of Frankish descent, also lived in the town.

Aoiz, along with the entirety of the Irati river valley, was struck by several waves of bubonic plague in the late 14th century, leaving large swathes of countryside depopulated. The economy collapsed, forcing the crown to offer tax relief to the town’s surviving inhabitants. The administrative dimensions of Aoiz grew during this time, as the town was granted control over nearby settlements that had been abandoned, but the population of Aoiz did not recover until the 1430s. The town rebuilt, however; work began on a new stone church on the bluffs above the river, communal mills were established to grind grain, and the town center was fortified.

In the 1440s, Aoiz became one of many fronts in a succession crisis between John of Aragon and his son, Charles of Vianna, whose struggle for the Navarrese throne often turned violent. Both political leaders visited Aoiz (Charles in 1442 and John in 1450) and the town was split between their respective supporters. When the simmering conflict devolved into open hostility during the Navarrese Civil War (1451–1455), Aoiz was the sole town in the Irati river valley to side with John, while the rest of the valley sided with Charles. John triumphed over his son during the conflict, but fighting between the supporters of John (the "Agramonts") and supporters of Charles' heirs (the "Beaumonts") continued for decades. The fighting continued until the reign of Francis Phoebus, whose mother and regent Madeleine of Valois arranged for peace negotiations between the Agramonts and Beaumonts in 1479. Leaders of the factions gathered on the outskirts of Aoiz at a small hermitage and—in a gesture of peace—purportedly stuck their swords into the earth. In gratitude for the peace, the regent granted Aoiz the honorific of "Buena Villa" and a seat in the cortes of Navarre, in addition to a number of other royal privileges. In 1495, co-monarchs John and Catherine of Navarre granted Aoiz the right to display a coat of arms commemorating the peace accord, and as such the town adopted its present coat of arms - a gold crown on a red field above two downward facing swords.

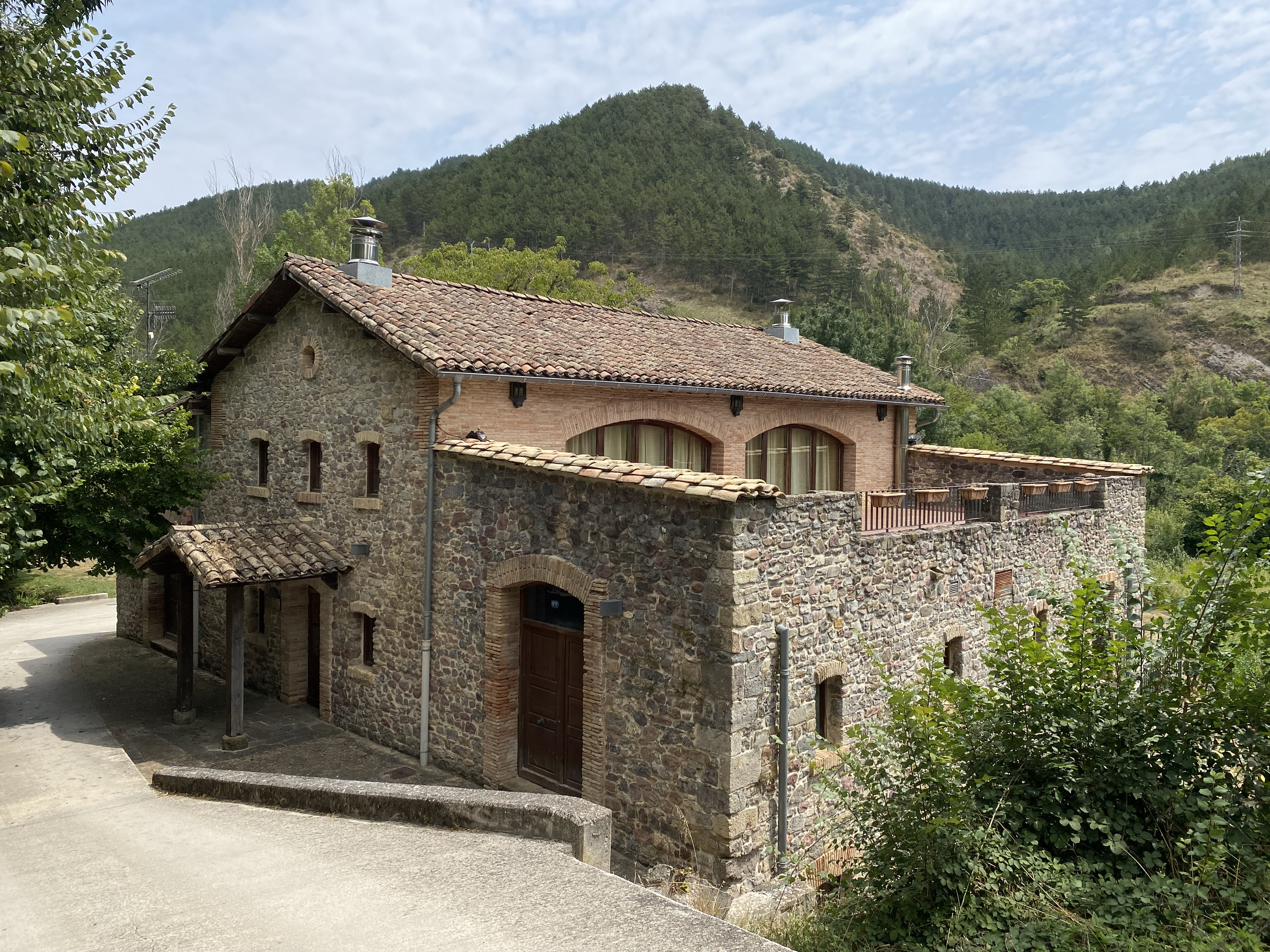
Stone mill in Aoiz, built on the site of an older fulling mill. From the 16th to the early 20th century, Aoiz was a center of cloth manufacturing in the Irati river valley.

=== Spanish Aoiz ===
In 1512, Ferdinand II of Aragon invaded Navarre and expelled John and Catherine. The deposed monarchs fled to France and returned with a large army, but were unable to retake Pamplona before the winter set in. While retreating back to France, a potion of the Navarrese army was intercepted and routed in the fields around Aoiz in December 1512. Ferdinand of Aragon died in 1516 and his successor, Charles V, assumed the crowns of Castile, Aragon, and Navarre, thus forming the basis of a unified Spain. Charles kept the legal structure of the old kingdom of Navarre intact, and under the new union Aoiz maintained the majority of its rights and privileges.

Aoiz benefited from the stabilized political climate in the mid 16th century. The town maintained its right to sit in on the cortes of Navarre and sent delates to represent the interests of the community. The economy continued to grow, with forestry, metalworking, and crafts becoming more important. Expanded access to raw materials led to the formation of several guilds in the town, including a guild of shoemakers, tailors, and one of weavers (which eventually split into two guilds, one of linen weavers and a second for wool-workers, pelaires). Many residents of Aoiz also joined cofradías, religious organizations that often included members of the same trade and their families. The guilds gained significant political power in the town and many members became landowners.

Despite the importance and variety of its crafts, Aoiz remained a small town with a strong rural character. Rural peasants from the surrounding valleys brought their livestock and produce to Aoiz's market (permitted by royal decree to be held on the first Thursday of every month, and a fair during celebrations of San Miguel), and these goods supported the large artisan community. The medieval town center nevertheless likely never exceeded 500 people.

The new prosperity of Aoiz led to commensurate improvements in town life; many wealthier families in Aoiz built renaissance-style homes using polished ashlar stonework, and the town notables commissioned a grand altarpiece in the church by Navarrese sculptor Juan de Anchieta. Woodworking, masonry, and silversmithing all thrived under church and private patronage. This period of growth ended in the 1570s, as Spain was struck by a series of crises; war between Spain and the protestant powers of Europe, an outbreak of influenza in Navarre, rampant currency inflation (the "Price Revolution", or Revolución de los precios) and eventually the defaulting of the Spanish crown on its loans. The population of the town remained stagnant until 1630.

=== Early modern era ===
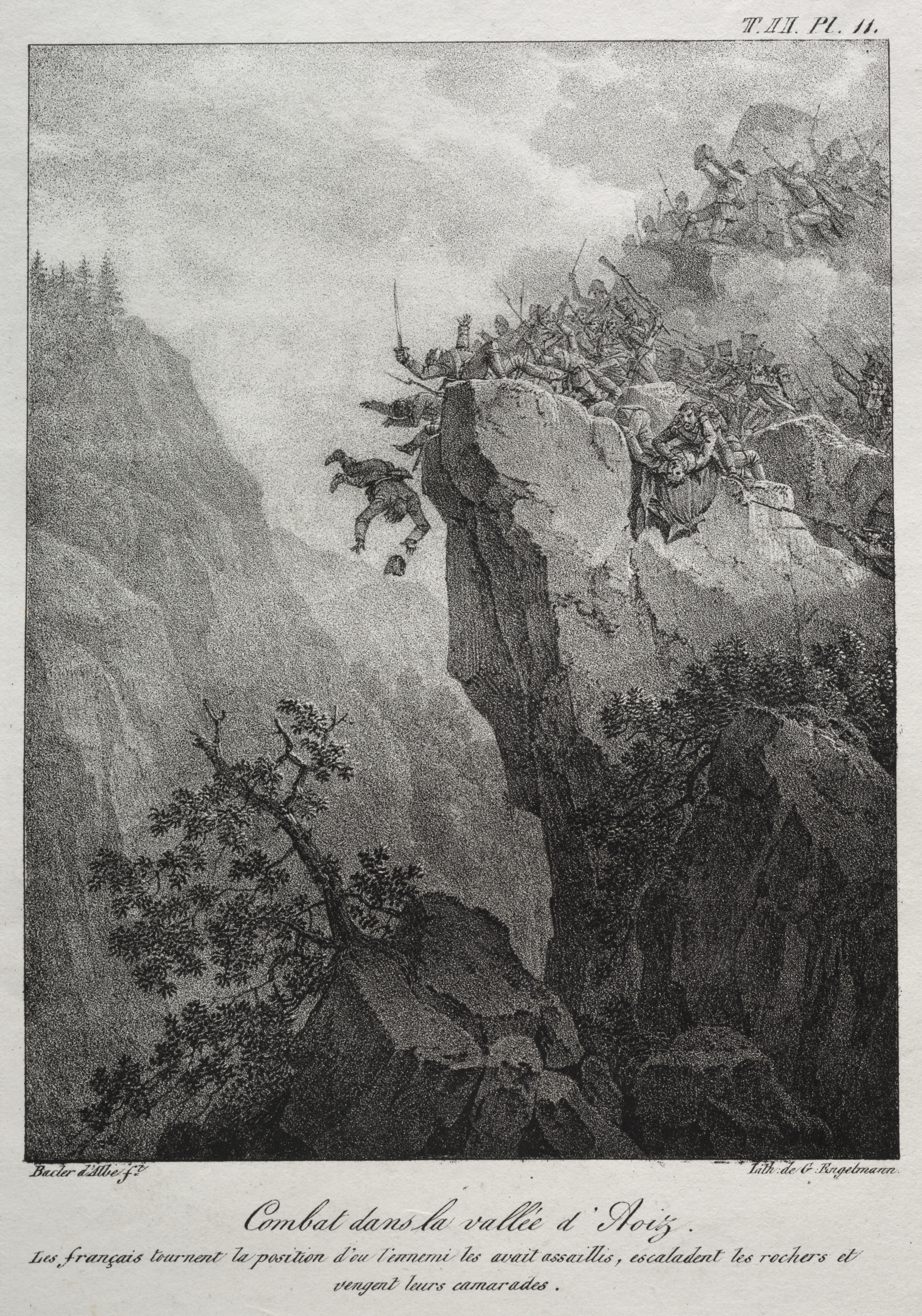
Lithograph depicting the fighting in the Aoiz valley during the Spanish War of Independence between 1808 and 1813. Produced by French military surveyor Louis Albert Guislain Bacler d'Albe.

The town began growing again in the mid 17th century, spurred by economic growth. Aoiz reached its peak pre-industrial population in 1680, before gradually declining for the next century. The pelaires guild became even more powerful in the town, occupying many positions in the government, and Aoiz became known for producing a particular type of dyed wool cloth, the roncal. Several scions of Aoiz families served the Spanish Empire in Naples, Colombia and Peru, while other notables joined catholic mendicant orders. The region began to undergo the early stirrings of the industrial revolution in the mid-18th century, and numerous mills and manufactories sprouted up along the banks of the Irati. The town became a local hub for the production of paper, tanned hides, and flour. Massive demand for lumber (driven mostly by the Spanish navy's need for ships' masts) led to a flourishing of the lumber industry in Aoiz; members of the town organized work crews to ascend into the Pyrenean valleys and Irati Forest to cut trees. Crews would then bundle the logs into rafts (almadía) and float them down the river to Aoiz and other towns. The process was tricky on the low-standing Irati river, and the bridge at Aoiz had to be reinforced with angled masonry to deflect blows from logs. Logs were shipped overland to San Sebastian on the bay of Biscay and down the Aragón river to Tortosa.

War broke out between Spain and Revolutionary France in 1793, and Navarre again saw fighting between the two nations. Following a series of French victories in the War of the Pyrenees, Aoiz was occupied by the French in late 1794 and French soldiers looted the town. A peace treaty was signed in 1795, and Spain entered into an alliance with France against Great Britain in 1796, but the alliance soured; in 1808, a French army entered Spain, toppled the government and installed Joseph Bonaparte on the Spanish throne. Aoiz was again occupied by the French, who established a cannon foundry in the town. Unlike the invasion of 1794, the occupation of 1808 led to a wide-spread uprising against the French, including in the Irati river valley. Residents fled into the hills and forests to fight against French troops, using small units and ambushes to fight the "little war" (guerrilla) against the occupiers. The French retaliated with reprisals against the population. Several residents of Aoiz were executed by the French, some families were deported to France for use as forced laborers, and the town bridge was partially destroyed. The French were expelled from Spain by Anglo-Spanish forces in 1813, but the countryside was left bloodied and in disarray. The war accelerated the breakup of the Spanish empire, and the disjointed postwar government was prone to infighting.

Aoiz recovered from the occupation, but the economy remained poor for years. Many of the town's old guilds had declined by the turn of the 19th century and been dissolved by 1830. The town was created as the head of its own judiciary in 1820 and a municipal court was established in 1836. Aoiz was swept up in the turbulent Spanish politics of the mid 19th century, as Liberal and Conservative forces vied for control of the Spanish government. The town supported the conservative Carlist movement, concerned that the Liberal government in Madrid's reforms—while couched in the language of freedom and modernization—would erode the legal privileges Aoiz had enjoyed for centuries and curtail the town's economy. Aoiz supported the Carlist army during the First Carlist War and the area saw skirmishing between the Carlist and government forces. The conflict ended with the Convention of Vergara in 1839, but political tensions lingered. At the outbreak of the Third Carlist War in 1872, government troops pre-emptively occupied Aoiz and forcibly requisitioned supplies from the townspeople, causing much local resentment. Carlist troops established an artillery battery in the hills across the river from the town, occasionally opening fire on the government troops; factories and lumber stockpiles in Aoiz were burned. The government troops were forced to withdraw in 1875, but infighting among the Carlists led to the defeat of the movement the next year.

=== Modern era ===
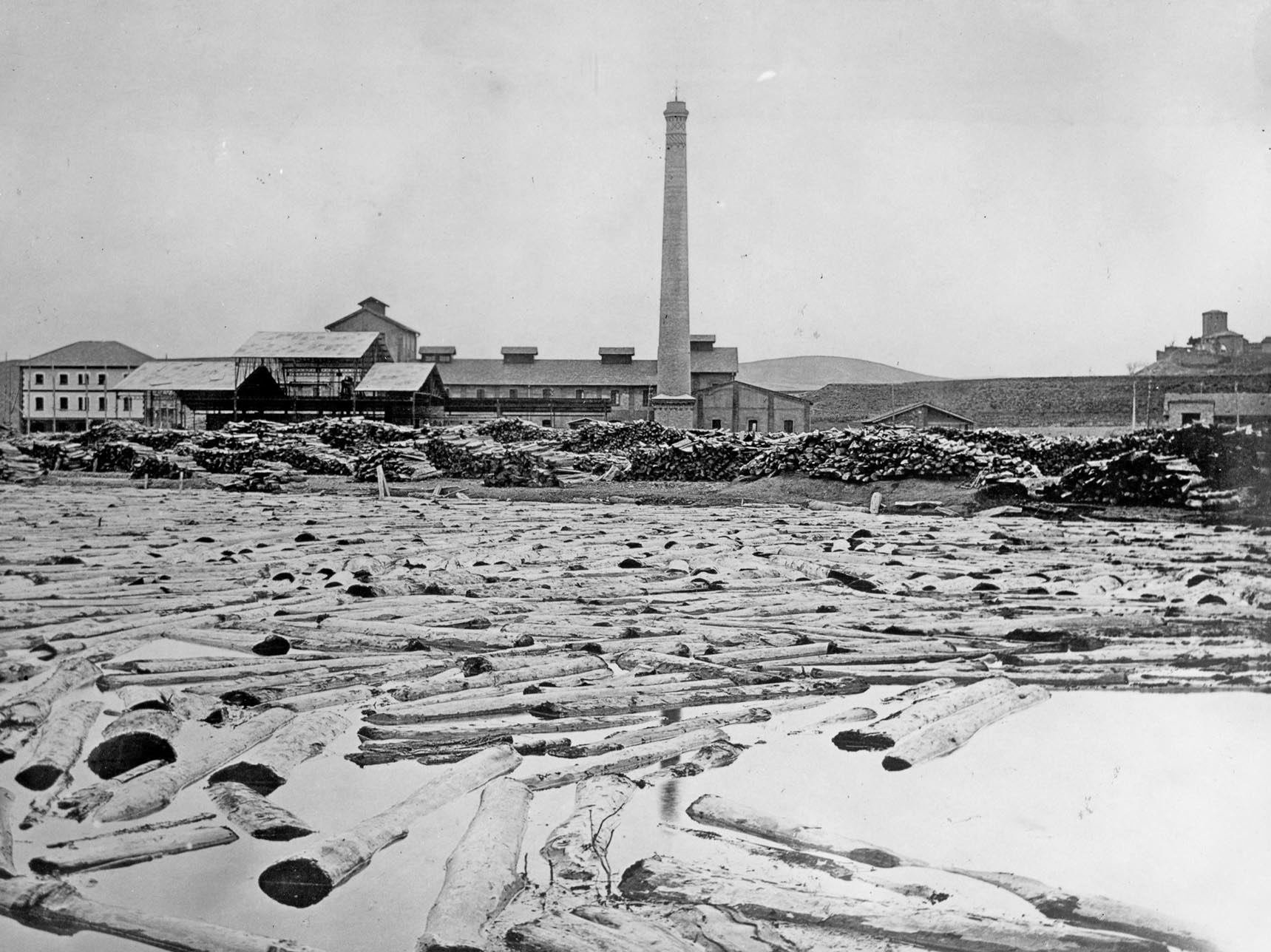
The Ekai sawmill and industrial complex, circa 1938. Logs felled in the foothills of the Pyrenees were floated down the Irati river to Aoiz for processing. The plant remained in operation until the 1990s.

Despite the disruptions of the mid 19th century, the town continued to develop through increased industrialization. The older landowning families of the town invested in new buildings along the Irati, benefiting from technologies being introduced to Navarre. Larger, family-owned factories filled the niche left by the decline of the old artisanal guilds; the old cloth industry of the Aoiz survived and the lumber industry grew larger, naval demands being replaced by orders for beechwood staves, barrels, and shipping boxes. Hydroelectric dams were built along the Irati to provide power to local industry. The growth of Aoiz into an industrial town led to an increase in the population, but political and social conflicts also led to many native Agoiskos emigrating to Latin America and the United States.

In 1904, a collection of investors from Pamplona and Aoiz formed El Irati S.A. ("Sociedad El Irati"), a lumber, electricity, and rail consortium. The company began work on a rail line from Pamplona to Sanguesa via Aoiz, which was completed in 1911. The rail line operated until 1955 and was the first electrified rail in Spain. Irati S.A. built a large sawmill in Ekai (a small hamlet two kilometers south of Aoiz) to produce charcoal and chemical products via dry distillation, becoming a major employer in the area. In 1912, the town was part of an air race commemorating the 800th anniversary of the Battle of Las Navas de Tolosa. The early wood monoplanes were well-received when they flew over Aoiz on their flight from Sanguesa to Pamplona. By the early 1930s the town had around 1500 inhabitants.

During the 1930s, Aoiz was gripped by the same political turmoil that wracked the rest of Spain. The town had a diverse political scene in 1932 - Liberals, Republicans, Carlists, and Basque nationalists all held positions of power - but Agoiskos tended towards the conservative. The Republicans were voted into office in 1932, while Conservatives won the vote in 1936.

When the Spanish coup of July 1936 spiraled into the Spanish Civil War, almost all of Navarre, including Aoiz, sided with the Nationalist Spanish forces against the Republican forces in Madrid. Aoiz was removed from the front lines of the war, but was not spared the political bloodletting of the civil war years. Nationalist militias detained Agoizkos affiliated with the Popular Front, Republican and socialist parties; prominent local socialists and the former Republican mayor were shot, and their families were subjected to intimidation. Even after the Nationalist government assumed power in the town, squabbling broke out among ardently conservative Carlists and the fascist Falangists, as the two parties grappled for political influence. The four-year civil war and political turmoil led to an emptying of the town, as many young men fled to the countryside or into France. Other Agoiskos supported the nationalist cause with enthusiasm. Men from Aoiz were recruited into the Nationalist forces, with some being forcibly conscripted. A handful defected to the republican cause or remained abroad.

The civil war left the Spanish economy in ruins, even in relatively stable Navarre; the outbreak of World War II quashed attempts at a fast reconstruction, and the defeat of the fascist powers of Europe left Falangist Spain a diplomatic pariah. The population of Aoiz grew slowly and remained below pre-war levels, and industry struggled in the town. The situation improved with the signing of the Pact of Madrid in 1953, which renewed Spanish ties with the United States, and the recovery of the war-ravaged economies of Western Europe in the late 1950s.

Aoiz began to grow into the 1960s, as people migrated to the town from other, more remote settlements in search of opportunity. Infrastructure improved, and the economy of Navarre expanded—an appendage of the “Spanish Miracle”. In Aoiz, the early 1960s also saw the decline of Irati S.A. and the lumber industry. With the end of Francoist Spain and the transition of Spain into a democracy in the 1970s, many political groups that had been suppressed under Francoism began to re-assert themselves, and Aoiz began to experience a new, democratic pluralism.

Work began on a gravity dam north of town in the mid 1980s. The intent of the project was to regulate the flow of the Irati river and to create a freshwater reservoir. Construction of the dam was heavily debated in Navarre, as the flooding of the reservoir would destroy nature preserves and several small villages. The dam was completed and the reservoir, the Embalse de Itoiz, was filled in 2003. The water collected is used to supply drinking water to Pamplona and for agricultural and industrials uses.

=== Present day ===
Aoiz continues to grow into the mid-2020s, the population having almost doubled since the year 2000s. The economy is driven by construction, manufacturing, and agriculture.

== Culture ==
Aoiz has a storied and dynamic culture, the product of centuries of adaption and exchange. Basque, Aragonese, Castilian, and Navarro culture all have an impact on the town. Aoiz, like many other towns in the region, has seen demographic shifts in its history; established families in Aoiz often had younger members leave for the cities or overseas, while rural families from the Pyrenees migrated into town in search of opportunity. As such, thousands of families have heritage originating in Aoiz.

Several organizations promote cultural learning in Aoiz. The Asociación Bilaketa promotes cultural and artistic activities in Aoiz, and hosts annual artistic and poetry contests. The town has a cultural center, built in 2004, that hosts the local public library. The Aoiz History Association (HIDEA) promotes the history of the town and works to restore historical structures. In 2026 HIDEA worked to install a new sculpture at the Ermita San Roman, the small hermitage where the peace negotiations of 1479 were held.

A type of custard pie, Costrada de Aoiz, is famous in Navarre.

== Climate ==
Aoiz has a temperate Oceanic climate. Summers are temperate to hot, and winters are mild and humid. Harsher winter weather can occasionally form in the Pyrenees mountains and drift into the Irati river valley.

Climate data for Aoiz, Navarra (1993–2020)
Month	Jan	Feb	Mar	Apr	May	Jun	Jul	Aug	Sep	Oct	Nov	Dec	Year
Record high °F (°C)	63.5 (17.5)	71.6 (22.0)	77.0 (25.0)	84.2 (29.0)	95.0 (35.0)	104.0 (40.0)	104.0 (40.0)	104.0 (40.0)	96.8 (36.0)	86.0 (30.0)	73.4 (23.0)	62.6 (17.0)	104.0 (40.0)
Mean daily maximum °F (°C)	48.0 (8.9)	50.9 (10.5)	57.7 (14.3)	62.1 (16.7)	69.6 (20.9)	78.4 (25.8)	83.3 (28.5)	83.5 (28.6)	75.2 (24.0)	66.4 (19.1)	54.1 (12.3)	48.4 (9.1)	64.8 (18.2)
Daily mean °F (°C)	36.0 (2.2)	43.0 (6.1)	48.6 (9.2)	52.7 (11.5)	59.4 (15.2)	67.1 (19.5)	71.2 (21.8)	71.4 (21.9)	64.2 (17.9)	57.2 (14.0)	47.3 (8.5)	41.7 (5.4)	55.4 (13.0)
Mean daily minimum °F (°C)	34.7 (1.5)	35.1 (1.7)	39.4 (4.1)	43.3 (6.3)	49.1 (9.5)	55.6 (13.1)	59.4 (15.2)	59.5 (15.3)	53.4 (11.9)	48.0 (8.9)	40.5 (4.7)	35.2 (1.8)	46.0 (7.8)
Record low °F (°C)	25 (−4)	26.4 (−3.1)	29.3 (−1.5)	33.4 (0.8)	37.9 (3.3)	45.9 (7.7)	50.4 (10.2)	50.2 (10.1)	43.7 (6.5)	36.5 (2.5)	28.8 (−1.8)	24.8 (−4.0)	24.8 (−4.0)
Average precipitation inches (mm)	3.99 (101.3)	3.44 (87.3)	3.30 (83.7)	3.19 (81.1)	2.76 (70.1)	2.14 (54.3)	1.55 (39.4)	1.28 (32.4)	2.59 (65.7)	3.10 (78.7)	4.09 (103.9)	3.59 (91.1)	35.00 (888.9)
Average snowfall inches (cm)	0 (0)	0 (0)	0 (0)	0.0 (0.0)	0.0 (0.0)	0.0 (0.0)	0.0 (0.0)	0.0 (0.0)	0.0 (0.0)	0.0 (0.0)	0.0 (0.0)	0 (0)	0.0 (0.0)
Average precipitation days (≥ 1 mm)	9.2	7.2	9.4	9.7	12.8	10.5	9.8	9.7	8.3	8.9	8.5	9.0	113.0
Average snowy days	0.0	0.0	0.0	0.0	0.0	0.0	0.0	0.0	0.0	0.0	0.0	0.0	0.0
Source: Nafarroako meteorologia eta klimatologia

== See also ==
- Aoiz-Agoitz in the Great Encyclopedia of Navrra
