= Romualdo de Toledo y Robles =

Spanish politician (1895–1974)

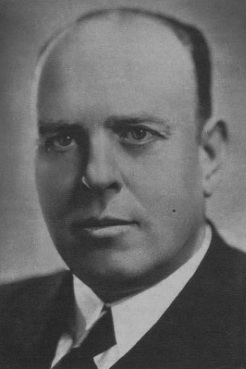
- Born: Tiburcio Toledo Robles; 1895; Molina de Aragón, Spain
- Died: 1974 (aged 78–79); Madrid, Spain
- Occupation: civil servant
- Known for: politician, education official
- Political party: Patriotic Union (Spain), Carlism, FET y de las JONS

Tiburcio Romualdo de Toledo y Robles (1895–1974) was a Spanish politician, civil servant and education theorist. He is known mostly as the high official of Ministerio de Educación Nacional and head of the primary education system in 1937–1951. His political allegiances changed; in the 1920s member of the primoderiverista Unión Patriótica, in the 1930s he was an active Carlist but then got fully aligned with the Franco regime. In 1933–1936 he was deputy to the republican Cortes, and in 1943–1958 he served in the Francoist parliament, Cortes Españolas. Between 1937 and 1958 he was member of the Falange Española Tradicionalista executive, Consejo Nacional. In 1925–1930 de Toledo served as councilor in the Madrid ayuntamiento, since 1929 as teniente de alcalde; in the town hall he was largely responsible for education-related issues. Since 1939 until death he was in executive board of the news agency EFE.

== Family and youth ==
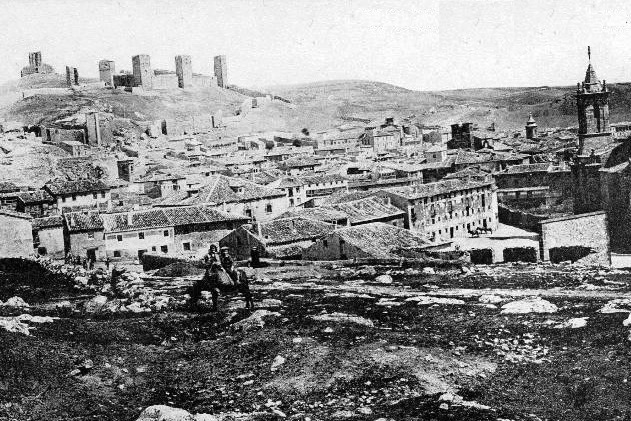
Molina de Aragón, early 20th c.

The surname of Toledo/de Toledo is among the most popular in Spain; it was recorded already in the early medieval era. However, it is not clear what branch Romualdo descended from and there is close to nothing known about his ancestors. His father, Eduardo Toledo, held a small estate in Molina de Aragón, in the province of Guadalajara. None of the sources consulted provides information when he married Josefa Robles Arnal, a girl from the same town. The couple settled at the Eduardo's possessions. It is not clear how many children they had, yet apart from Romualdo they had at least one more son, Pascual (who unlike his brother would not use the ennobled version of their surname and would appear and “Pascual Toledo Robles”) and at least one daughter, Maria de los Dolores. Both Eduardo and Josefa perished during the deadly influenza epidemic, known as Spanish flu, in 1914. On behalf of the children, the estate was administered by their uncle Pascual.

At the age of 11 Romualdo – at the time known rather by his first name Tiburcio – left the family home and in 1906 he became a boarder in Instituto General y Técnico in Guadalajara. During the following years of 1907 and 1908 he excelled as a student; in 1909 he opted for bachillerato in algebra and trigonometry, the title which he obtained in 1911. In 1912 he moved to Zaragoza to commence university studies at Facultad de Ciencias, the faculty dedicated mostly to physics and chemistry. He completed the curriculum and in 1916 he graduated as doctor de ciencias exactas. Subject to military service, he formed part of “reemplazo de 1916” – though unclear whether he actually served – and in 1920 passed to reserve in Tropas de Sanidad Militar. In the early 1920s he moved to Madrid and was employed as auxiliar de meteorología in Observatorio de Madrid; first noted at this post in 1922, he would hold the job for some 10 years to come.

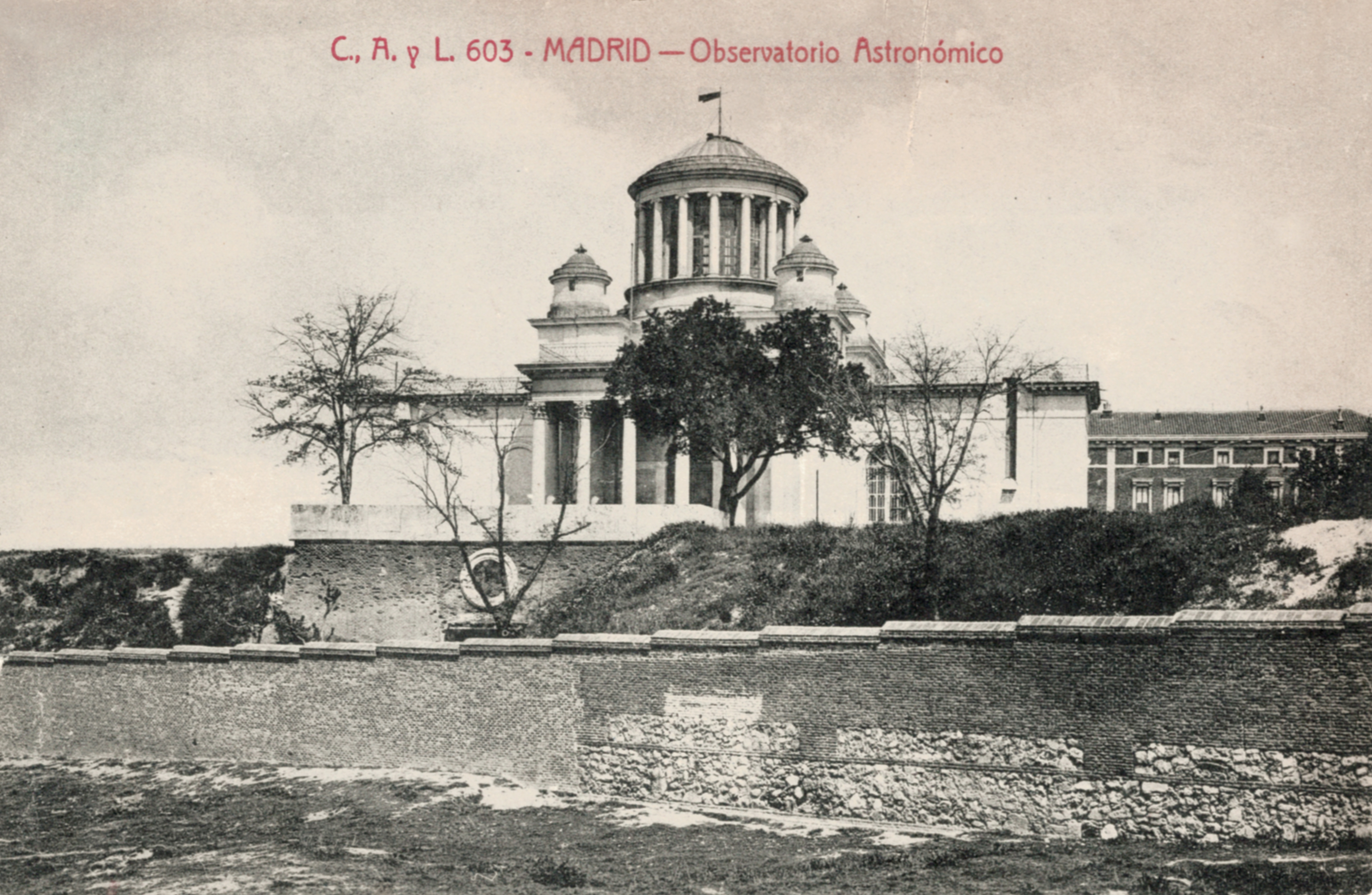
Observatorio de Madrid

Prior to 1926 de Toledo married Remigia del Castillo Asensio (1895–1935); little is known about her except that she was related to Teruel. The couple had 4 children, born between the mid-1920s and the mid-1930s. Remigia died prematurely in February 1935; in October 1935 the widower remarried with Pilar Sanz Beneded (died 1992). His second wife descended from a well-established Zaragoza family; her father was an entrepreneur and the retail business he started was later developed into a large-scale enterprise. In the marriage with Pilar de Toledo had further 3 children. None of his descendants would become a widely known personality, yet Romualdo de Toledo Sanz gained some recognition as in the 1970s and the 1980s he ascended to high management positions in the publishing house Grupo 16. Among more distant relatives his maternal cousin José María Araúz de Robles was a politician and bull-breeder, while his nephew-in-law Angel Sanz Briz became known for saving Hungarian Jews in 1944–1945.

== Dictadura: councilor and education official (1925–1930) ==
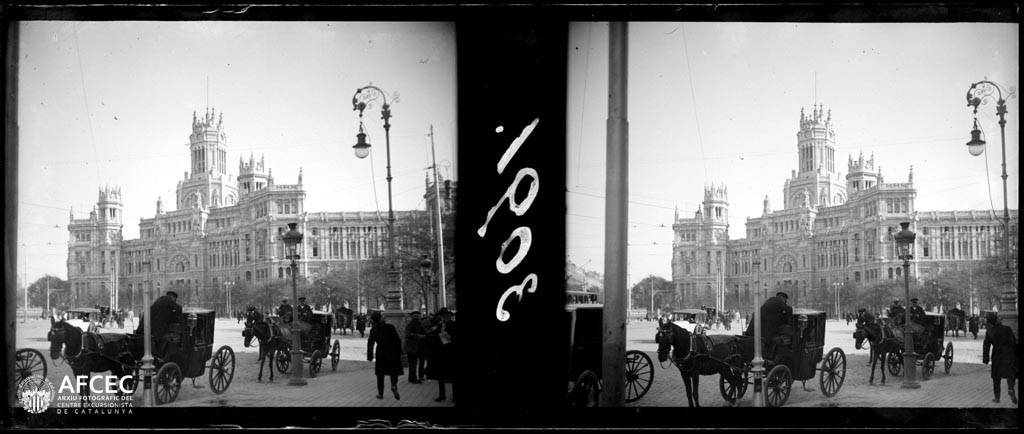
Madrid town hall, mid-1920s

Political preferences of de Toledo's ancestors are unknown; there is neither any data available on his public activities in the academic period. First information on his political endeavors is related to the mid-1920s; during the early period of Primo de Rivera dictatorship he joined the Madrid structures of the newly created state party, Unión Patriotica. He was an active member, and in 1925 as one of 10 vocales he entered Junta Provincial of the organisation. The same year de Toledo as one of 64 alternate councilors entered the Madrid town hall, in the dictatorship era not elected but appointed by the civil governor. In 1927 he became the interim councilor in the ayuntamiento and assumed some administrative duties, e.g. in 1928 dealing with local calamities. In 1929 the council elected him as one of 10 deputy mayors; de Toledo was responsible for the Universidad district. He was noted as active on numerous fields, from public transport to quality of bread to organizing fiestas veraniegas.

Parallel to his duties in the Madrid town hall, de Toledo commenced career in central administration. In 1926 he was nominated secretario auxiliar in Ministerio de Instrucción Pública and entered some internal committees within the ministry. He retained this role during following years and assumed positions in various dependent bodies, like Consejo Superior del Patronato de la Federación de Mutualidades Escolares. He was noted conferencing on “problema escolar”, writing articles, and discussing issues like financing teachers by large municipalities or city councils co-financing certain types of schools. In the late 1920s his activities in local administration and education converged, as he became delegado de enseñanza in the ayuntamiento, referred to as “paladín de la instrucción pública en nuestro activo Municipio”.

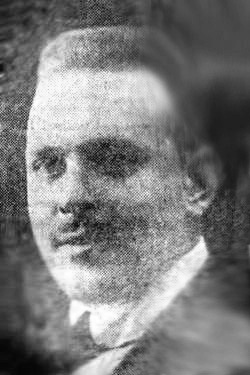
in 1927

In the late 1920s de Toledo was gradually gaining some prestige. In 1928 he was nominated to Gran Cruz del Mérito Civil. He was celebrated especially in his native Molina, where in 1928 he entered the commission which first prepared the visit of Alfonso XIII and then greeted the king during his brief visit to the town. He also lobbied for construction of Calatayud – Molina – Cuenca railway line, the project which has never materialized, and remained engaged in some works on regulation of the water regime, carried out by Ministerio de Fomento. He also kept climbing the party ladder, and in 1930 became Unión Patriotica delegate for the Guadalajara province. Throughout the late 1920s he remained employed by the Madrid Observatorio and even obtained the prize, awarded to meritorious auxiliares de Meteorología. At the time the press started to refer to him as Romualdo rather than Tiburcio. Also, though in official documents he was noted as “Tiburcio Romualdo Toledo Robles”, increasingly frequently in newspapers he was listed as “de Toledo y Robles”.

== Republic: SADEL director and Cortes deputy (1930–1936) ==
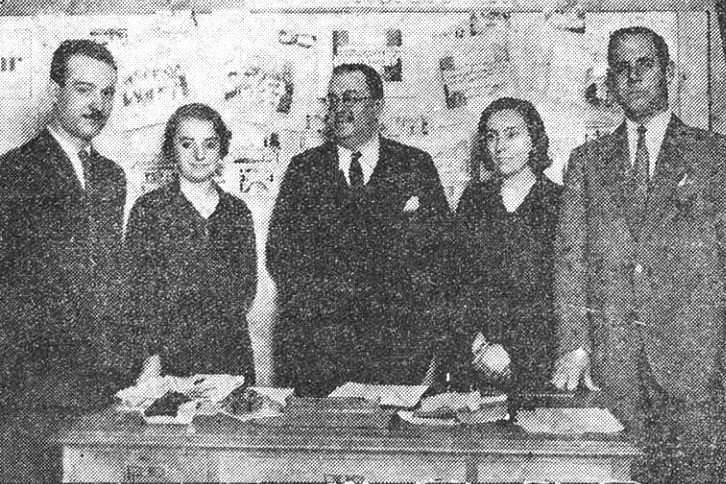
among staff of Asociación de Padres de Familia, 1933 (center)

In 1930 de Toledo lost his seat in the ayuntamiento. In 1931 he was running from the Congreso district as a candidate of Unión Monárquica Nacional, yet failed. Since then he focused on activity in numerous Catholic organizations, noted in Acción Católica, Confederación Nacional de Familiares y Amigos de los Religiosos, and Asociación Católica de Padres de Familia. His activity was mostly about the education system, be it lectures or articles. In 1933 de Toledo co-founded SADEL, Sociedad Anonima de Ensañanza Libre; formally a commercial company, its objective was to confront secular legislation and provide institutional framework for Catholic schools. Initially he entered the executive, yet he shortly rose to CEO. SADEL proved a success; in the mid-1930s there were 16,318 students registered in its network.

Already during his service in the ayuntamiento de Toledo approached the Traditionalists, and these bonds strengthened. In early 1933 he was for the first time mentioned by the Carlist mouthpiece, El Siglo Futuro, later to appear frequently on its pages as an education pundit. He started to speak on schooling system during Carlist rallies, e.g. in Segovia or in Valencia. There is no confirmation that he formally joined Comunión Tradicionalista, though the party fielded him as candidate in the 1933 elections. Running in the district of Madrid province he appeared as “agricultor” within the broad right-wing alliance. With 71,463 votes de Toledo emerged triumphant; in the chamber he joined the Carlist minority and became its secretary. Among cohorts of lawyers, academics and journalists, he was one of only two MPs “licenciados in ciencias”.

De Toledo was an active parliamentarian; most of his activity revolved around education. First steps were aimed at derogating secular legislation; later he worked on new laws, be it in comisión de instrucción pública, comisión de presupuestos, plenary sessions or co-signing proposals of new laws. In 1935 he demanded investigation as to teachers involved in the Asturias revolution. However, he voiced also in issues like agriculture and lobbied for investments in Molina, be it roads or telephones. He kept conferencing, giving lectures at various opportunities across Spain; in Covadonga he co-launched a project dubbed "Reconquista de Enseñanza". At the time he no longer worked in meteo services.

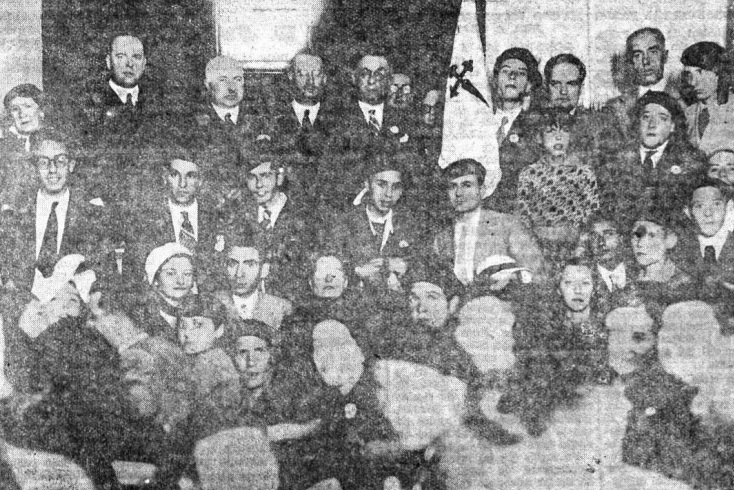
co-opening Carlist circulo in Murcia, 1935 (back row, center)

Active within Traditionalist structures, he kept opening new círculos and took part in propaganda tours, be it in Aragón or Cantabria. Politically he joined the Carlist faction which supported a monarchist alliance with the Alfonsists, and engaged in what emerged as the National Bloc. In the 1936 elections he was supposed to run on a joint Candidatura Contrarrevolucionaria ticket from Logroño and was allegedly confirmed by Gil-Robles, but following internal squabbles within the local Riojan alliance he was eventually left out and decided to run on his own. During the campaign he declared that the republic was “irreformable” and had no future. As elections turned out to be chiefly a confrontation between Frente Popular and CEDA-led alliances, all independent candidates were trashed; with merely 9,442 votes gathered de Toledo failed.

== Early war: in hiding and in officialdom (1936–1937) ==
Carlist standard

No source provides information whether de Toledo was engaged in anti-Republican Carlist conspiracy or whether he was even aware of it. In the early summer he remained in Madrid, and on July 14 he attended the funeral of Calvo Sotelo. However, 4 days later, at the moment of the July 1936 coup, de Toledo was already on vacation in the small Gipuzkoan spa of Cestona, where he holidayed together with another Traditionalist politician, Joaquín Beunza. The latter was soon detained by the Anarchist militia, and de Toledo was warned that he might soon follow suit. According to his own account there was a civil governor who bothered to Cestona to get him arrested, yet at the time he was already fleeing in a train westwards. He settled in Santander, unclear whether under false identity or incognito and whether single or accompanied by the family. De Toledo spent 5 months in the Cantabrian capital. It is neither known how he made it to the Nationalist zone; in June 1937, shortly after the fall of Biscay, he appeared in San Sebastián, allegedly “tras grandes peligros y persecuciones”. As he was believed to have fallen victim of Republican repression, his re-appearance was sort of a media scoop. Numerous newspapers issued in the Nationalist zone published his description of Republican-held Santander, though all accounts were singularly uninformative as to details of his personal lot.

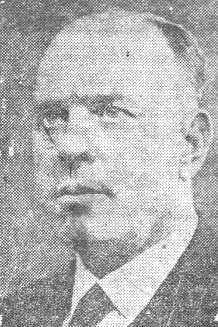
late 1930s

One scholar claims that when back in October 1936 Franco formed his quasi-government, Junta Técnica del Estado, de Toledo was, along with Joaquín Bau, one of the “more ‘collaborationist’ Carlists” who headed its departments, namely this of education. Also some other historians confirm this claim, but the source referred in these works does not. The first sourced information on his entry into Junta Técnica is from late July 1937, around a month after his appearance in the Nationalist zone; he was nominated “consejero de la Comisión de Cultura” in Comisión de Cultura y Ensañanza, sort of quasi-ministry of education, at the time headed by José María Pemán. Almost immediately de Toledo started publishing various articles on education, repeated in numerous press titles; the first one was printed in August 1937. It is not clear whether he resumed activity within Carlism, especially that at the time Comunión Tradicionalista was formally amalgamated into Falange Española Tradicionalista. None of numerous works on wartime Carlism mentions him as taking part in party operations, and specifically whether he supported or opposed the unification. In October 1937 Franco decided to appoint members of Consejo Nacional, the FET executive supposed to advise the caudillo. In the nomination decree among 50 appointees de Toledo was listed on position 49. He was among 11 Carlists nominated (according to other source among 12 Carlists).

== Early Francoism: Head of Primary Education (1938–1951) ==
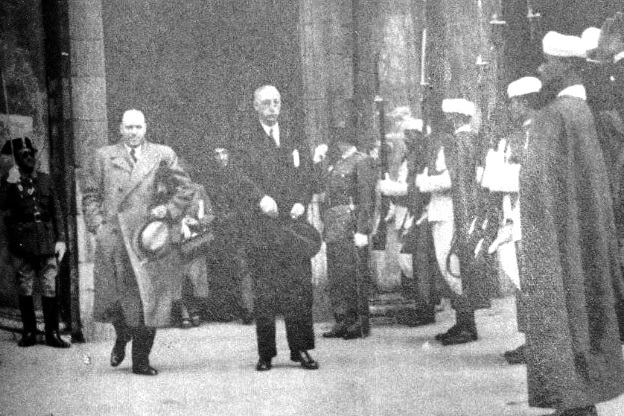
with Rodezno, leaving FET Consejo Nacional, 1939

In February 1938 de Toledo was nominated "subsecretario de primera enseñanza" within the ministry of education, headed by Pedro Sainz Rodríguez in the first regular Nationalist government. In March his position was renamed to "Jefe del Servicio Nacional de Primera Enseñanza". His immediate tasks were purging and re-constructing the teacher corps, forming the new curriculum, and work on the future primary education law. According to some scholars, with Sainz and José Ibañez Martín he was among 3 key people in the ministry. At the same time he became also "asesor in cuestiones educativas" within Auxilio Social. Also in 1938 he formed part of a commission, tasked with "demonstrar la illegalidad de los poderes actuantes en la República en 18 julio de 1936". Moreover, de Toledo was among “consejeros fundadores” of the semi-official news agency EFE, and in January 1939 he was noted as consejero de la agencia.

In August 1939 Saenz Rodríguez had to go; the ministry of education was taken over by Ibáñez Martín. De Toledo was confirmed at his post, and together with Pemán (higher education) he headed two most important departments of the ministry. His official title changed from "Jefe del Servicio" to "Directór General de Primera Enseñanza". In September de Toledo was nominated to II. Consejo Nacional of FET, though the decree, which listed appointees according to what appeared as prestige, named him on position 77 out of 90 and among 13 Carlists in the body. In the early 1940s Don Javier viewed these who joined Francoist structures without formal approval as half-traitors, yet de Toledo was not listed among these (like Rodezno or Bilbao) whose re-admission to Comunión Tradicionalista was out-of-the-question. However, none of the sources consulted provides information that apart from personal relations he maintained any links to organized Carlist structures.

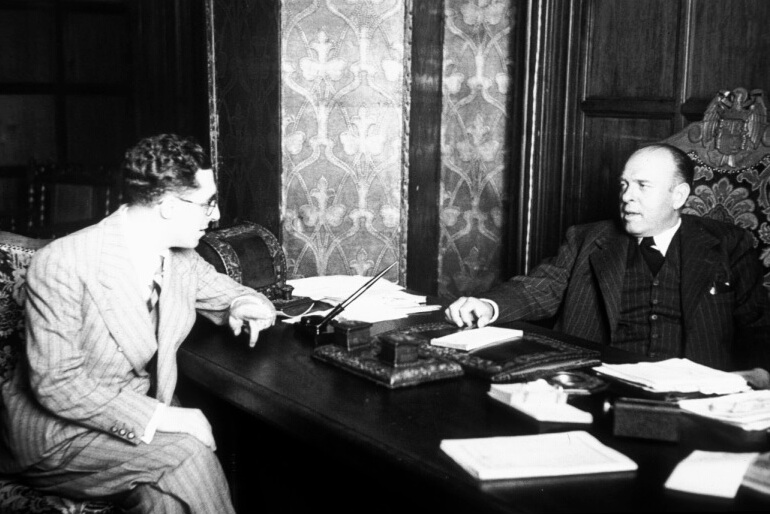
interviewed, mid-1940s

In 1942 de Toledo was confirmed as member of the Francoist elite when re-appointed on position 46 to III Consejo Nacional. When during first major redressing the system a quasi-parliament Cortes Españolas was set up, in 1943 by virtue of membership in Consejo de Toledo automatically became its member. This sequence of appointments continued; in 1946 he was nominated to IV. Consejo Nacional (position 22) which triggered nomination to the II. Cortes, while the 1949 nomination (position 21) guaranteed his seat in the III. Cortes. Throughout all these years he remained Director General de Primera Enseñanza and one of the most influential people shaping the education system. His term came to the end after 12 years, when in 1951 Ibáñez Martín ceased as minister of education and was replaced by Joaquín Ruiz-Giménez Cortés. It is not clear whether de Toledo was forced to resign or whether he decided to go himself; following a solemn farewell ceremony, he left the ministry in July 1951.

== Mid- and late Francoism: half-retiree and retiree (1952–1974) ==
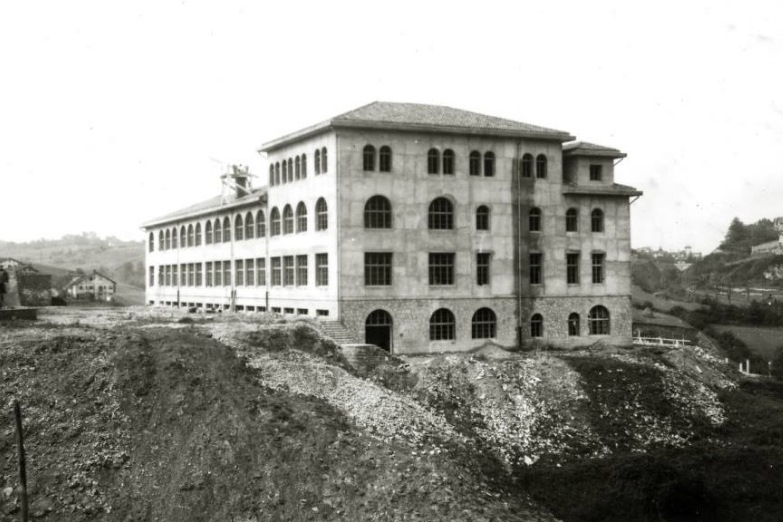
construction of Colegio Romualdo de Toledo, Altza

De Toledo's departure from the Ministry did not mean falling from grace. In 1952 he was nominated to VI. Consejo Nacional (for the first time the appointees were listed in alphabetical order), which translated to membership in the IV. Cortes, where he assumed presidency of commission working on the Spanish Guinea budget. In 1954 he was received by Franco. The year of 1955 brought nomination to VII. Consejo and V. Cortes. These bodies held little decision-making power, yet in the mid-1950s he was active in budgetary debates, e.g. in 1955 about housing and in 1956 about real estate rental. Historians note him particularly for the 1957 budgetary debate, when de Toledo was among chief opponents of the fiscal reform planned. He tried to block it with hundreds of amendments, launched a counter-proposal of prolonging the existing budget, claimed to defend “soberanía de las Cortes” and lambasted “persecución contra la gran propiedad”. At the time he owned 80 ha in Motilla del Palancar, but it is not clear whether this conditioned his Cortes stand.

Since 1937 de Toledo was not active in Carlist structures, though he cultivated personal relations with the collaborationist faction which sought rapprochement with the Alfonsists, led by conde Rodezno; the latter once noted “Romualdo, tan identificado conmigo”. De Toledo maintained these links also after death of Rodezno, e.g. when meeting Bilbao in 1955. In early 1957 de Toledo was for the first time listed as one of “personalidades del Tradicionalismo” who took part in the Martires de la Tradición celebrations, noted in this role also afterwards. Later the same year he joined a large group of Traditionalist politicians who openly rebelled against dynastic leadership of the claimant Don Javier. He appeared in Estoril and declared Don Juan the legitimate Carlist heir, yet there was no follow up on his part. It is not clear whether the episode contributed to him not being appointed in 1958 to the VIII. Consejo Nacional, which translated to expiration of his Cortes ticket; thus, his 21-year term in Consejo and 15-year term in the parliament came to the end.

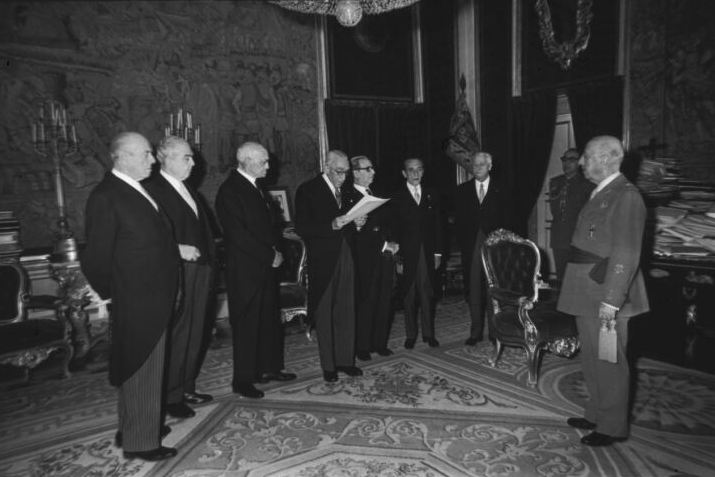
Toledo (1fL) among former Carlist leaders admitted by Franco, 1969

After 1958 de Toledo held no political role, though he continued as member of the EFE managing board, in the mid-1960s hailed as “consejero más antiguo”. There were some schools named after him, few streets and a “Premio José Ibañez Martin y Romualdo de Toledo y Robles”, awarded to the best Grupo Escolar. He kept cultivating personal links with heavyweight collaborationist Carlists, who appeared at weddings of his children, e.g. Iturmendi, Oriol (Antonio) or Bau in 1967. His last political engagement took place in 1969, when prince Carlos Hugo, son to the Carlist king-claimant, was expulsed from Spain. As a propagandistic measure, intended to demonstrate that Traditionalists kept supporting the regime, a group of “prohombres de la Comunión Tradicionalista” was assembled to offer “fervorosa adhesion” to the dictator; the event received massive press coverage. Together with Zamanillo, Oriol (JL), Oreja (R), Carcér and Ramírez Sinues, there was also de Toledo present.

== In historiography ==
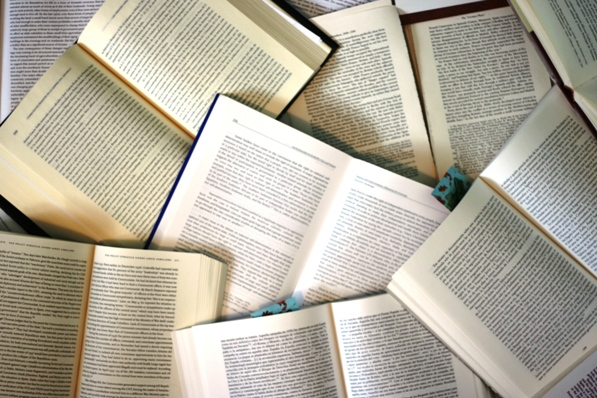

In historiography de Toledo appears mostly as one of key individuals responsible for development of the Francoist primary school system and one of 3-5 most important people in the Ministry of Education during early stages of the regime. He is usually mentioned as the one who did his best to dismantle the Republican system, including purges among teachers. Some authors claim he worked in line with Sainz Rodriguez and advanced the same model based on “national and Catholic ideals of the movement”, others suggest he went further than Sainz when undoing the Republican legislation, namely attempting to remove all traits of Rousseaism. Scholars claim that his key objective was to build education system based on Catholic teaching, going back to the model of St. Benedict though saturating it with the Hispanic tradition. To some he tried to ensure “ideological dominance of Catholicism rather than Fascism in all Spanish education”, yet he might appear also in an opposite role, as “el artífice de la bases de la educación franquista, de clara inspiración fascista”. Single authors prefer rather to mention Traditionalism as his point of reference and one sees him as “encargado de llevar el nuevo espíritu totalitario y católico a las escuelas”. He is usually criticized for implementing what is presented as outdated system, built on discipline and hierarchy and stained by adherence to traditional social roles, nationalism and imperialism.

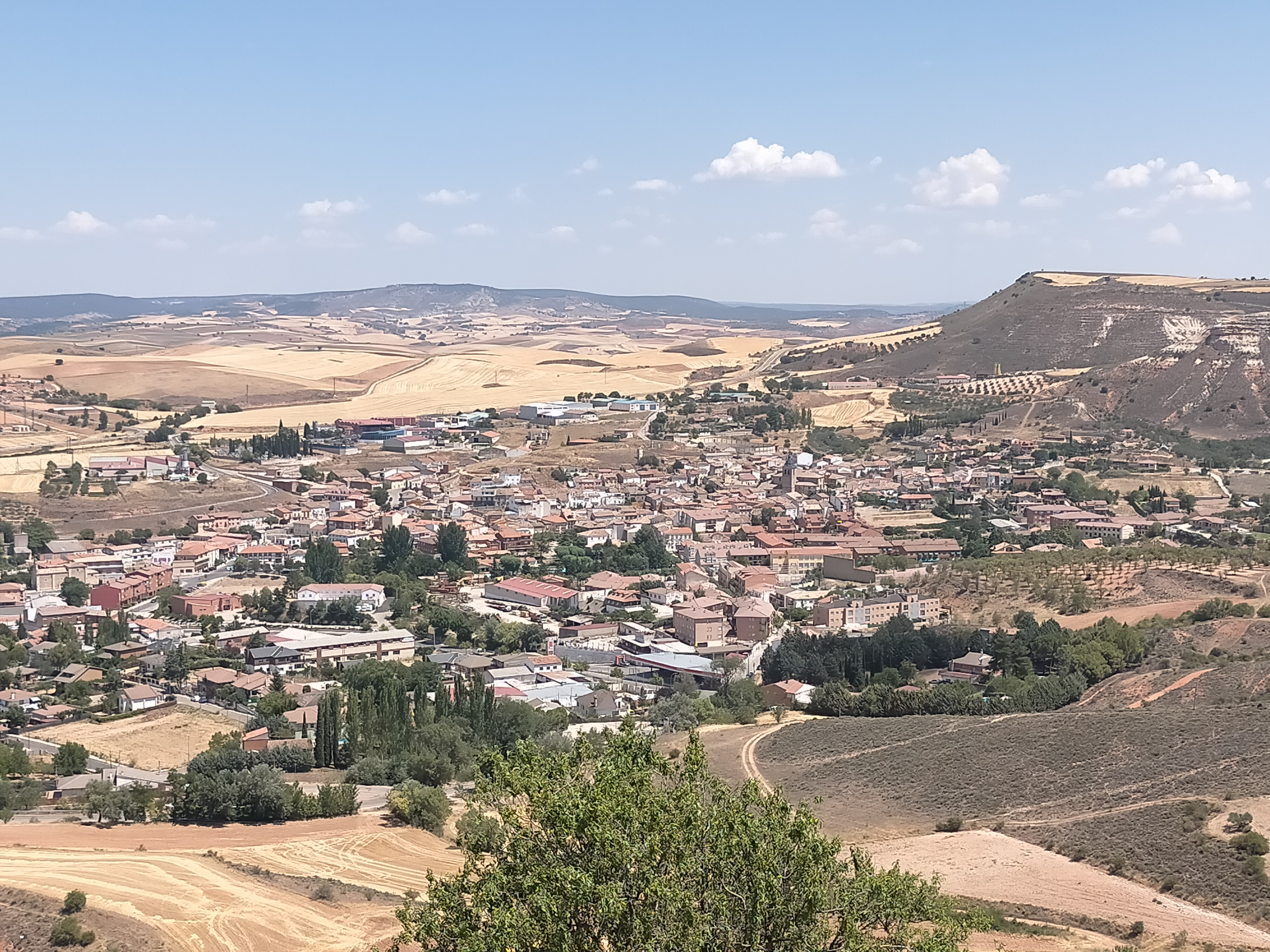
Jadraque, the only school named after de Toledo not renamed until today visible in bottom-right corner

Apart from educational practice, de Toledo is mentioned as one of major architects of Ley de Primera Ensañanza, adopted in 1945. Until then he regulated primary schooling mostly by means of ministerial circulars, though work on the law commenced in already 1938 and Ley Orgánica of 1942 – unclear to what extent drafted by de Toledo - specified some organization foundations of the system. He headed one of two competitive commissions, preparing their own drafts; (the other one was led by Sainz Rodríguez). They were different both in terms of general spirit and structural design of the schooling system. Eventually the law “adopta un criterio ecléctico” and with some modifications of 1965 and 1967 it remained in force until so-called “Ley Villar” was adopted in 1970. One of its characteristic features was sex segregation, which prevailed until the late 1960s. The popular present-day opinion is that the law institutionalized “retroceso importante” in the Spanish education. In terms of numbers, during de Toledo's tenure the illiteracy rate dropped from 23% in 1940 to 17% in 1950, while the gross enrolment ratio in primary education rose from 53% in the schooling year of 1940/41 to 69% in 1951. This was possible, among others, by buildup of de Toledo-designed Servicio Español de Magisterio, the corporative system of educating primary-school teachers, with 23,000 – mostly females – enrolled in the cursillos already in 1939. Historians note that its characteristic feature was focus on rural counties, yet they claim that separate paths for teachers in urban and rural areas might have been counter-productive when it comes to erasing educational inequality across Spain.

== See also ==
- Carlo-francoism
- Traditionalism (Spain)
- Carlism
- Francoism
- History of education in Spain
