= Manglano =

Manglano is a surname. Notable people with the surname include:

- Emilio Alonso Manglano (1926-2013), Spanish military officer
- Iñigo Manglano-Ovalle (born 1961), American conceptual artist
- Joaquín Manglano y Cucaló de Montull (1892–1985), Spanish entrepreneur, official, Catholic activist, and politician
- Percival Manglano (born 1972), Spanish politician
