= Joaquín Manglano y Cucaló de Montull =

Spanish politician

Joaquín Manglano y Cucaló
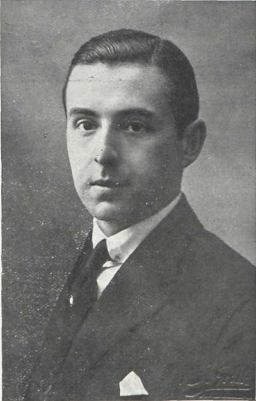
- Born: Joaquín Manglano y Cucalón or Cucaló; 1892; Valencia
- Died: 1985 (aged 92–93); Valencia
- Occupation: landowner
- Known for: official, politician
- Political party: UP, Carlism, FET

Joaquín Manglano y Cucaló de Montull, Grandee of Spain, 15th Baron of Cárcer, 2nd Baron of Beniomer, 18th Baron of Llaurí, 6th Count of Burgo de Laverazo, 2nd Marquis of Altamira de la Puebla, 13th Baron of Alcahalí de San Juan y Mosquera (1892–1985) was a Spanish entrepreneur, official, Catholic activist and politician. In terms of business he is known mostly as member of the Levantine economic oligarchy, in terms of officialdom as a Francoist mayor of Valencia (1939–1943) and a longtime Cortes deputy (1952–1967), in terms of Catholic activity as president of Legión Católica Española and in terms of politics as a Carlist.

== Family and youth ==
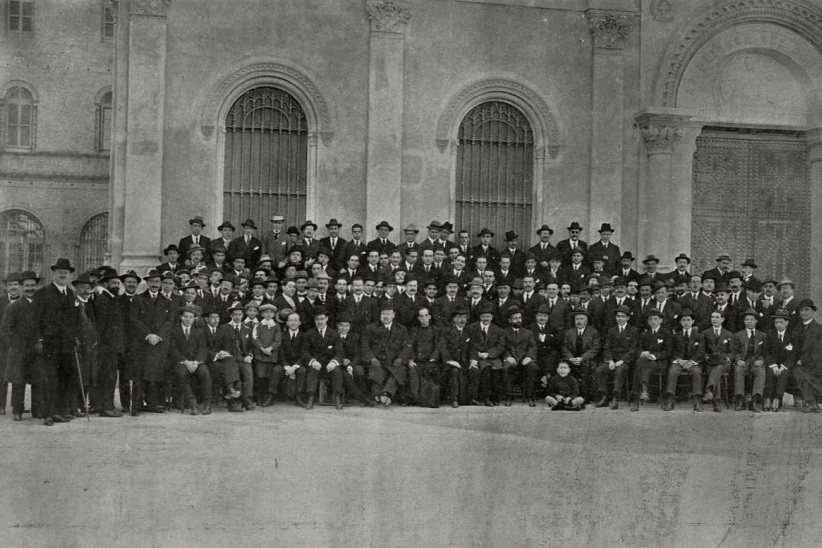
Colegio San José alumni

The Manglano family was first noted in the 14th century, related to Alcarria; they grew to major Castilian landholders in the 16th and 17th century. In the mid-18th century its branch settled in Levante; accumulating land in the Valencia province they grew to regidores and, by means of marriage, entered the aristocratic strata. Joaquín's paternal grandfather, Jose Pedro Manglano y Ruiz (1819-1900), gained new aristocratic titles, in 1867-1868 served as a Cortes deputy and emerged as one of the most prestigious local personalities.

Joaquín's father, Luis Manglano y Palencia (1863–1937), inherited some of the titles and most of the real estate wealth, adding also new honors to his collection; until the 1910s in public realm he was noted mostly as leader of aristocratic Valencian Catholic organizations. He married Josefa Cucaló de Montull y Cubells (1861–1951), a girl of prestigious aristocratic descent who brought yet new titles to the family. The couple had 8 children, Joaquín born as the oldest of the siblings.

Joaquín was first educated - like his father, brothers and sons - at the prestigious Jesuit Colegio San José in Valencia, completing the curriculum in 1908. He then went on to study both law and letters. He spent academic years with University of Valencia, but obtained PhD laurels in 1914 in Madrid thanks to the thesis titled Apuntes para una memoria sobre El Justicia de Valencia. He might have intended to work as a secondary school teacher, but in the mid-1910 he was already referred to as “joven abogado valenciano” and having later inherited most of his fathers’ wealth, lived off the family business. In the 1950s he pursued his interest in history by publishing few works.

In 1922 Manglano married Maria del Pilar Baldoví y Miquel (1902-1999), descendant to a noble Baldoví family, owners of landholdings in Ribera Baixa; she brought to the already opulent marriage the Tancat de la Baldovina, hundreds of hectares of rice-growing areas near Sueca. The couple settled in Valencia, on calle Salvador; they had 5 children, born between 1923 and 1933; though some of them became known locally, none grew to a nationally recognized figure. Emilio Manglano, a military involved in CESID, was his nephew. Percival Manglano, a currently active Spanish politician, is his grand-nephew.

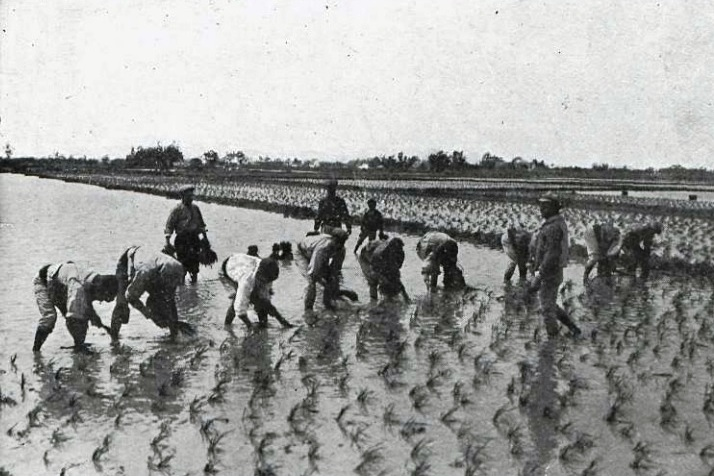
Sueca paddy fields, 1919

Manglano accumulated a number of aristocratic titles. In 1916 he was awarded a long defunct honor of 15. Baron of Cárcer, the name alternatively applied to him by contemporary press and by present-day scholars alike. Following death of his father, in 1949 Manglano was confirmed as 2. barón de Beniomer and 18. barón de Llaurí. In 1950 the regime conferred upon him Grandeza de España. In 1953 he inherited the title and became the 6. Count of Burgo de Laverazo, in 1956 the 2. Marquis of Altamira de la Puebla and in 1962 the 13. Baron of Alcahalí. By the end of his life Manglano ceded some of the titles to his offspring, in one case re-acquiring it as he outlived his son.

== Restoration: maurista, ciervista and datista (prior to 1923) ==
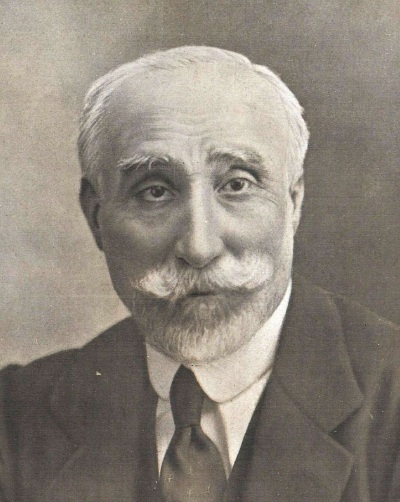
Antonio Maura

Throughout the 19th century Manglano's ascendants did not demonstrate clear political penchant: the Barón de Llaurí family is listed as traditionally pro-Liberal, Barón de Cárcer family as traditionally ambiguous and Barón de Terrateig traditionally Carlist. However, in the early 20th century his father was clearly active as a Conservative. The young Joaquín, apart from having been first noted as joining Orden de Montesa in 1909, during his academic years engaged in emerging Catholic initiatives; they are currently classified as falling somewhere in-between Christian Democracy and Social Catholicism. Influenced by Herrera Oria and ACNDP, in 1912 Manglano was recorded as active in catolicismo agrario, visiting local Levantine villages and advocating workers’ self-organization; in 1913 he contributed himself to setting up Sindicato Cátolico Agrario. In the mid-1910s he was also active in the Valencian Centro de Jovenes para la Defensa Social and together with his father took part in initiatives bringing together various breeds of ultra-conservative groupings, apart from the Conservatives including the Integrists and the Jaimists.

In 1916 Joaquín supported own father in his bid for the Cortes from Nules; in the extremely divided local conservative setting Luis Manglano was elected thanks to support of the right-wing conservative fraction named Maurists, the Carlists, and the Republicans. In 1917 Joaquín appeared among ciervistas, followers of another conservative tycoon, Juan de la Cierva. During the 1918 campaign he decided to compete himself, undoubtedly banking on previous success of his father, also from Nules. Political environment was extremely complex: according to a present-day scholar he was supposed to represent the Maurists and two Carlist groups, the mainstream Jaimists and the local breakaways, named Paquistas, who even set up La Gaceta de Levante to support the campaign. The Carlists eventually supported Jaime Chicharro and it was only the mauristas who backed Cárcer, though contemporary press dubbed Manglano ciervo-datista or ciervista. The result was that with the conservative vote split, the mandate went to a Liberal candidate.

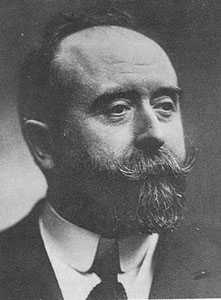
Juan de la Cierva

In 1919 Manglano decided to try again, though political setting was already entirely different: with Maura serving as the prime minister, barón de Cárcer was to stand as a governmental candidate with all electoral pucherazo infrastructure at his disposal. Though initially he was to stand in Nules, it was finally decided that Albocàsser offered better chances; indeed, with no counter-candidate standing, he was declared victorious according to notorious Article 29. During the brief term in the parliament he emerged as a rather active newcomer and was noted mostly as outspoken advocate of governmental support for catholic trade unions, supposed to provide a bulwark against “red workers”. During the following campaign of 1920 Manglano concluded that mauristas had nothing to offer, vacillating between datistas and ciervistas; supposed to run as ciervista he finally resigned; the setting persisted until the 1923 campaign.

== Dictatorship and after: upetista (1923-1931) ==
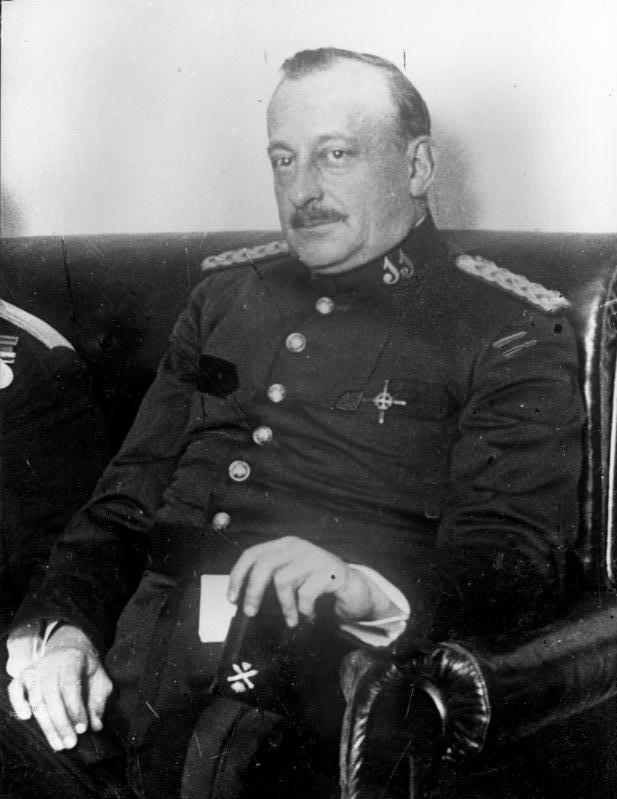
Miguel Primo de Rivera

As the 1923 advent of Primo de Rivera dictatorship brought national political life to a standstill, all existing parties have been dissolved. It is not clear how Manglano approached the end of liberal democracy; however, in January 1924 he was recorded as admitted by the dictator at a personal meeting, when probably Cárcer offered his support for the new regime. Though he was soon noted as engaged in a new primoderiverista state party, Unión Patriótica, until the mid-1920s Manglano was not recorded as landing any jobs either in the party or in the administration. His public activities during that period focused on two areas: business and Catholic initiatives.

Already in the 1910s active in corporate organizations and pressure groups of orange producers, in the early 1920s he emerged as a fairly belligerent speaker, at the Valencian Asamblea Naranjera comparing their militants to soldiers who recognized no limits. In the mid-1920s he rose to executive of Federación de Productores de Naranja de Levante, finally becoming its treasurer. Once he married into the rice business Manglano commenced activities also in their groupings. He animated the local Cámara Oficial Agrícola and Cámara de la Propiedad Rústica, cultivating the trade union link at Sindicato Agrícola de San Bernardo and exploiting his UP connection. On the Catholic side he was active in Legión Católica and Acción Católica, the former an aristocratic and the latter a popular organization. In Acción he grew to propaganda coordinator of the Valencia branch. In Legión he became president of the Valencia organization, member of Consejo Nacional, vice-president and finally president of Legión Católica Española.

At unspecified time Cárcer was nominated to the Valencian ayuntamiento; according to some sources the appointment might have taken place in 1926 and according to other it occurred in January 1927. Neither his exact position nor role is clear; referred to either as regidor, concejal or teniente de alcalde, he was noted as engaged in trade, scholarship, festivities and local suburban administration. He resigned from the city council in August 1928, but in February 1929 was again noted as active; it is not clear when he ceased. Received by Alfonso XIII in 1930, in the early 1931 he was acknowledged as running in the local elections, but nothing is known of their outcome; most likely he lost.

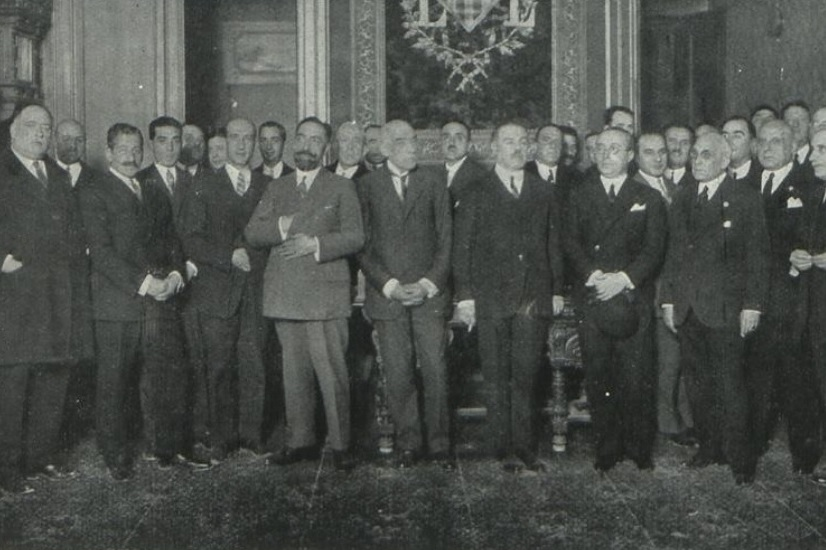
Valencia ayuntamiento, 1927

In the early months of the Republic Cárcer, initially appearing at good terms with local authorities, engaged in conservative meetings united with his old-time rival, Chicharro. Some sources report him taking part in the pro-Alfonsist Acción Española and running for the Cortes from Albocàsser and Vinaròs, information not confirmed elsewhere. By the Left he was clearly recognized as a reactionary enemy: in September 1931 some of his property went up in flames. In February 1932 the civil governor acknowledged him as inflammatory speaker and declared that his meetings would be monitored by the security to ensure he does not go off limits.

== Republic: carlista (1932-1936) ==
Carlist standard

During his early career Cárcer had many close encounters with the Carlists; as a teenager he met them at joint Integrist meetings, negotiated their support when running for the Cortes and by some newspapers was even once reported as their candidate. Privately he used to meet a longtime Valencian Carlist leader, Manuel Simó Marín, at meetings of Colegio San José associates; perhaps most importantly, his mother and his wife came from the Carlist families. However, it was only in the spring of 1932 that he started to visit their meetings and deliver addresses. At that time his Conservative stand adopted a decisively anti-Republican flavor.

It is likely that Manglano engaged in gear-up to the Sanjurjo coup. Official information claimed a contraband of weapons directed to Cárcer had been intercepted, though when it came to details only one pistol was discovered. He was arrested mid-August in Pamplona and released early October 1932. Legal measures taken materialized as expropriation of his landholdings; he was denounced as the one who tried to “set the fire on”. According to some sources he was sent to the Spanish African prison outpost in Villa Cisneros, where he was finally converted to Carlism and joined the movement as part of "Grupo de Villacisneros". In the late 1932 and most of 1933 Manglano was already fully engaged in Carlist propaganda in Levante, demonstrating also a penchant for joint monarchist alliance with Renovación Española. He was briefly detained again in the summer of 1933.

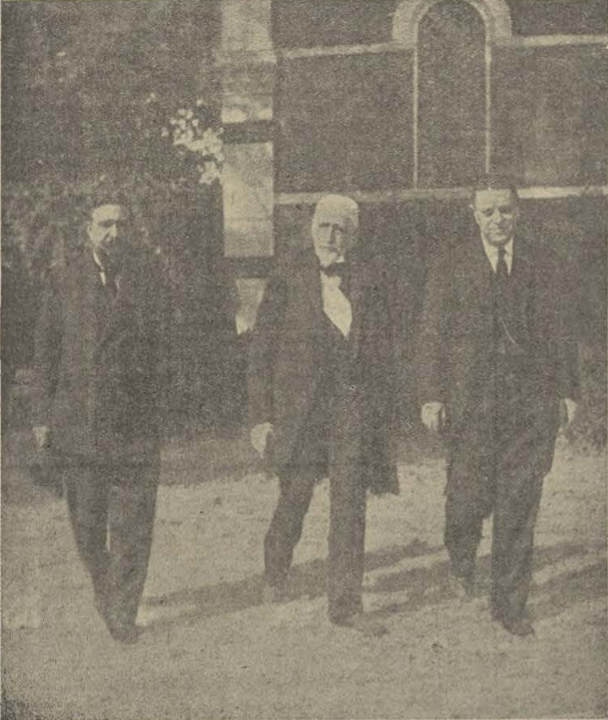
Carlist king Alfonso Carlos, 1930s

In the second Republican campaign to the Cortes Cárcer stood as a Carlist candidate on a joint Valencian Right-wing list; elected, after the 13-year-break he resumed the parliamentary career. In the diet he joined commissión de guerra and indeed remained very active on military-related issues: proposed his own draft on NCOs organization, discussed officer retirement rules, navy armament, operations of the carabineros and above all, demanding larger share of the budget for the army. One of the most active Carlist deputies, Manglano addressed also a number of other questions, ranging from public space to schooling and prison services, with rice and orange production dedicated due attention as well.

In 1934-1936 Cárcer went on with ever-increasing propaganda activities, both in his native area and far beyond it, featured also in Traditionalist press and in 1934 nominated to co-head Delegación de Propaganda within the national Carlist executive. He shared the generally uncompromising and fiercely anti-Republican party line, on the one hand lambasting CEDA and Gil-Robles while on the other demanding harsh measures against Manuel Azaña, charged with supporting the 1934 revolution. It is not clear what his role was in the Levantine party structures; some authors claim he was president of Junta Regional. He was not listed as running in the 1936 electoral campaign, though the issue is not entirely clear. Beyond Carlism, he rose to national executive of Junta Central del Tiro Nacional, a shooting association.

== Civil War: turbulent unificado (1936-1939) ==
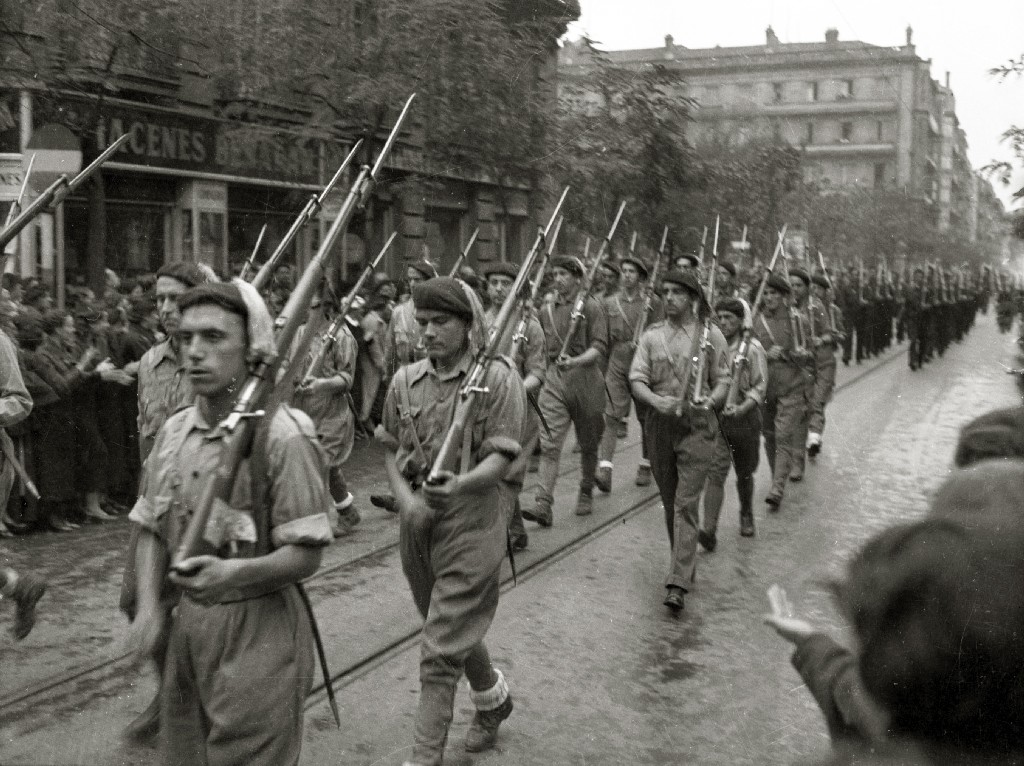
requeté unit on parade

It is obscure whether Cárcer was engaged in the forthcoming coup. When it commenced he was in Irún, an aristocratic summer holiday location or an escape route to France. He soon found his way to Burgos, meeting Mola and offering own services. Outcome of the talks is not clear; it is known, however, that Cárcer's properties in Valencia and Madrid were searched, his brother detained and executed. There is scarce information on Cárcer's whereabouts during late 1936; one author claims he enlisted to Requeté. The most reliable information is that following Nationalist conquest of the city he returned to Irún, together with a number of Levantine Carlists setting up sort of regional Valencian Carlist executive on exile. The group focused on assistance to Levantine refugees and on editing a weekly Valencia. At that time he acted as „comisario carlista por Valencia”.

Supporting the Nationalist army - most likely by financial donations - and remembered for his pro-military Cortes harangues, Cárcer went on well with the military. Member of the Carlist wartime executive, in early 1937 he advocated acceptance of amalgamation of Carlism into Falange Española Tradicionalista, though he refrained from taking part in last-minute attempt of internal coup within the party. In mid-1937 he transformed the exile Carlist Valencian organization into the FET one, the difference having been that it was based in San Sebastián. Some authors identify him merely as member of Secretaría Regional of FET, others claim that until early 1938 was co-heading the Valencian branch. Despite unification, Manglano stuck to his Traditionalist identity; he soon embarked on war against the Falangist old-shirts, competing with them for control of the Valencian FET.

When in the spring of 1938 the Nationalist troops seized first comarcas of the Valencian region, rivalry to control its FET branch translated into rivalry for real power. With Castellón province fully controlled by May, in June Cárcer was appointed head of the provincial FET, one of 3 most important civil positions in every province. When speculating about his nomination scholars consider Francoist policy of keeping different political families in check by balancing their influence, Cárcer's good relations with Serrano Suñer or pressure on part of pro-Carlist Army of Levante commander, general Orgaz.

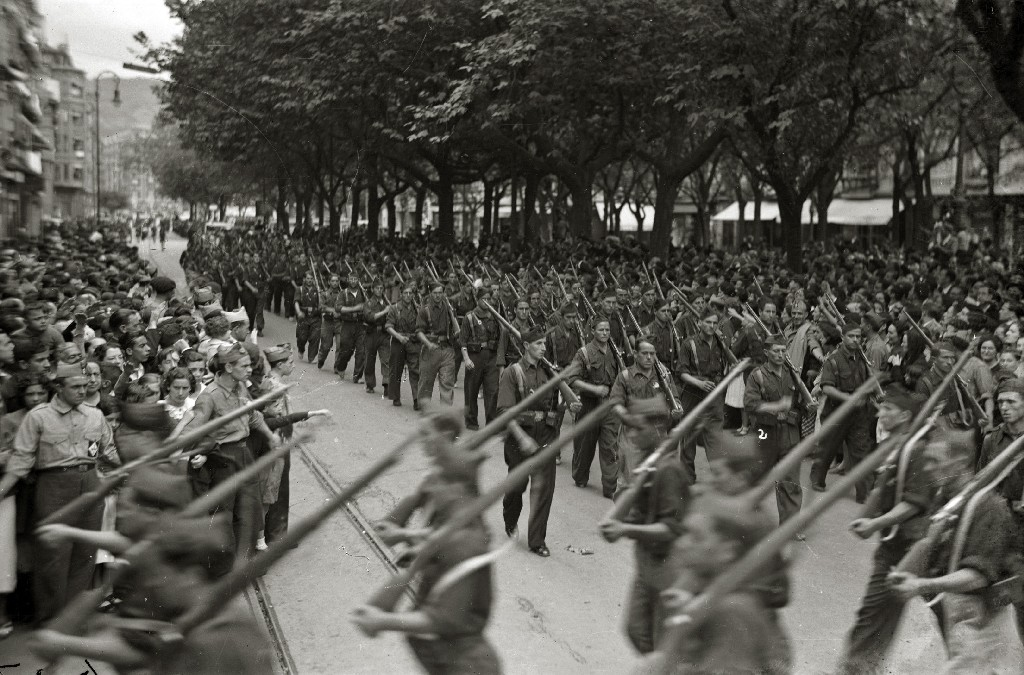
Falange unit on parade

Once appointed, Manglano embarked on all-out war against the Falangist old-shirts, trying to turn the province into a Carlist fiefdom. He denounced them as disguised Leftists, did his best to get the Falangist military unit, Bandera Valenciana, dissolved, and appointed Traditionalists to key positions in party and administrative structures. In later reports he was denounced as sabotaging unification, spending party money on Traditionalist propaganda and allowing Carlist youth to prowl the streets shouting “Viva el Rey”. However, the Falangists stroke back, complaining about his omnipresence. In October 1938 Cárcer travelled to Burgos to enhance his position, but the mission backfired. In January 1939 he was dismissed from the Castellón FET jefatura. Total personal reshuffling followed and the attempt to ensure Carlist domination in the province ended up in failure.

== Early Francoism: official (1939-1943) ==
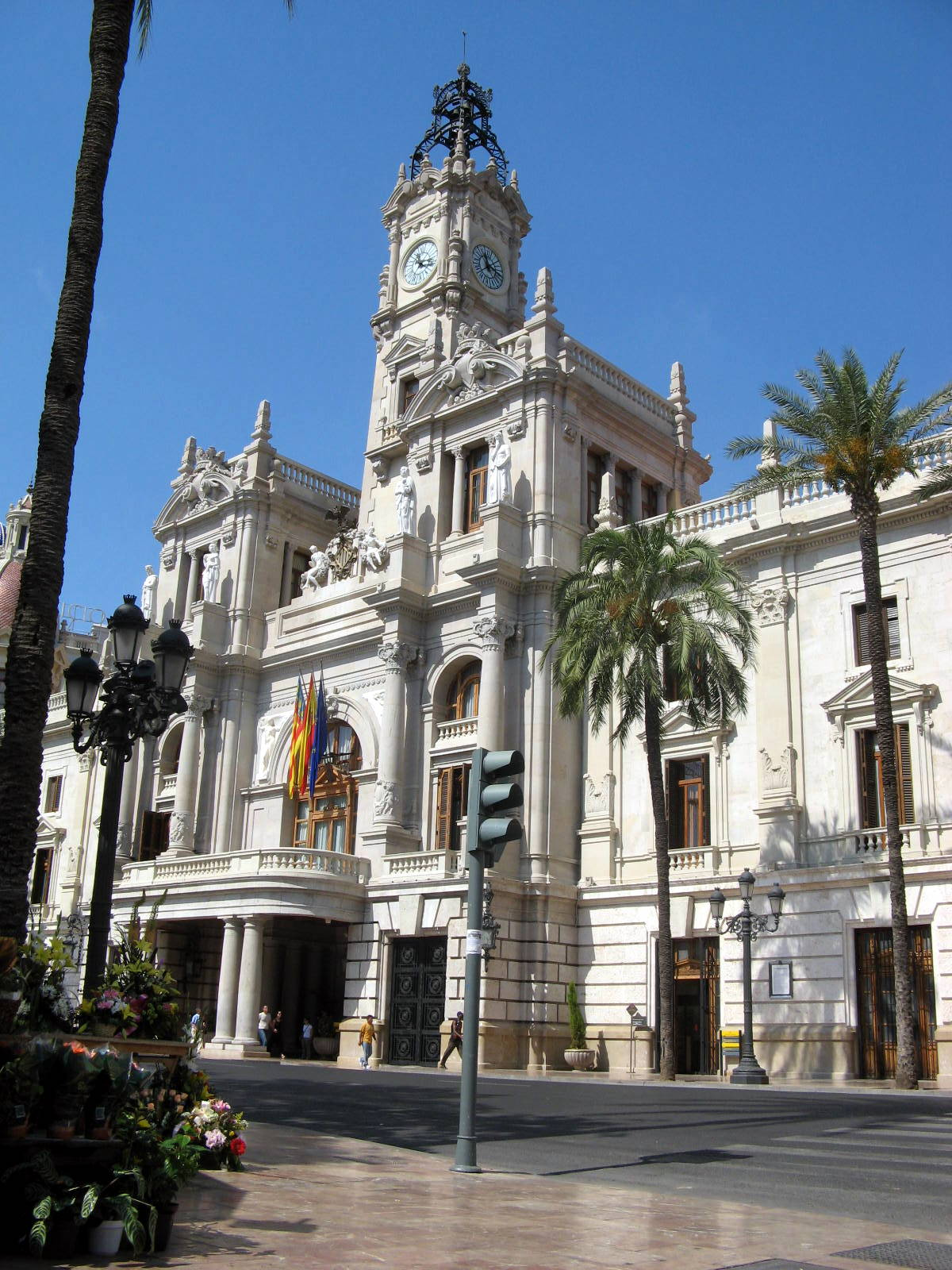
Valencia, ayuntamiento

Though Manglano's dismissal from provincial Castellón jefatura might have looked like a fall from grace, it turned out to have been an episode in the Francoist checks-and-balances policy. Soon after in April 1939 the Nationalist troops entered Valencia, he was nominated mayor of the city, at that time the third largest urban centre of Spain. The post rendered him one of the most powerful Carlist politicians within Francoist structures, second only to the then Minister of Justice, conde Rodezno. Unlike in Castellón, his relations with FET were good, even though he resumed his strategy of favoring Traditionalist sympathizers. Another preference visible in his personal policy was nominating individuals related to local business oligarchy; never again in the Valencian history would it have such a firm grip on local government.

As mayor Cárcer focused on reconstruction and urban re-organization. The former was mostly related to the maritime quarter, heavily bombed during the war, and to restoration of pre-Republican monuments and facilities, especially the Catholic ones. The latter was about expansion towards the sea and Dehesa del Saler, pushing the railroad rings suffocating the city traffic into the tunnels and turning Avenida del Oeste into a modern city axis, together with setting a number of similar, major streets. He tried to address massive housing shortages by launching cheap community houses project and to deal with dramatically underdeveloped education infrastructure. Minor but lasting projects were construction of a new bus terminal, building food markets, especially the central Mercado de abastos, and re-claiming heritage sites. He also defended usage of valenciano against espanolismo of the civil governor.

In terms of urban planning the Cárcer term is criticized as improvisation, especially that the first long-term plan was approved after he had left. Setting new straight major throughways was already in the 1940s lambasted as childish and anti-social, as it led to destruction of historical boroughs and demolition of existing houses with no replacement provided. Management of municipal finances, considered totally chaotic, attracts even heavier criticism. Though during the 1940 audience with Franco Cárcer ensured hefty credit line, his concept of enhancing city income relied mostly on "politica annexionista". For some time the city used the 1935 budget for its planning, the result having been a major deficit.

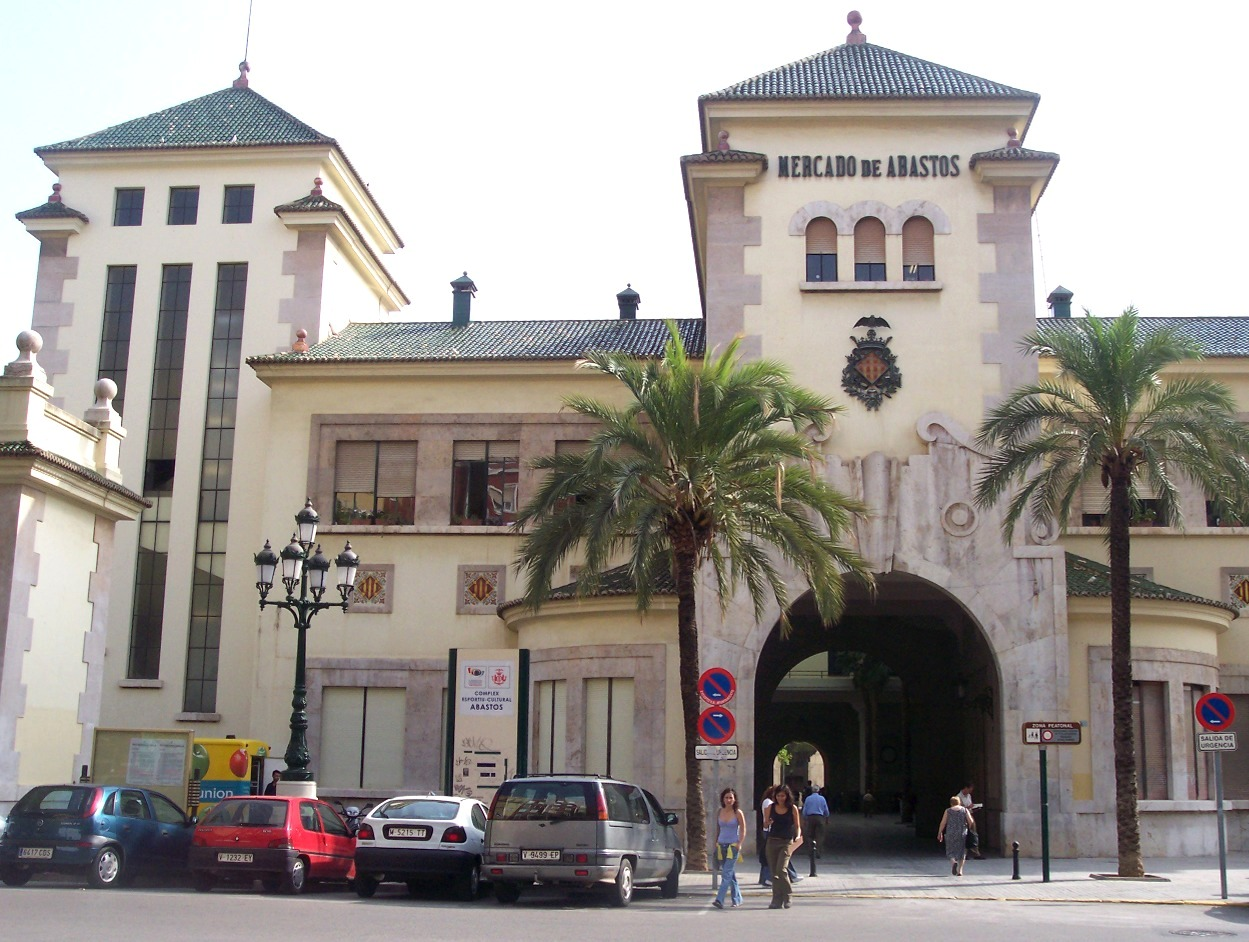
Mercado de Abastos, Valencia

Manglano's mayorship is subject to general onslaught as the period of massive real estate speculation, by some scholars considered key feature of his rule. With loose building regulations disguised as "favoring labor", Valencia became a Mecca of construction companies and petrified domination of local economic tycoons. Though in the 1980s a local daily hailed him as great mayor, in both scholarly works and radical Left-wing propaganda Manglano is lambasted as incompetent and chaotic administrator and representative of local Fascist oligarchy. It is not clear whether this opinion was shared by his contemporaries. It is also unknown whether the Falangist – Carlist rivalry or any other politics was in play when he ceased as mayor in 1943.

== Mid-Francoism: sindicalista and dignitary (1943-1967) ==
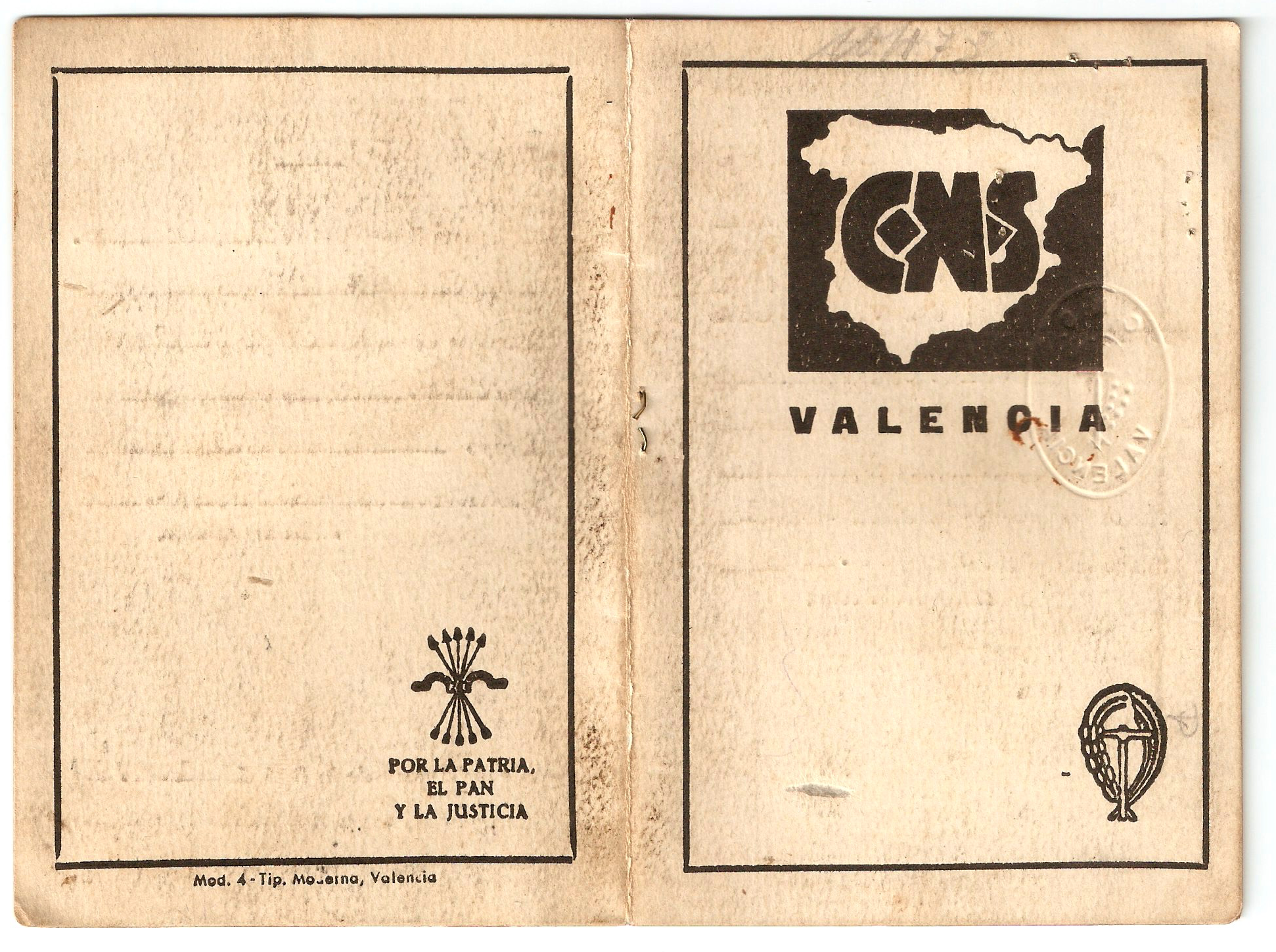
Central Nacional Sindicalista ID card

Though as mayor of a provincial capital Cárcer was entitled to enter the 1943-created Francoist diet, Cortes Españoles, once he stepped down as alcalde he lost also the parliamentary ticket; his term lasted merely 2 months. It is not clear whether he was sidetracked or withdrew from major politics; as in 1944 he was received by Franco it does not seem that he found himself in disfavor, though since the mid-1940s he held no major posts in the party, state structures or local Valencian administration.

Cárcer key system roles were those related to a peculiar realm of the Francoist labor organization, supposed to unite workers and proprietors. He was jefe of Hermandad Sindical Provincial de Labradores y Ganaderos de Valencia and member of Comité Sindical de la Seda within Comisión de Incorporación Industrial y Mercantil. Active in Juntas Nacionales de los Grupos de Producción y de Industriales y Elaboradores de Arroz within Sindicato de Cereales, later he grew to directivo of Sindicatos Agrarios of Movimiento; it is not clear when he ceased. On the business side, he entered executive boards of Luso Española de Porcelanas, Banco de España, Naviliera Industrial Española and Compania Valenciana de Cementos Portland. Manglano went on also with his orange and rice businesses, anxious that the Francoist policy of nearing the Axis might damage fruit exports to Britain.

At the turn of the decades Cárcer's star was on the rise again. In 1949 he got aristocratic titles, inherited from his late father though not formally acknowledged since 1937, recognized by Franco; in 1950 the dictator conferred upon him Grandeza de España, the honor received with the likes of José Moscardó, José Calvo Sotelo, Emilio Mola Vidal and José Antonio Primo de Rivera. In 1952 admitted again by Franco, the same year Manglano was appointed to the 6. Consejo Nacional of the Movimiento, which in turn guaranteed – following the pause of 9 years – a seat in the Cortes. Franco kept appointing Cárcer to 5 consecutive Falangist councils, which translated into prolongation of Cortes mandates in 1955, 1958, 1961 and 1964.

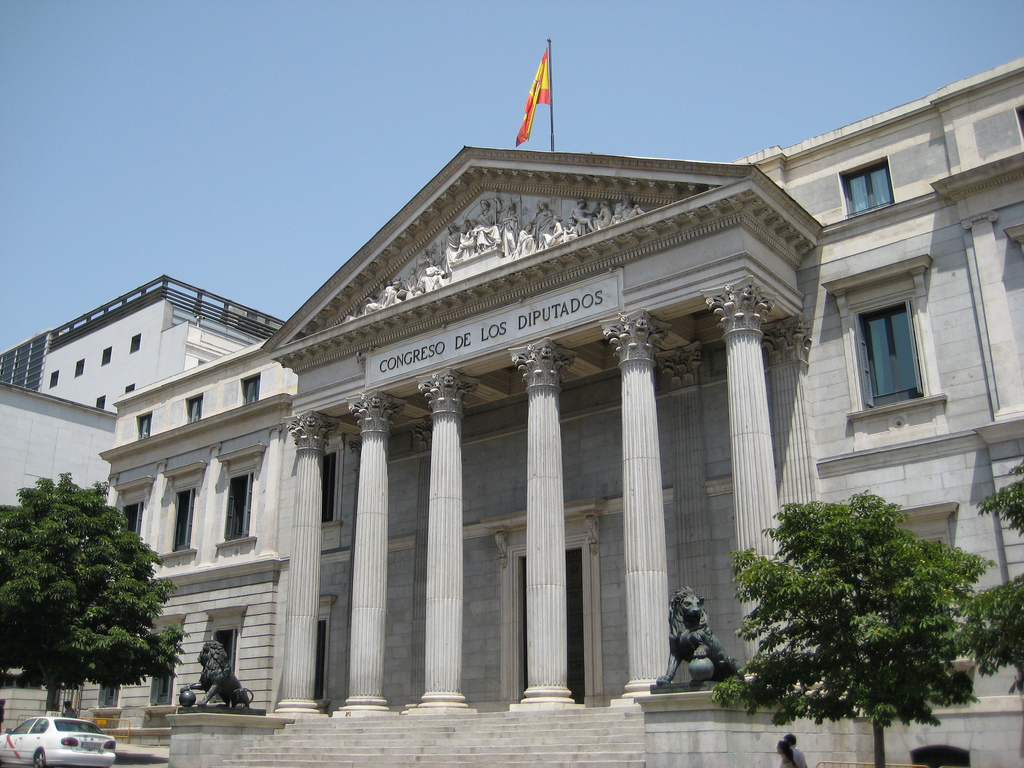
Cortes site

Throughout the 1950s and 1960s Cárcer did not play any role in national politics; Consejo Nacional and Cortes Españolas were largely decorative bodies which ensured prestige and connections, but not political power. He is noted as member of many committees and groups, taking part in a number of parliamentary debates of moderate importance, e.g. those shaping the rural fiscal regime or regulating women's access to juridical jobs; only some, like nationalizing of Banca de España, the move he fruitlessly opposed, carried a lot of weight. None of these interventions compares to his hectic activity during the 1967 discussion related to law on religious liberty. Cárcer emerged as one of the most outspoken and vehement opponents of the draft and was a number of times noted as trying to block the legislation.

== Late Francoism and Second Restoration: retiree (after 1967) ==
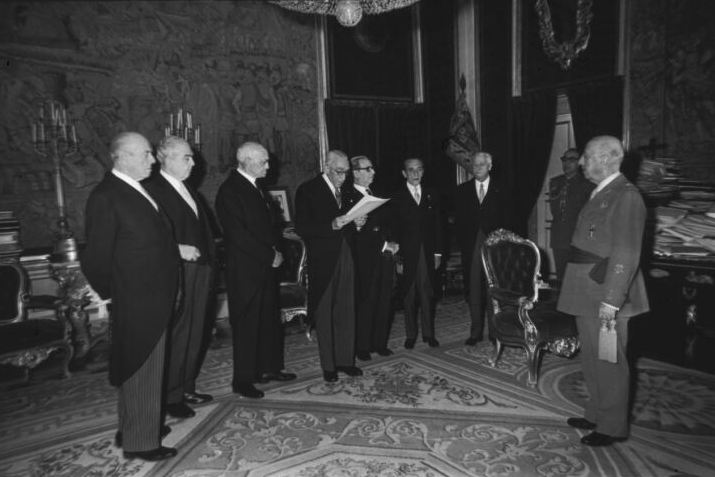
Cárcer (7fL) during homage address of Traditionalist ex-deputies to Franco, 1969

In 1967 Cárcer was not appointed to Consejo Nacional; it is not clear whether his religious zeal carried him too far away or whether himself he decided to test his popularity in the newly opened pool of Cortes mandates, up for grabs in semi-free elections from the so-called tercio familiar. He stood in his native Valencia but lost and had to renounce the mandate. His last and his first days in the Spanish diet are spanned by 48 years, rendering Cárcer one of the national record-holders in terms of duration of parliamentary career.

Cárcer retained anti-Falangist, Traditionalist identity, which was not incompatible with an "extreme addiction to the regime". On the other hand, his stand was irreconcilable with intransigent opposition originally mounted by the Carlist leader, Manuel Fal. Cárcer sided rather with his rival, conde Rodezno, leader of the breakaway faction pursuing a collaborationist path. In the mid-1940s he neared the Alfonsist claimant Don Juan, by the Rodeznistas considered a would-be candidate to the throne also according to the Carlist reading. In the 1950s he definitely broke with the regent Don Javier and declared Don Juan the legitimate heir; Cárcer entered his Consejo Privado and was nominated royal representative in Region Valenciana.

Though since the early post-war years Cárcer had nothing to do with mainstream Carlism, he kept considering himself a Carlist. When received by Franco in 1970, together with other collaborationists he claimed to have represented "antiguo Comunión Tradicionalista". At that time Carlism was being taken over by a progressist, socialist faction of Don Javier's son, Don Carlos Hugo. Together with a number of other Traditionalists Cárcer attempted to mount a counter-strike; in an open 1974 letter to Carlist leaders expulsed by the Hugocarlistas, Zamanillo and Valiente, he advocated merging all traditionally minded Carlist factions - Hermandad del Maestrazgo, Centro Zumalacarregui, Regencia de Estella, Circulos Vazquez de Mella – into a new Comunión, which would "form part of Movimiento Nacional and serve Catholic faith and Spain" under the orders of Franco and the future king, Juan Carlos.

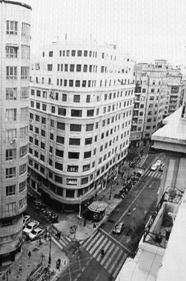
Avenida Barón de Cárcer

After the death of Franco and during dismantling of his regime Cárcer withdrew from politics and public life, as octogenarian hardly active in aristocratic Catholic organizations like Real Hermandad del Santo Calíz de Valencia, the congregation he presided. None of the nationwide newspapers acknowledged his death in an editorial, except for paid obituaries. He gained no monograph and in scholarly discourse is extensively featured only in a single work on early Francoism in Valencia. In public debate his name is referred to during efforts to rename Avenida Barón de Cárcer, the name Avenida del Oeste was given in the 1940s. Though some claim that the name honors ancient holders of the title, militant democratic groupings demand that the street is purged according to the Ley de Memoria Historica regulations. From some viewpoints – present also in scholarly works – his name is noted when denouncing the current Spanish system as merely a "formal democracy", in fact continuation of the Fascist Francoist setting.

== See also ==
- Carlism
- Valencia
- Carlo-francoism
- Baronía de Cárcer
- Baronía de Llaurí
- Baronía de Beniomer
- Condado del Burgo de Lavezaro
- Marquesado de Altamira de Puebla
