= La Nación (Spain) =

Spanish newspaper (1925-1936)

- Type: Daily newspaper
- Founded: October 19, 1925
- Ceased publication: March 13, 1936
- Language: Spanish
- City: Madrid
- Country: Spain
- ISSN: 1132-046X

La Nación was a Spanish newspaper published in Madrid between 1925 and 1936. Sponsored and financed by the administration of the Dictatorship of Primo de Rivera, it had a staff that was also the basis of the newspaper: "Justicia, Paz y Trabajo" (Justice, Peace and Work). It had its head office at number 3, Marqués de Monasterio Street, next to the María Guerrero Theater.

== History ==
=== Dictatorship of Primo de Rivera ===
The newspaper, of an evening nature, published its first issue on October 19, 1925.

Initially, Lieutenant Colonel Pedro Rico Parada, who had been the Director of Censorship for years, was appointed editor. Subsequently, this fact motivated his replacement by Manuel Delgado Barreto, a journalist who became an important figure of the publication between the end of 1925 and April 1936. The newspaper had the collaboration of figures such as Ramiro de Maeztu, José Antonio Primo de Rivera, José María Pemán, José Calvo Sotelo, Alonso Quijano, César de Alda (pseudonym of César González Ruano), Francisco Gambín, Gonzalo Latorre and as cartoonists Gerardo Fernández de la Reguera "Areuger" and Joaquín de Alba, "Kin".

During the dictatorship of Primo de Rivera, the newspaper was the central organ of the Unión Patriótica and was also the "official" newspaper of the regime.

=== Second Republic ===
With the fall of the regime of Primo de Rivera, it became the voice of the most extreme right-wing sector of the Unión Monárquica Nacional, harshly criticizing the CEDA, and especially Gil-Robles, whom it did not consider suitable to lead the right-wing reaction.

During the years of the Second Republic, La Nación maintained a monarchist editorial line with some philo-fascist sympathies. From February 1933, coinciding with Hitler's rise to power, the newspaper launched a campaign in favor of fascism as a mass political alternative for Spain, under the supervision of Mussolini's regime.

In 1933, with the formation of the Spanish Falange, it published an article in which it showed sympathy for the new movement and became the only newspaper to reproduce in full the speeches made at that time. However, it soon abandoned this link to become the propaganda arm of the National Bloc led by José Calvo Sotelo. From December 1935 to March 1936, the subjects of most interest were articles on revolution and counterrevolution, aimed at mobilizing right-wing groups with the objective of putting an end to the Republican regime established in Spain. There were numerous articles on the need to save Spain from the crisis and appeals to "stay in place" with "hope in God and thoughts on the Homeland".

The Revolution of October 6, 1934, occupied many reports. The deaths, murders, church burnings and persecutions became for the newspaper its main propaganda weapon, becoming the preferred theme during the election campaign of February 1936. The threatening tone of an even more tragic revolution if the Popular Front supporters triumphed was decisive in countless information, opinion articles and editorials. Only a "right-wing reaction" could save Spain from that wave of terror, according to what could be read in its pages.

In retaliation for the attack against the socialist professor Luis Jiménez de Asúa, in which his police escort was killed, the newspaper's workshops were set on fire and practically destroyed in their entirety. Thus, it published its last issue on March 13, 1936.

After the outbreak of the Civil War, several editors of the newspaper were shot.

== Bibliography ==
- Avilés Farré, Juan; Elizalde Pérez-Grueso, María Dolores; Sueiro Seoane, Susana (2002). Historia política de España, 1875-1939 (in Spanish). Tres Cantos: Ediciones Istmo.
- Barreiro Gordillo, Cristina (2004). Prensa monárquica en la Segunda República. Los diarios madrileños (in Spanish). Grafite Ediciones.
- Cabrera Calvo-Sotelo, Mercedes (2011). Juan March (1880-1962) (in Spanish). Madrid: Marcial Pons. ISBN 9788492820405.
- Checa Godoy, Antonio (1989). Prensa y partidos políticos durante la II República (in Spanish). Universidad de Salamanca. ISBN 84-7481-521-5.
- Egido León, María de los Ángeles (1987). La concepción de la política exterior española durante la II República (1931-1936) (in Spanish). Madrid: UNED.
- Esteban, José (2000). El Madrid de la República (in Spanish). Madrid: Sílex.
- Gea, María Isabel (2002). Diccionario enciclopédico de Madrid (in Spanish). Madrid: Ediciones La Librería. ISBN 8495889099.
- González Calleja, Eduardo (2011). Contrarrevolucionarios: Radicalización violenta de las derechas durante la Segunda República, 1931-1936 (in Spanish). Alianza Editorial. ISBN 978-84-206-6455-2.
- Langa Nuño, Concha (2007). De cómo se improvisó el franquismo durante la Guerra Civil: la aportación del ABC de Sevilla (in Spanish). Centro de Estudios Andaluces. ISBN 9788461153336.
