= Manuel Delgado Barreto =

Spanish journalist and politician

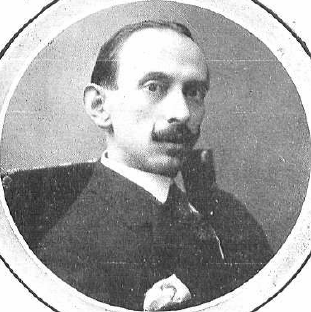

Member of the Consultative National Assembly
- In office 1927–1930

member of the Congress of Deputies
- In office 1914–1916, 1919–1920

Personal details
- Born: 29 September 1879; San Cristóbal de La Laguna
- Died: 7 November 1936; Paracuellos de Jarama
- Occupation: journalist

Manuel Delgado Barreto (1879–1936) was a Spanish journalist and far-right politician.

== Early career ==
Delgado founded the literary magazine Gente Nueva and the newspaper La Opinión. In 1901 he settled in Madrid, holding the position of editor of El Globo. Delgado later moved to La Correspondencia de España, where he used the pseudonym of "Taf". He also contributed to the newspaper La Nación.

== See also ==
- List of journalists killed in Europe
