= National Council of the Movement =

Spanish institution from Francoist regime

National Council of the Movement Consejo Nacional del Movimiento

Type
- Type: Advisory body

History
- Established: 19 October 1937
- Disbanded: 16 June 1977

Meeting place
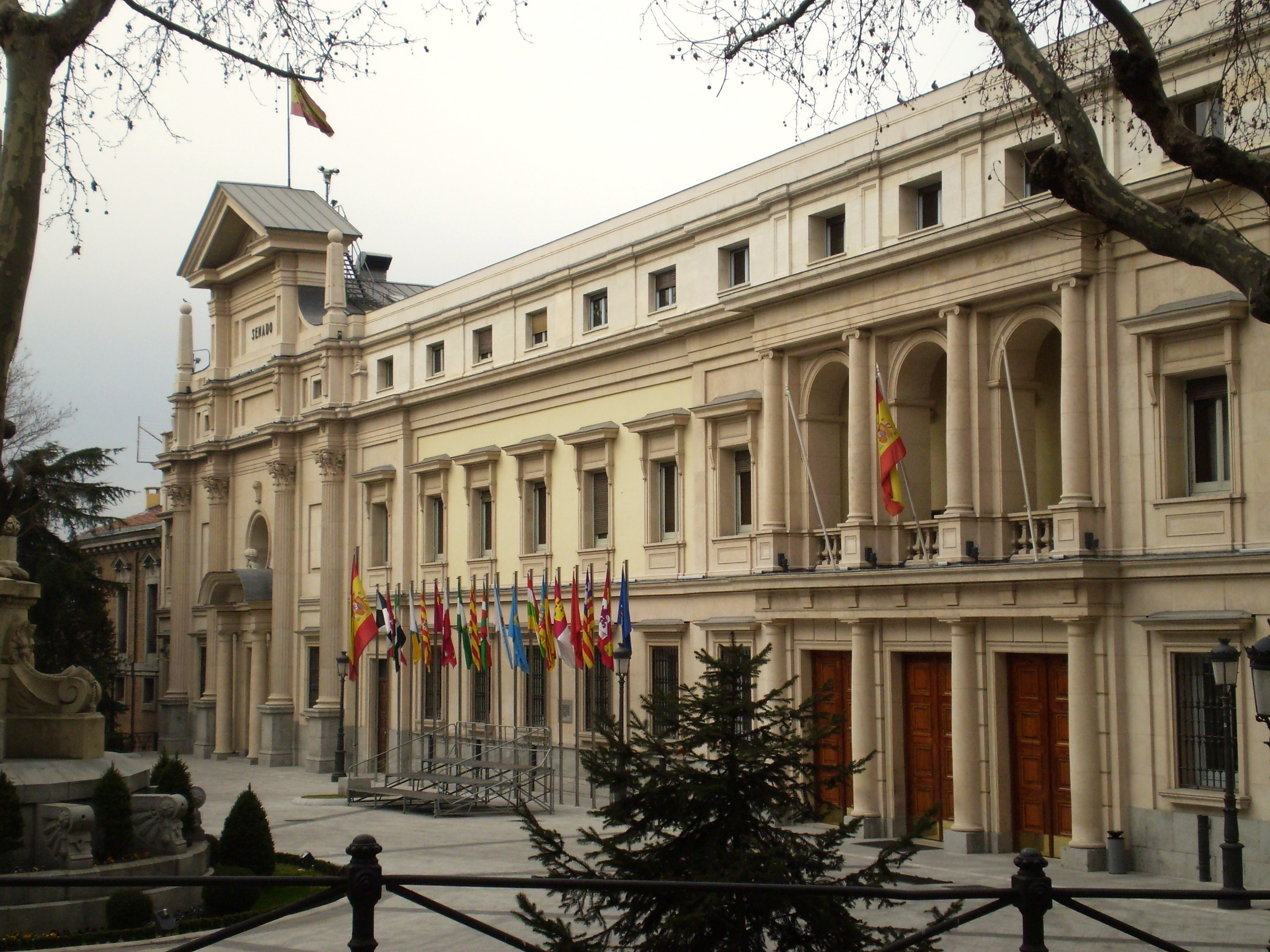
- Palace of the Senate, Madrid

The National Council of the Movement (Spanish: Consejo Nacional del Movimiento, originally Consejo Nacional de FET y de las JONS), was an institution of the Francoist dictatorship of a collegiate nature, which was subordinated to the Head of State. Originally created under the name of the National Council of FET and the JONS on 19 October 1937 in the midst of the Civil War, it would continue to exist until 1977, following the death of Francisco Franco and the dismantling of institutions of his regime.

Its internal structure was strongly inspired by the Italian Grand Council of Fascism and the National Council of the National Fascist Party. Its members, the councillors, with a maximum number of 50 were first appointed by Franco in 1937, integrating all the political forces that intervened in the coup d'état of July 1936 that started the Civil War, and that had been unified by decree in April 1937 under the name of Falange Española Tradicionalista y de las JONS (FET y de las JONS).

It met for the first time in December 1937 at the Monastery of las Huelgas in Burgos. Later, after the end of the war, it would meet in the old Palace of the Senate in Madrid. Like the Francoist Cortes, the National Council would be dissolved shortly before the 1977 elections.

== History ==
=== Creation ===
The National Council of the Traditionalist Spanish Falange and the JONS (FET y de las JONS) was created by the Unification Decree by which the single party of the Francoist dictatorship was founded. It took as a model the National Council of the Spanish Falange of the JONS, whose merger with the Carlist Traditionalist Communion, gave birth to FET y de las JONS. In the second article of the Unification Decree it was stated:

The governing bodies of the new national political entity will be the Head of State, a Secretariat or Political Board and the National Council. [...] The Council will take cognizance of the great national problems that the Head of State submits to it in the terms that will be established in complementary provisions.

The decree also established a Political Secretariat that, with the mission of directing the march of the new organization, would be made up of the most distinguished Falangist and traditionalist elements, under the presidency of the dictator Francisco Franco.

On 5 August 1937, Franco promulgated the statutes of FET and JONS, defined as "the inspiring Militant Movement and base of the Spanish State", in which it was established that "the Movement, in terms of organization, would include three classes of active members: militants, who were all those affiliated with the existing political groupings at the time of Unification (a way of fusing old shirts with new shirts and traditionalists); military, since all active generals, chiefs, officers and classes of the Army were considered full members; and adherents, who once again registered and were required to prove service capacity before becoming militants.

Regarding the National Council, in the statutes it was said that it would be made up of the National Chief (the Caudillo himself), the president and vice president of the Political Junta, the head of the Militias and the delegates of the different services of the party, in addition to those that the Caudillo designated "by reason of his hierarchy in the State, up to a number not exceeding twelve and those who are in attention to their merits and exceptional services." It was chaired by the National Chief (Franco) who was the only one who could convene it and establish the agenda for the deliberations. As for its powers, it was said that they were to "know" (not decide) the guidelines of the organizations of the Movement and the State, as well as "all the great national issues submitted by the Head of the Movement.

=== First Council ===
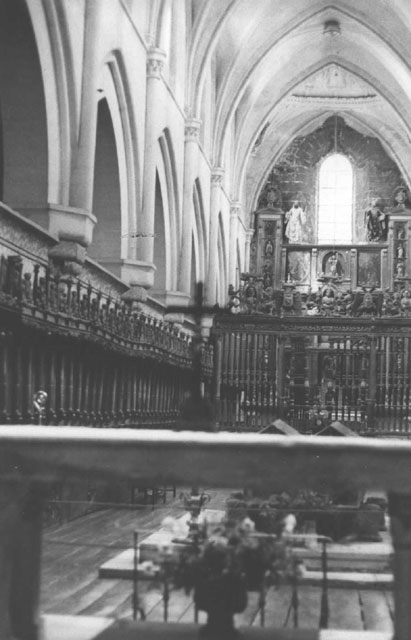
Interior of the abbey church of Monastery of Las Huelgas in Burgos, where the First National Council of FET and JONS was held.

In November 1937, General Franco appointed the fifty members of the National Council. As was the case with the rest of the party bodies, the Political Board was made up of six Falangists and four Carlists; there were only eight Carlists at the head of the Provincial Boards) the majority of those appointed by Franco were Falangists (twenty-six), while the Carlists were only eleven and the monarchists six (six soldiers completed their fifties).

The first National Council of FET and JONS was held on 2 December 1937 at the Monastery of Las Huelgas in Burgos. The Council was made up of 50 members and brought together various political tendencies, with a majority of old Falangists (Pilar Primo de Rivera, Mercedes Sanz, Fernández-Cuesta, Agustín Aznar, Ridruejo, Girón, Sancho Dávila, Jesús Suevos) and neo-Falangists (Gamero del Castillo), which together exceeded fifty percent (they totaled twenty-six).

With them, traditionalists (Tomás Domínguez Arévalo, Romualdo de Toledo y Robles and Fal Conde, who did not attend), monarchists (José María Pemán, Eugenio Montes Domínguez, Yanguas, Valdecasas, Vegas, Pedro Sainz Rodríguez) and military (Gonzalo Queipo de Llano, Jordana, Juan Yagüe, Juan Luis Beigbeder, José Monasterio Ituarte).

== Bibliography ==
- Bardavío, Joaquín; Sinova, Justino (2000). Todo Franco. Franquismo y antifranquismo de la A a la Z (in Spanish). Plaza & Janés.
- Canal, Jordi (2006). Banderas blancas, boinas rojas: una historia política del carlismo, 1876-1939 (in Spanish). Marcial Pons Historia. ISBN 84-96467-34-1.
- Giménez Martínez, Miguel Ángel (2015). El Consejo Nacional del Movimiento: la "cámara de las ideas" del franquismo (in Spanish). Investigaciones históricas. pp. 271–298. ISSN 0210-9425.
- Rodríguez Jiménez, José Luis (1997). La extrema derecha española en el siglo XX (in Spanish). Alianza Editorial. ISBN 84-206-2887-5.
