= National Monarchist Union (Spain, 1930) =

National Monarchist Union Unión Monárquica Nacional
- President: Rafael Benjumea y Burín
- Secretary: Santiago Fuentes Pila
- Founded: 1930; 96 years ago
- Dissolved: 1934; 92 years ago
- Merged into: Renovación Española
- Youth wing: Juventudes de Unión Monárquica Nacional
- Ideology: Monarchism; Authoritarian conservatism
- Political position: Far-right

The National Monarchist Union (Spanish: Unión Monárquica Nacional; UMN) was a Spanish political party, founded in April 1930 as successor to the Patriotic Union, the official party promoted by the dictatorship of Primo de Rivera. Its leadership comprised several ministers of the regime as well as the son of the dictator. Featuring a Neo-Conservative matrix, the party included nonetheless an active group of representatives of the radical right and vouched for the installation of an authoritarian monarchy.

== History ==
Some of the leading figures included José Calvo Sotelo, Ramiro de Maeztu, José de Yanguas Messía, Eduardo Callejo de la Cuesta, Galo Ponte y Escartín, the marqués de Quintanar, Manuel Delgado Barreto (editor of La Nación), José Gavilán (the former chairman of the Patriotic Union), José Antonio Primo de Rivera (the son of the dictator) and the Count of Guadalhorce, who would become the party leader, as it had been the wish of the deceased dictator. Its membership fed from public officers, politicians of the dictatorship, businessmen and engineers.

There were other minor proposals in the spectrum of the monarchist far right similar to the UMN in 1930: the Independent Monarchist Youth, Monarchist Action, Association of Citizen Reaction of the Alfonso XIII's Monarchist Socialist Party, yet they played a marginal role.

== See also ==
- La Nación (Spain)
