= Percival Manglano =

Spanish politician (born 1972)

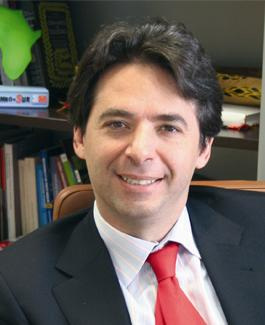
- Manglano in 2011

Member of the Congress of Deputies
- In office 5 April 2022 – 30 May 2023
- Preceded by: Pablo Casado
- Constituency: Madrid

Personal details
- Born: 8 November 1972 (age 53)
- Party: People's Party

Percival Peter Manglano Albacar (born 8 November 1972) is a Spanish politician. From 2022 to 2023, he was a member of the Congress of Deputies. From 2011 to 2012, he served as minister of economy and finance of the Community of Madrid. From 2015 to 2019, he was a member of the City Council of Madrid.
