= Patriotic Union (Spain) =

Patriotic Union Unión Patriótica
- Leader: Miguel Primo de Rivera
- Founded: 14 April 1924
- Dissolved: 1930
- Succeeded by: National Monarchist Union
- Headquarters: Madrid, Spain
- Newspaper: La Nación
- Ideology: Spanish nationalism Political Catholicism; Monarchism; Authoritarian conservatism Corporatism
- Political position: Far-right

The Patriotic Union (Spanish: Unión Patriótica, UP) was a political party created by Spanish dictator Miguel Primo de Rivera, conceived to support his regime and consolidate the interests of political Catholics, technocrats, and the business-owning classes. The party's power was dependent upon the power of its founder and leader, rather than any popular mandate. Following the dismissal of Miguel Primo de Rivera in January 1930 by King Alfonso XIII, the party dissolved itself, and a small number of de Rivera loyalists regrouped under the banner of a new party called the National Monarchist Union.

== Membership ==
There is no reliable information on membership figures. The party review Unión Patriótica claimed in 1927 that there were 1,319,428 people on its rolls; in 1928 the same source reported the figure as 1,696,304. Most historians consider these figures fairly meaningless and suggest that they probably reflect creative bookkeeping on the part of regime bureaucrats, rather than the scale of genuine recruitment. Nonetheless, some scholars rely on some official figures from the time in specific local contexts, e.g. in the province of Almería the UP membership was estimated at 30,000, and in mid-size Valencian towns like Gandia, Torrent or Utiel, at 500–1,000.

A personal communication from Primo de Rivera, dated 1929, estimated membership at 600–700,000. Many historians tend to suggest smaller total figures, ranging from 400,000 to 500,000. These estimates are somewhat speculative, although some scholars have based their calculations on the circulation of the daily newspaper of the UP, La Nación, which at its peak reached 50,000 copies.

Figures in the 1.3m–1.7m range claimed by the party would imply a membership rate of some 6–8% of the entire Spanish population, while figures in the 400–500,000 range suggested by later scholars would put membership at around 2%. In comparison to other comparable parties of European fascist regimes, in the mid-1930s some 10% of the Italian population were on the rolls of the PNF, while in 1937 some 8% of Germans were members of the NSDAP. By way of comparison, the official state parties of European communist countries in the late 20th century recorded membership rates between 4% in the USSR and 8–10% in Poland and Czechoslovakia. In 1942, FET y de las JONS, the state party of the Francoist dictatorship, claimed around 900,000 members, or around 3% of the Spanish population.
