= Joaquín Beunza Redín =

Spanish politician (1872–1936)

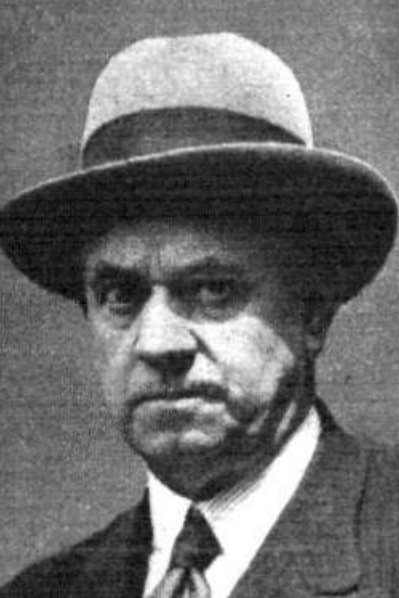
- Born: Joaquín Beunza Redín; 1872; Pamplona, Spain
- Died: 1936 (aged 63–64); Hondarribia, Spain
- Occupation: lawyer
- Known for: politician
- Political party: Carlism

Joaquín Beunza Redín (1872-1936) was a Spanish Carlist politician. His career climaxed in 1931–1933, when during one term he served as deputy to the Cortes; in 1909-1917 he was also member of Diputación Foral, the Navarrese self-government, and in 1901-1906 he formed part of the Pamplonese city council. He is best known for long-time efforts to preserve and broaden separate Navarrese legal establishments; he represented Pamplona in talks with Madrid during 1917-1919 negotiations on so-called reintegración foral, in 1924–1927 on so-called cupo and Convenio Económico, in 1930–1931 on Basque-Navarrese autonomy and in 1936 on separate Navarrese Carta Foral.

== Family and youth ==
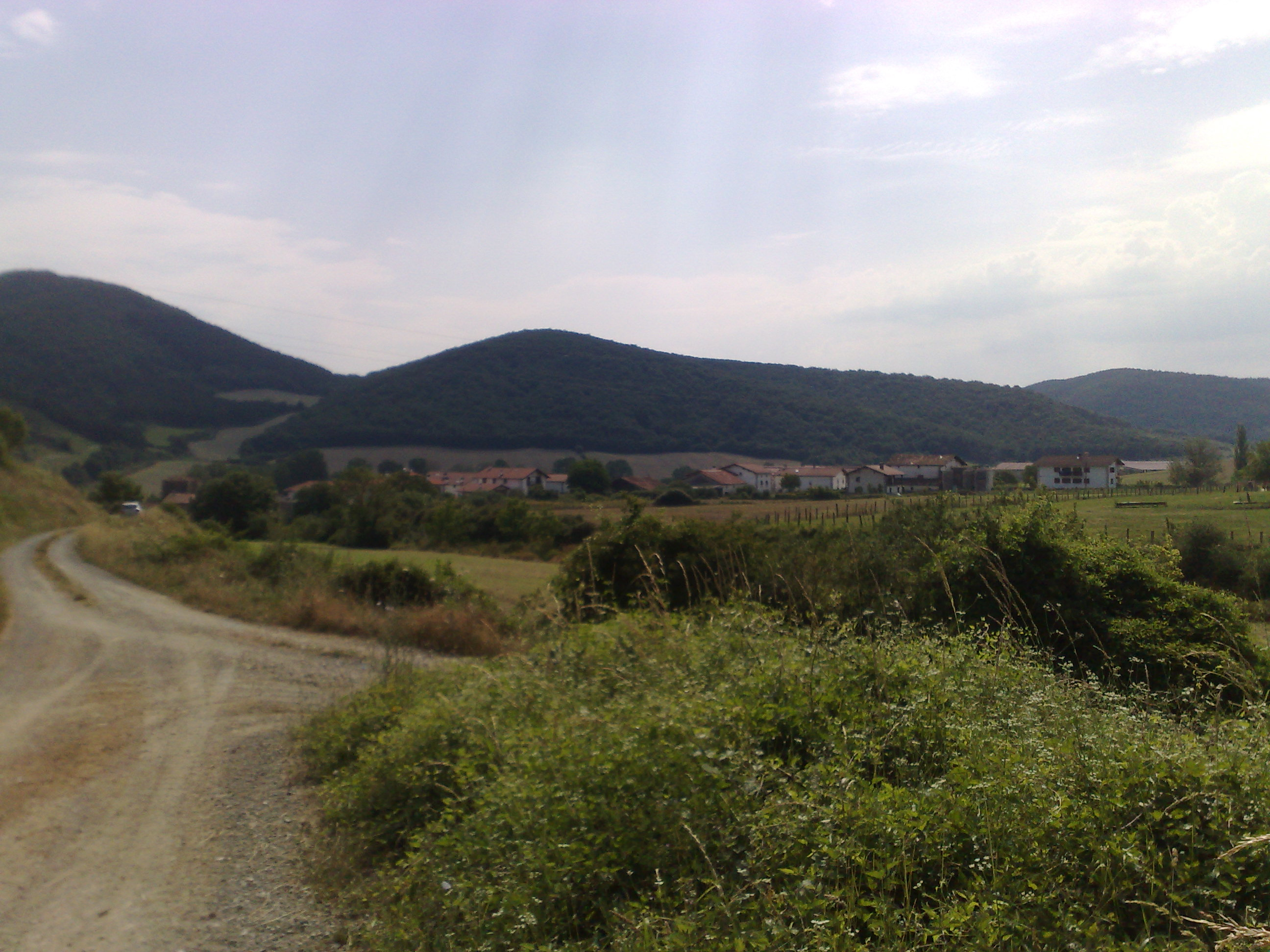
Ziaurritz, current view

The family reportedly originated from Beunza, a hamlet in mountainous area north of Pamplona; the surname became fairly popular in Navarre are somewhat less in Gipuzkoa. There were some distinguished Beunzas in Navarrese history, e.g. in the mid-18th century one served as procurador de los Tribunales Reales, but none of them can be traced as Joaquín's ancestor. The most distant one identified is his paternal grandfather, Joaquín Beunza Ezcurra; he originated from the village of Ziaurritz, few miles away from Beunza. At some point, he moved to Pamplona, where in 1844 he married Juliana Viguria Ibañez (1827-1891). It is not clear what he was doing for a living; the couple had at least 6 children. Their son and Joaquín's father, Fernando Ramón Beunza Viguria (1845-1894), was born in Pamplona. In 1871, he married a local girl, Juliana Josefa Redín Espinal (1844-1900); except names of the parents, there is close to nothing known about her.

In numerous sources, it is noted that Beunza originated from “familia campesina”, “familia modesta” or “humilde familia”. It seems that his father was a working-class horticultural employee, living and working in the then horticulture-focused Pamplonese suburb of Rochapea, even though obituary notes featured “Don Ramón Beunza y Viguria”. It is not clear how many children the couple had; except Joaquín, there is only one sister known. It was with great financial difficulty that in the mid-1880s he received secondary education in Instituto Provincial de Pamplona, gaining prizes for excellent results along the way. He obtained bachillerato with premio extraordinario, which in turn allowed him to enter the university. At least since the early 1890s Beunza was studying law in the University of Salamanca, though he registered also at economy courses. He was an excellent student, obtaining awards and representing the faculty in Madrid and abroad. He graduated in 1895 but continued studies in Madrid and – thanks to a grant – in Paris. In 1897 he was admitted to Colegio de Abogados in Pamplona and commenced practice, not clear in what office and what position. He specialized in derecho foral.

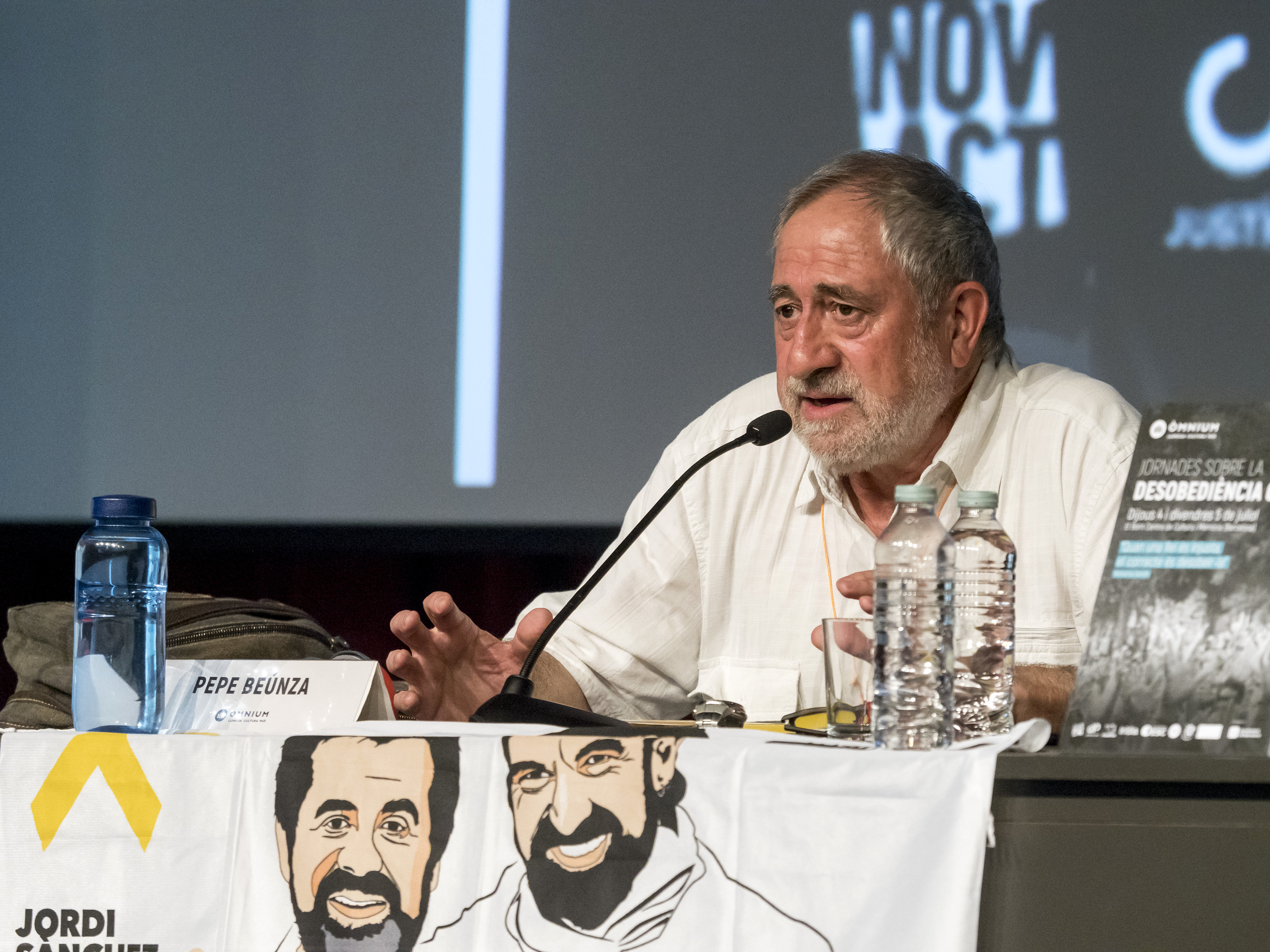
José Luis Beunza Vázquez, 2019

In 1900, Beunza married Asunción Sáez Oroquieta (?-1960), a girl from Pamplona. She was daughter to Domingo Sáez, a “conocido comerciante” of the city. The couple settled in Pamplona; they had at least 4 children, 2 sons and 2 daughters. None of them was a public figure. Both sons became lawyers, Domingo in Logroño and Daniel in Valencia. Both were Carlists; the latter first served in Navarrese wartime executive and then very briefly in Gipuzkoan FET command layer. He remained moderately active in Comunión Tradicionalista and in the 1960s, he advocated a firm anti-Francoist stand of the organisation; in 1975, he demanded that the Carlist claimant prince Carlos Hugo, suspected of deviating from Traditionalist orthodoxy, confirms the Carlist credo. The best-known Beunza's descendant is his grandson José Luis Beunza Vázquez, the first conscientious objector in Spain; his case made headlines of foreign press and he remains sort of celebrity until today.

== Early political career (1898-1909) ==
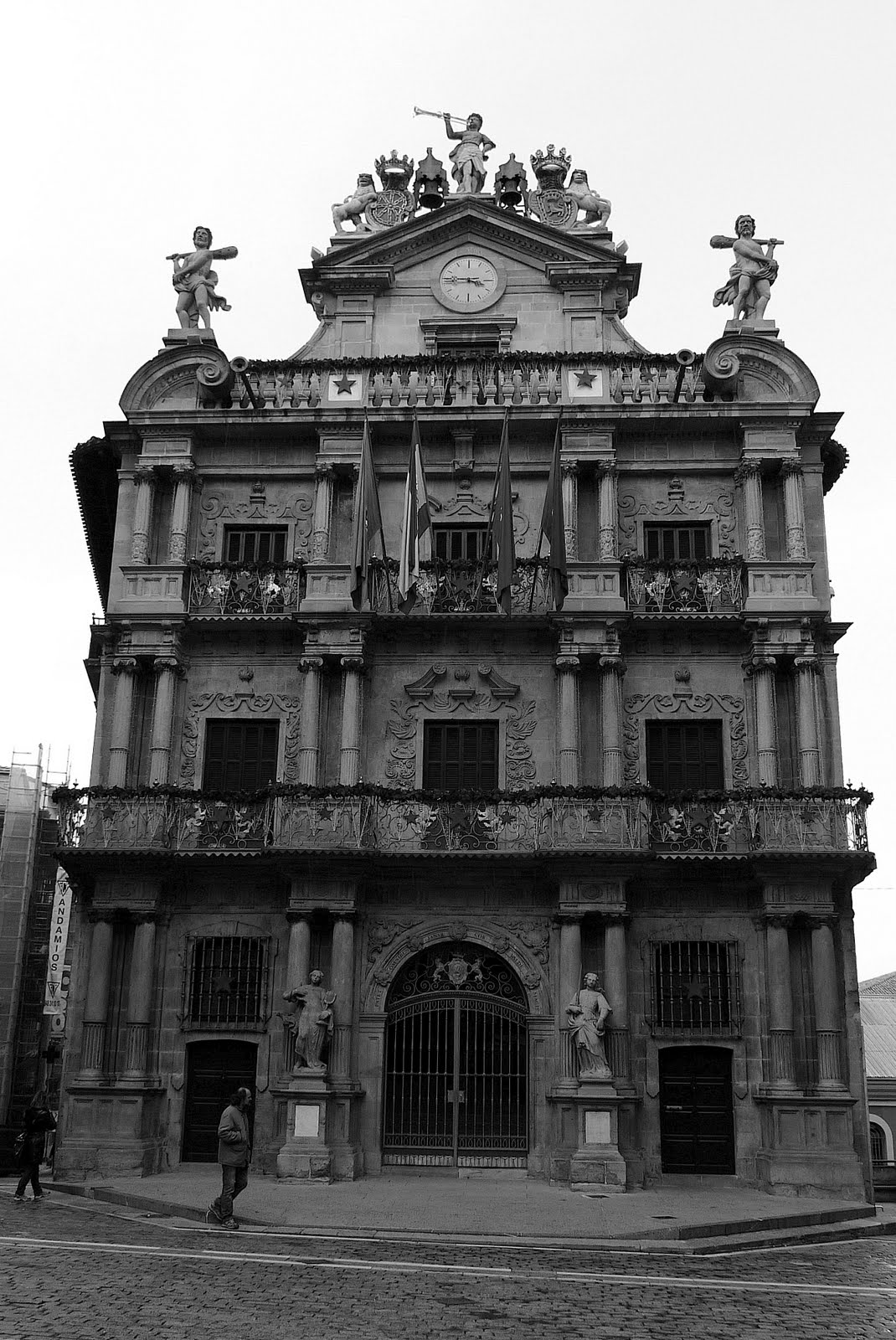
Pamplona town hall

Political preferences of Beunza's ancestors are not clear. His own became known in his mid-20s; in 1898, he was noted as member of the local Junta Directiva of Asociación de San Luis Gonzaga, a Catholic association which grouped young males. During the 1899 local elections, he was running to the town hall as a Carlist from the Pamplonese primer distrito, which included his native Rochapea; he was elected, but his competitors lodged a protest; eventually for unclear reason he was declared “incapacitado de ejercer el cargo de concejal” and his ticket was annulled. In 1901, Beunza once again stood in primer distrito, was successful and this time got his ticket confirmed.

Beunza's service in the ayuntamiento lasted 2 terms and 5 years, until 1906. Initially he acted as “regidor sindico”; since 1904, he was segundo teniente de alcalde, second deputy mayor. There is little known of his endeavours, though the result of some is visible until today: in 1904, he was within the faction which successfully opposed the plan to demolish the city walls. When approaching social question Beunza remained rather conservative. In 1902 he demanded that Federación Obrera did not go beyond defence of legitimate rights and did not advance socialism. During “crisis obrera” of 1905, he voiced against the project of launching municipal works; Beunza claimed that it was too broadly sketched (applicable to people either born in Pamplona, or married to Pamplonesa or with 2 years of residence in the city) and would attract masses of poor people, coming to the city. As a lawyer he was also delegated to take part in numerous lawsuits that the city was engaged in, e.g. in 1906 against a company named Finca de Arrobi. However, his position was far from established; in 1905 he failed in elections for compromisarios, e.g. electors entitled to elect senators from Navarre.

Carlist standard

It is not clear when Beunza's term in the town hall expired; in August 1906 he was already referred to as ex-consejal. Some sources count him already among “ricos propietarios”, yet there is no information on his alleged wealth. It is known that in 1902 he was in management of Sociedad Burlada y Belascoain, a small company running sort of minor spa and extracting mineral waters south of Pamplona, and that in 1907 he figured in Consejo de Administración of La Vasconia, an insurance company; he would remain in its board for almost 30 years to come. Within Carlism his position was moderate; during the 1907 elections to Diputación Provincial, the Navarrese self-governmental body, his role was limited to supporting the party candidate and the Carlist leader in Navarre Francisco Martínez Alsúa, who competed from the merindad of Estella.

== Diputado Foral (1909-1917) ==
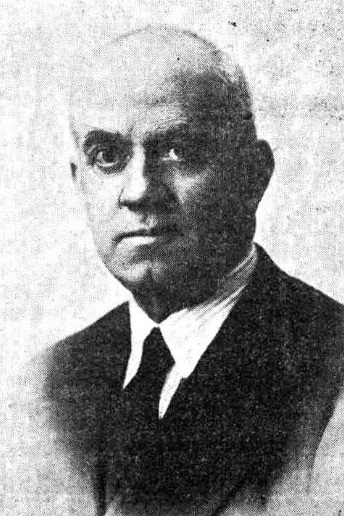
Beunza, 1910s

At the turn of the decades, the Navarrese politics was dominated by Carlism; Carlists held numerous local alcaldias, Cortes tickets and mandates in Diputación Foral. The latter, which consisted of 7 members, had a half of its members elected every 2 years. In 1909 elections Beunza had no counter-candidate and was voted into Diputación. Until 1912 the body was entirely controlled by the Carlists and there was little controversy recorded. Apart from purely procedural and ceremonial duties, Beunza was noted for efforts to construct a railway line from Pamplona via Leiza to Irún, supervision of education as member of junta provincial de instrucción, promotion of Basque language and support for local businesses. He was member of the body when in 1910 it adopted the Navas de Tolosa standard as the Navarrese emblem.

Beunza was comfortably re-elected to Diputación in 1913; the body was still totally controlled by the Carlists. However, partial 1915 elections produced their defeat and loosened the Traditionalist grip on self-government. At the time it was in conflict with the Madrid government; the issue was authority over local municipalities. Newly elected liberal members seized the opportunity. They declared that Diputación was an inoperative nest of Carlist caciquismo and produced a plan of major rehaul, which included formal rulebook of proceedings and making the sessions public (Navarre was the only one of 50 Spanish provinces with its diputación proceedings held behind close doors). Beunza took the lead when refuting their claims and declared proposed changes anti-foral. When the proposals were rejected, in 1916, liberal deputies resigned in protest. Despite meagre governmental efforts and demands from some ayuntamientos, Diputación managed to defend its modus operandi. However, the case produced major controversies in Navarre. It is not clear whether the turmoil was the reason why Beunza did not stand in the 1917 elections; in the spring his term expired.

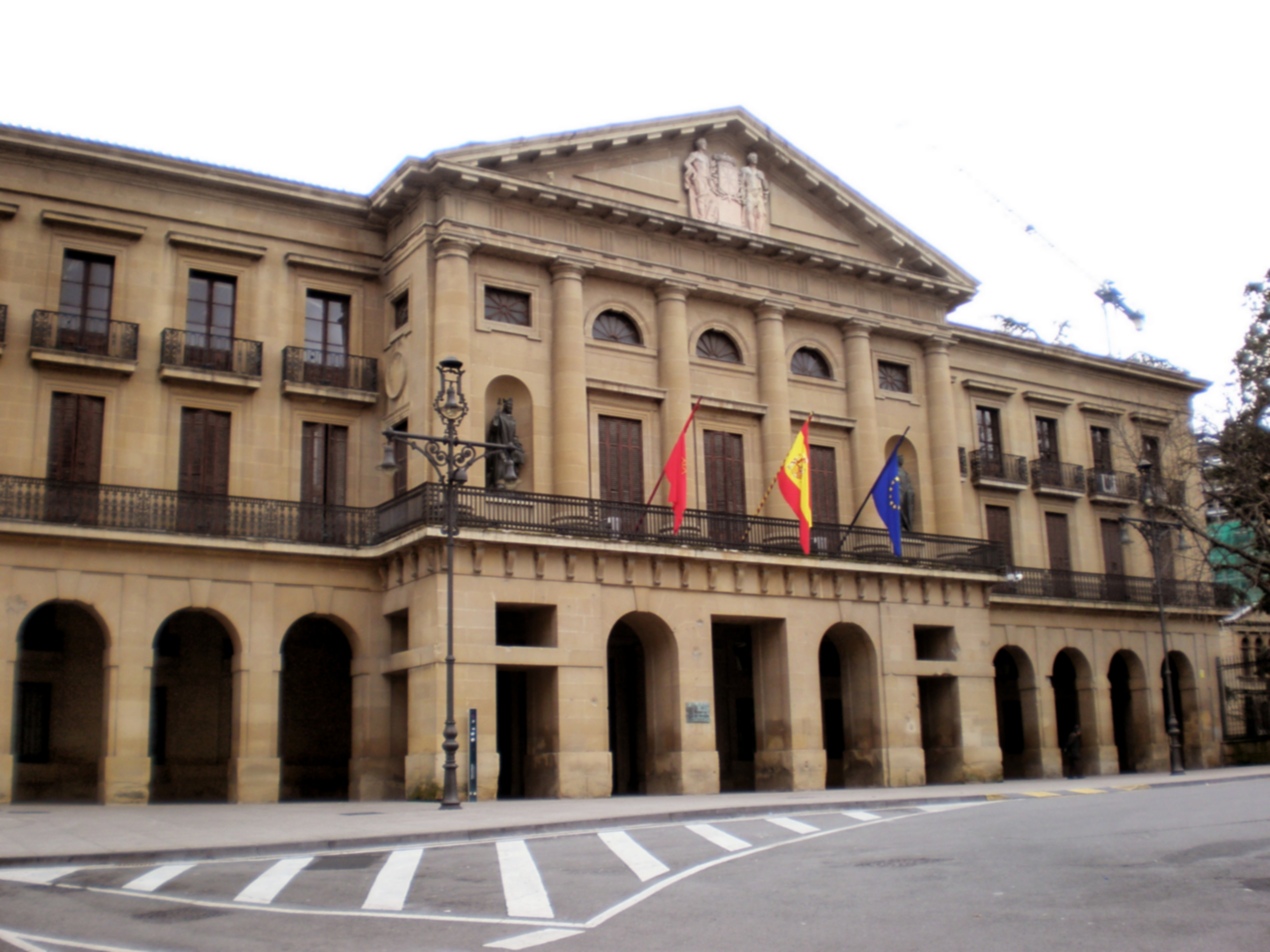
Diputacion site, Pamplona

In the party, Beunza was not particularly active. In the 1910s, he was secretario of Junta Regional; he welcomed party heavyweights like Juan Vázquez de Mella in Navarre, represented Carlism during various Catholic rallies, e.g. in 1912 against blasphemy, and in executive of provincial Junta de Defensa Católica. His declaration that “no hay más que dos partidos enamorados del ideal. El carlista y el republicano” triggered protests of mainstream press. He seldom published in local Traditionalist periodicals. However, he was far from sectarian. As a lawyer, he was involved in a civil lawsuit, related to religion. A priest admonished a boy, who refused to stand up while the former was leaving the church with a cross in front of him. The boy confronted the religious and was assisted by his parents, who during altercation followed the priest into the temple. Beunza defended the parents in court.

== Reintegración foral (1917-1923) ==
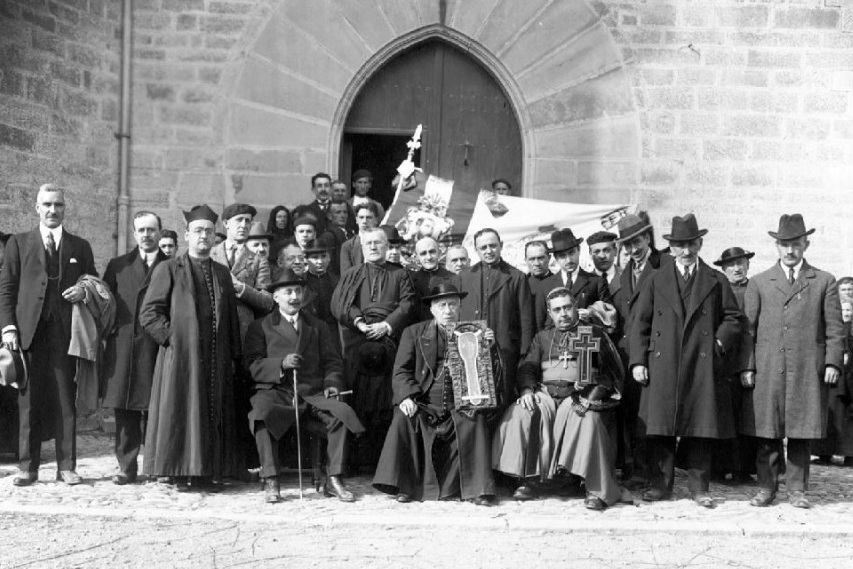
Beunza during a Navarrese ceremony in Javier, late 1910s

In mid-1917, three diputaciónes of Basque provinces followed the example of Catalonia and in a joint initiative demanded reintegración foral, return of old separate establishments, dismantled in course of the 19th century. At that time, Beunza was member of Consejo Foral Administrativo, an advisory body composed of representatives of local municipalities and appointees of the Navarrese self-government. He advocated the Navarrese access to the Basque initiative and “reintegración vasco-navarra armonizándola con los altos intereses de la Patria”, but Diputación limited themselves to non-committal letter of support. However, the issue gained enormous attention. In 1918, Beunza co-signed a non-party petition in support of full reintegracion foral and “armonizar ese derecho con la indiscutible unidad de España”; the Carlists underlined that Basque-Navarrese establishments should operate “dentro del Estado español y dentro de la unidad nacional”. During the 1919 Asamblea de Pamplona - with 400 ayuntamientos represented – he co-signed a motion demanding that Diputación appoints a commission to propose a new foral regime; he also joined Junta de Reintegración Foral, and was appointed to section focusing on future justice system. It seemed that major reform was behind the corner, but situation in Catalonia escalated, government introduced estado de guerra, then cabinet turmoil followed and the matter faded away. Beunza kept advising the diputación on local issues related to application of derecho foral, be it in case of Lerín in 1919 or Elizondo in 1922.

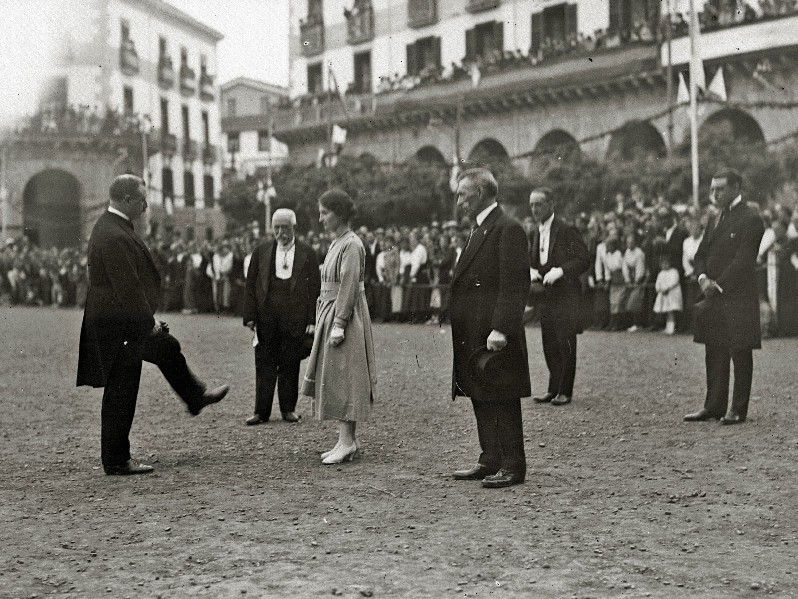
Sociedad de Estudios Vascos being founded, Oñate 1918

Apart from supporting separate legal Basque-Navarrese establishments, Beunza was involved also in works on build-up of Basque cultural-scientific infrastructure. In 1918, he was among the founding members of Sociedad de Estudios Vascos; during the following years he would take part in two SEV congresses yet his overall activity in the organisation was moderate. Within Navarrese Carlism he formed the faction which supported alliance with Basque nationalists. This stand became one of local threads of the conflict between the claimant Don Jaime and the chief theorist Vázquez de Mella; the disagreement matured since the mid-1910s and in principle, Beunza was not involved, apart from what looked like a pro-Mellista support for Spanish neutrality in the Great War. The conflict erupted in 1919; the chief vasco-navarrese Mellista, Víctor Pradera, declared that “los señores Beunza, Llorens y Arevalo son el alma de neojaimismo” up to the point of fanaticism, and apart from support for “cesarista” line they are to blame that “antiguo partido se intoxicó de un nacionalismo [i.e. Basque nationalism]”. When the movement broke into the Mellistas and the Jaimistas, Beunza sided with the latter. In 1919, he was rumoured to run for the Cortes His relations with the claimant were tense; he co-signed a letter which in ultimative tone demanded that “funesta y perjudicial” influence of Melgar, a Francophile adviser to Don Jaime, be reduced, and threatened with withdrawal into privacy.

== Dictatorship (1923-1931) ==
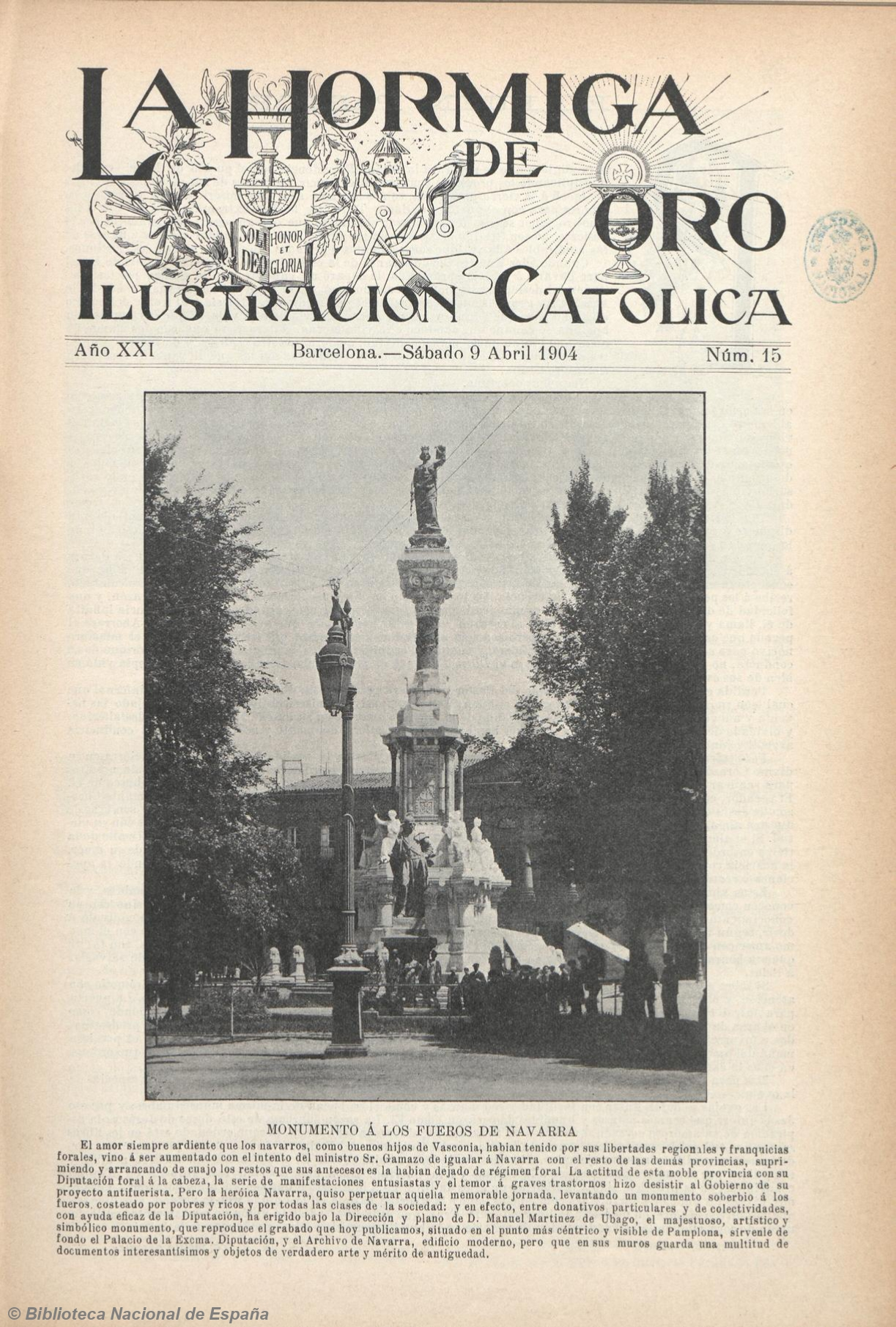
monument to fueros, Pamplona

The Primo de Rivera dictatorship embarked on self-government reform; in early 1924 the Directorio introduced new Estatuto Municipal. Its regulations were partially incompatible with Navarrese practice, mostly because they envisioned some Diputación competencies to be with municipal authorities. Beunza formed part of a legal team, sent by Diputación to Madrid to work out some compromise. It materialized as so-called Ley de Bases, which was then discussed by the Navarrese self-government and which Beunza again negotiated in Madrid in early 1925; eventually “armonización con nuestro regimen foral” has been declared. In 1926-1927 he was engaged in another controversy between Pamplona and Madrid; the finance minister Calvo Sotelo tried to raise so-called cupo, an annual financial contribution of Navarre to central budget. First as member of Consejo Foral Administrativo Beunza advised the Diputación on negotiation strategy, especially that Navarrese press made cupo a hotly debated issue. Then he remained engaged in talks, which ended up as a new Convenio Económico; scholars evaluate the outcome as fairly satisfactory for Navarre. The Diputación apparently agreed; in recognition of his merits, which included involvement in numerous other projects, in 1927 Beunza – at the time asesor of the Pamplona ayuntamiento – was declared hijo predilecto de Navarra.

Though Beunza tried to work out some modus vivendi with the dictatorship, none of the sources consulted claims he was personally involved in supporting it. He is missing on lists of prestigious Navarrese members of the primoderiverista state party, Unión Patriótica. According to later hostile press he was member of Comité de Homenaje a Primo de Rivera, but this information is not confirmed elsewhere. In the late 1920s he was involved in sketchy works on Basque establishments, discussed as part of regional legislation to be prepared by the quasi-parliament set up by Primo, Asamblea Nacional Consultiva. Apart from this, he remained engaged in religious activity and culture, giving lecture on at times unintuitive topics.

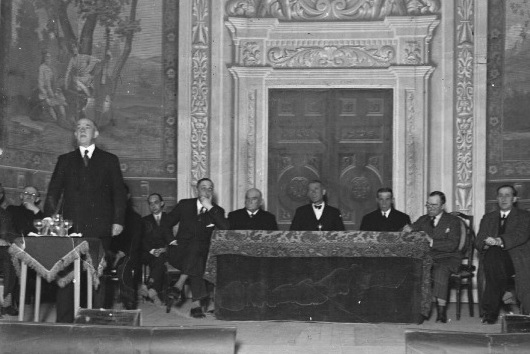
at Navarrese rally, March 1931

Following resignation of Primo and in anticipation of eminent change, in 1930 SEV resumed works on Basque-Navarrese autonomy. Beunza was first consulted and then invited to Comisión de Autonomía. Among detailed regulations suggested he voiced also in favour of ikurriña as “una expresión de la unidad espiritual de los vascos”. During Dictablanda also Carlism, dormant for the last few years, assumed more active stance. As representative of Navarre (with Rodezno) in June 1930 Beunza co-signed a nationwide Comunión Tradicionalista manifesto; locally he took part in Carlist rallies "Por la Religión, por la Monarquía Tradicional y por la Reintegración Foral", e.g. in March 1931 in Pamplona. In early 1931 it seemed that the government would soon organise general elections, to be followed by the local ones. In the press Beunza was listed as a likely Carlist candidate to the Cortes. He was referred to as “actualmente financista en Madrid” and apart from La Vasconia, was in executive boards of numerous other companies: Sociedad Navarra de Industrias, Banco Español de Paris, Hidráulica del Urederra and a few sugar plants.

== Estatuto de Estella (1931) ==
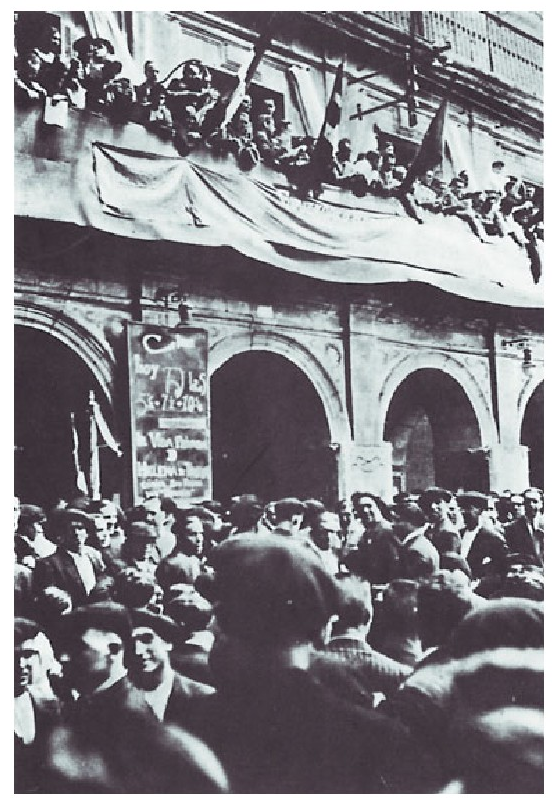
Estella, rally for Estatuto

Once Republic has been declared in May 1931 SEV sped up works on autonomy statute; as legal expert Beunza remained heavily engaged, especially that he entered the SEV Junta Permanente. He pronounced on many issues, e.g. claimed that 80 members of the future Consejo Vasco-Navarro was far too many or opted for a separate penal code for Navarre. He opposed definition of local electoral processes as “democratic” and claimed that every province of the future autonomous region should be free to decide its own way of nominating representatives to a common council. However, he also remained firmly in favour of Basque-Navarrese unity and during a grand meeting successfully lobbied to change every instance of “vasco” in the text to “vasco-navarro”. It is not clear whether he was present during a massive rally of town hall representatives in June 1931 in Estella, which slightly changed the SEV draft, yet he remained a staunch supporter of what became known as Estatuto de Estella.

Within Carlism there was no clear opinion on the autonomy issue; Beunza led the faction which supported it, and his followers were dubbed “beunzas”. During the electoral campaign to the Cortes in June 1931 he emerged as key personal link between the Carlists and the Basque nationalists, and it was largely thanks to his efforts that in 4 provinces the two formed common electoral lists. Beunza was running in Navarre. Apart from autonomous agenda, he advanced also the religious cause against the rising secular tide. Though usually moderate, during a rally in June he sounded particularly adamant; the Carlist manifesto aimed against secular legislation that he co-signed contained warning that in Navarre it would not be met “sin la mayor resistencia”, though it was noted that “dentro de los límites jurídicos”. Eventually he was comfortably elected, yet in Pamplona and in particular in his native Rochapea his results were far worse. The candidates elected formed a 15-member minority, named Minoría Vasco-Navarra. As one of its most experienced politicians and as a person respected in both groups, in July Beunza became the formal leader of the minority in the chamber.

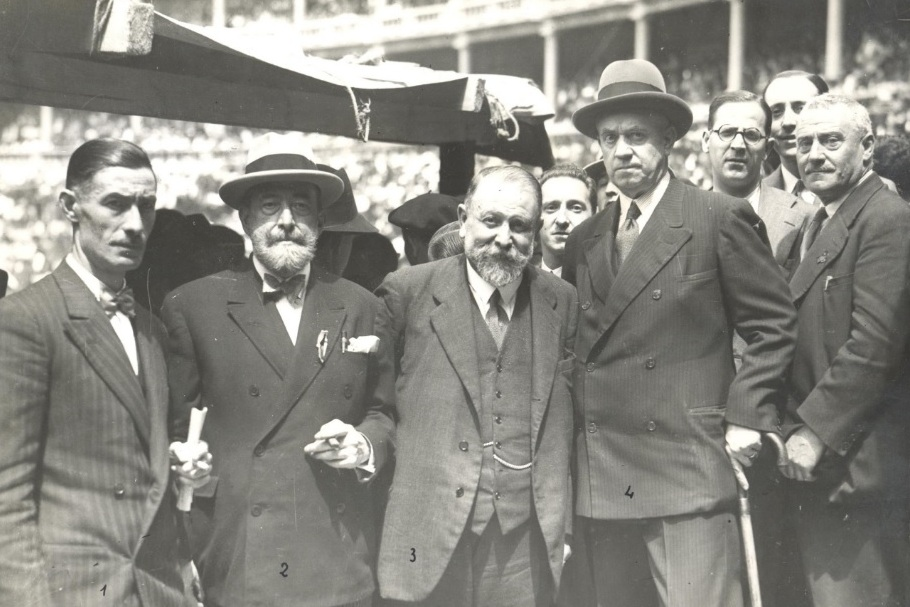
Beunza (2fR) among Carlist speakers in Pamplona, 1931

In the Cortes initially Beunza adopted a moderate posture. During his inaugural address in late July he admitted that the Catalan issue appeared more urgent than the Basque one and did not press the cause of autonomous statute. He merely asked that the regular ayuntamientos – in early days of the Republic replaced by appointed comisiones gestoras, the move he considered somehow justified given threat of revolutionary violence – be restored now that the situation stabilized. Beunza did not advance anti-Republican propaganda, though in August in name of Minoría Vasco-Navarra he voiced against exaltation of pro-republican Jaca rebels, executed during last days of the monarchy. In September 1931 – once Estatuto de Estella has been finalised – together with the nationalist leader José Antonio Aguirre and during a solemn ceremony, accompanied by some 400 alcaldes from Basque-Navarrese municipios, he handed the autonomy statute proposal to the then prime minister, Niceto Alcala-Zamora.

== Constitution (1931) ==
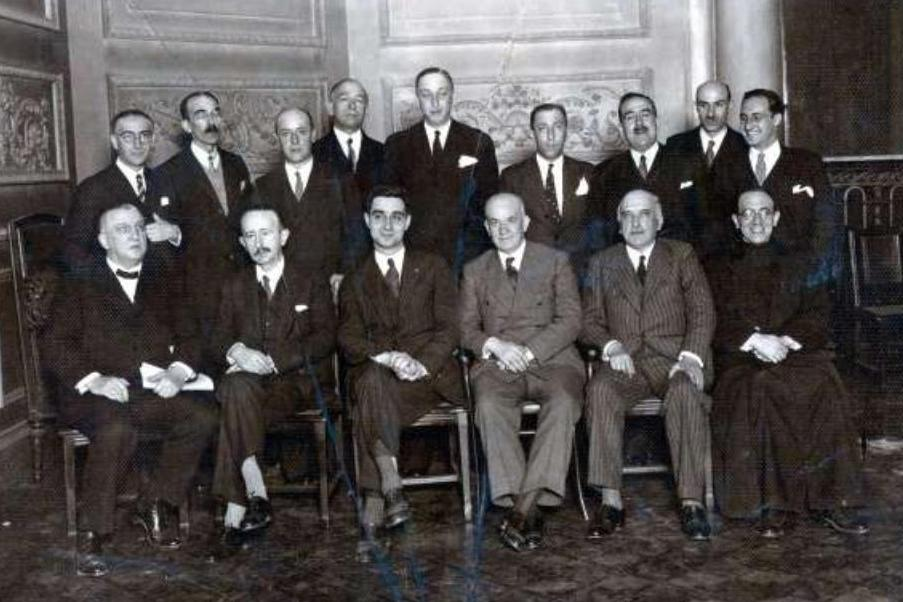
Beunza among members of Minoría Vasco-Navarra (sitting 3fR)

Estatuto de Estella was subject to parliamentary works in late September; Beunza due to his status of a lawyer specializing in derecho foral and the experience he gained in 1917-1919 and 1925–1927 in negotiations with central authorities was among chief advocates of the document. It soon turned out that its stipulations were not compatible with numerous paragraphs of the constitution draft, which was being discussed at the time. Beunza tried to bridge the gap, i.e. he co-signed a proposal of constitutional amendment which would allow “la federación de regiones autónomas que sean limítrofes”. It was rejected in the chamber and following barely two weeks, in late September the entire Estatuto de Estella draft was dismissed in the Cortes as non-constitutional.

Another major topic that Beunza discussed at length was religion. Initially he suggested that the new Republic focuses on social issues and puts religious ones on hold; it was when responding to him that in October Manuel Azaña uttered his famous “Spain ceased to be Catholic”. Apart from protests against what he perceived as persecution of the church he criticised the constitutional draft as it specified no state religion; the Minoría even tried parliamentary obstruction to prevent adopting the paragraph in question. In legislative commission he recorded numerous “votos particulares”. When together with other members of the minority he was ironically dubbed "vasco-romano-cavernicola" he declared accepting with pride the term "Basque-Roman", claimed that Republic was making a problem of religion while in fact there was none, and kept asking why severe measures were applied against economic activity of religious orders, while e.g. socialist Casas del Pueblo also owned land.

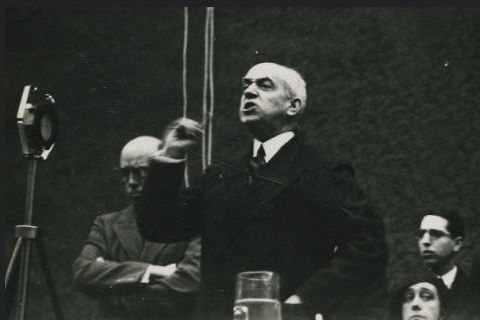
speaking, 1931

During late autumn of 1931 Beunza was getting increasingly disappointed with the emerging republican regime, not only due to rejection of Estatuto de Estella, but also because of what he perceived as militantly sectarian secularism, imposing its ideas over the Catholic masses. A scholar writes about “his parliamentary correctness deserting him” when Beunza concluded one of the addresses with what might have been interpreted as threat of violence in name of “dignity of free men against tyranny”, since “our defence will meet aggression wherever it strikes”. During a rally in November “Joaquín Beunza, a far from extreme Carlist, thundered to an audience of 22,000 people” that the Catholics should defend their rights by all means, legal or not, and declared the Cortes a zoo. Though in some other issues he supported innovative legislation – e.g. he argued in favour of female vote - the government considered the Basque-Carlist alliance a dangerous one and the minister of interior Casares Quiroga informed Beunza that all their rallies were suspended. In December the Cortes adopted the constitution, which included most articles earlier challenged by the right.

== Collapse of Basque-Navarrese autonomy (1932-1933) ==
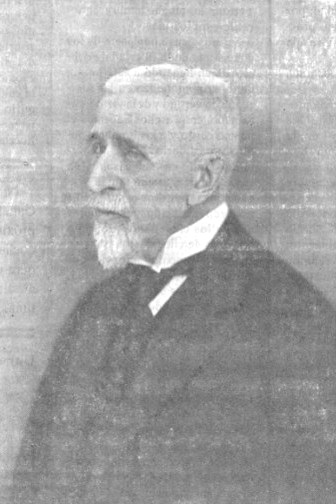
claimant Alfonso Carlos

In early 1932 Beunza's political engagements were twofold. On the one hand, he mobilised support against secular republican course. As in January 1932 the claimant Alfonso Carlos appointed him to the Carlist Junta Suprema he was touring the country far beyond Navarre. In January he was in Burriana; with a lecture ¿Ha dejado España de ser católica? he tackled the already notorious Azaña's phrase. In March he spoke in Barcelona, and in April he took part in Semana Tradicionalista in Seville, where he claimed that the Church should receive back the estates expropriated in the 19th century. On the other hand, he kept advocating the Basque-Navarrese autonomy, even though the new draft was being prepared by comisiones gestoras of the 4 provinces. He had little influence over them, and tried to get the project channelled via parliamentarians from Vascongadas and Navarre, but to no avail. Once the draft, known as Estatuto de las Gestoras, was ready, Beunza voiced in favour, even though at this point most hitherto favourable Carlists withdrew their support. Among the Basque nationalists he was considered the most tractable Carlist and PNV tried to use his influence in Comunión Tradicionalista accordingly. It all went to nothing; in June 1932 representatives of local Navarrese councils rejected the Gestoras draft.

Beunza was devastated by Navarre opting out of the joint autonomy scheme. Since he was its staunch advocate, he concluded that he no longer represented the Navarrese vox populi. He wrote a letter to José Sanchez Marco, president of the electoral Junta Católico-Fuerista, and declared his resignation from the Cortes. The matter remained in suspense, but eventually JCF did not accept his departure and Beunza continued to serve. However, at this point Minoría Vasco-Navarra became a fiction, as PNV lost any interest in co-operation with the Carlists and considered the alliance practically over. Present-day historians tend to agree.

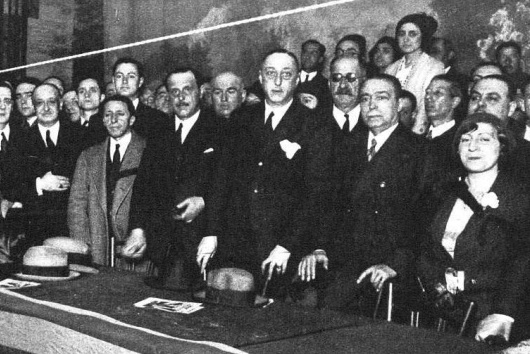
during Carlist meeting, 1932

Increasingly disappointed with sectarian left-dominated Cortes, Beunza was losing faith in parliamentary debates; in relation to debate on the Jesuit order he declared that opposition in the chamber was a waste of time. However, as late as in December 1932 he still hoped that during next elections the right – if standing jointly on basis of Catholic unity – might get some 100 MPs and become a sizeable minority to be reckoned with. In 1933 he was noted mostly as participant in various Carlist rallies, be it in Navarre or beyond. He kept supporting Estatuto de las Gestoras as drafted for 3 Basque provinces only, even though he had no influence over its contents. Formally he still remained jefe de Minoría Vasco-Navarra and this is how he was referred to in the press. In May he again renounced his parliamentary ticket, this time “por incompatibilidad” with being in executive of Compañía del Norte, partially state-owned major railway company; however, there is no information on his mandate having expired. When the chamber was dissolved in October, as formal leader of the parliamentary group Beunza formed part of Diputación Permanente of the Cortes.

== Estatuto Navarro (1934-1936) ==
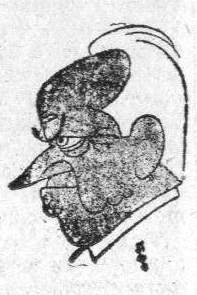
in caricature

Beunza did not stand in general elections of November 1933 and it looked like he was gradually gearing down for retirement, e.g. in 1934 he vacated the seat in Junta Permanente of SEV and resigned long-held post in executive of La Vasconia. He still practiced as a lawyer, running offices in Pamplona and Madrid. He remained a prestigious local figure, kept providing legal advice to various Navarrese bodies and was being admitted by the civil governor. However, within Carlism he remained merely a local politician of older generation and did not hold a seat in either national or provincial jefatura. By Basque nationalists he was viewed as a spent force, and their hardline papers counted Beunza among these who “traicionaron a su pueblo”.

Beunza did not abandon the hope of getting separate regional establishments restored or introduced. In a series of lectures, delivered between March and May 1935 in the Pamplonese Ateneo, he recommended a piecemeal strategy, to “solicitar enseñanza, legislación civil, justicia, política agraria, legislación social y otras varias facultades”. He did not seem attached to any particular formula – be it reintegración foral, autonomy or federation – and claimed that any solution might do given it is supported by population, acceptable constitutionally, and constitutes a step forward. To maintain mobilisation, he launched the idea that every year Navarre celebrates Dia de los Fueros.

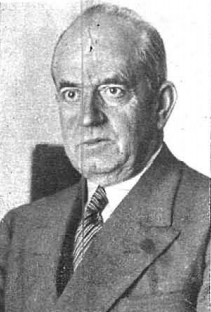
Beunza, 1930s

In 1935 the Navarrese Comisión Gestora was replaced by Diputación, the first one elected during the republican era. In early 1936 the new self-government restored Consejo Foral Administrativo and appointed Beunza as its member. Some members of CFA – Beunza and numerous Carlists included - floated the idea of Navarre as an autonomous region, though 3 other groups opposed the project: some (La Voz de Navarra) viewed it as impediment on path towards a future joint Basque-Navarrese autonomy, some (Frente Popular Navarro) were anxious that left-wing forces in the province would be left on their own, and some (Diario de Navarra) perceived it as incompatible with genuine fueros. Eventually supporters of the project prevailed and in May 1936 Beunza – among 3 other representatives – was once again sent to the capital to mediate between Pamplona and Madrid.

As both asesor jurídico (legal advisor) to Consejo Foral and negotiator between Pamplona and Madrid Beunza tried to keep two options open: Navarre joining the future autonomous Vascongadas (as its already advanced draft allowed such possibility) or Navarre having its own autonomous status. In May and June and as “Miguel Ramón” in El Pensamiento Navarro he engaged in polemics with Eladio Esparza; he adopted a very pragmatic approach and advocated any tangible step forward, even if the future solution turns to be “especie de fuero reducido o disminuido”. Unlike Esparza he tended to accept the 1931 constitution as a point of departure and – despite traditional fuerista stand – was prepared to see the future Carta Foral as a pact between Navarre and the central government. Until mid-July 1936 talks on Navarrese statute did not reach a meaningful stage.

== Last weeks (1936) ==
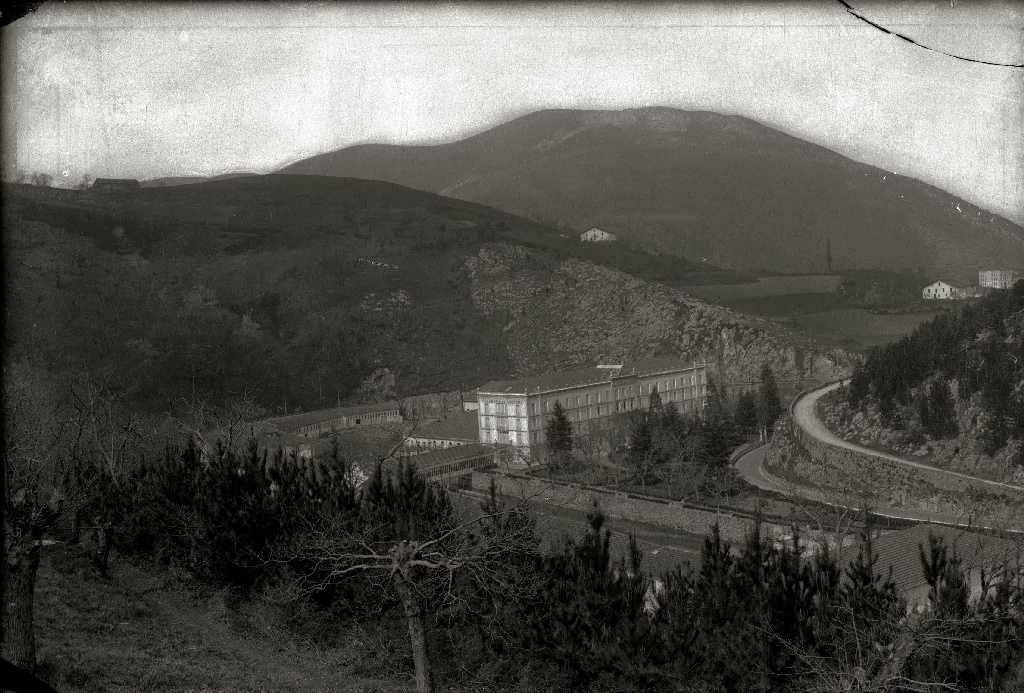
Cestona spa

Beunza took part in Carlist electoral campaign prior to the February 1936 general elections, during Traditionalist rallies speaking in favour of party candidates both in Pamplona and in minor locations like Viana. Most sources consulted provide no information whether he was involved or even aware of Carlist conspiracy; one claims the Comunión Tradicionalista executive did not inform him about gear-up to insurgency. As was his habit during the summer period, in early July he suspended his law practice and moved to Cestona, a small spa in Gipuzkoa which he frequented since the 1910s. In Gipuzkoa the coup failed, and the province was soon engulfed in revolutionary violence. On 23 July an unidentified patrol of militiamen detained Beunza in Cestona; he was transported to the Ondarreta prison in San Sebastián.

There are various unconfirmed news about Beunza's fate in captivity. Reportedly Manuel Irujo, one of PNV leaders and personal friend of Beunza, having learnt about his fate first saved him from immediate execution during his first hours in Ondarreta, and then tried to help Beunza afterwards. Some time in August certain groupings within the Republican conglomerate in Gipuzkoa, possibly the Communists, tried to arrange a prisoner exchange; Beunza and some other captives were to be swooped for some PCE prisoners in Nationalist captivity. Allegedly confidential talks were going on well until general Mola got wind of the plan and cancelled it. On the other hand, a somewhat contradictory information is that in August Junta Central Carlista de Guerra de Navarra – unaware of Beunza's captivity – appointed him among experts to work out a scheme of reintegración foral in the future, new Spain.

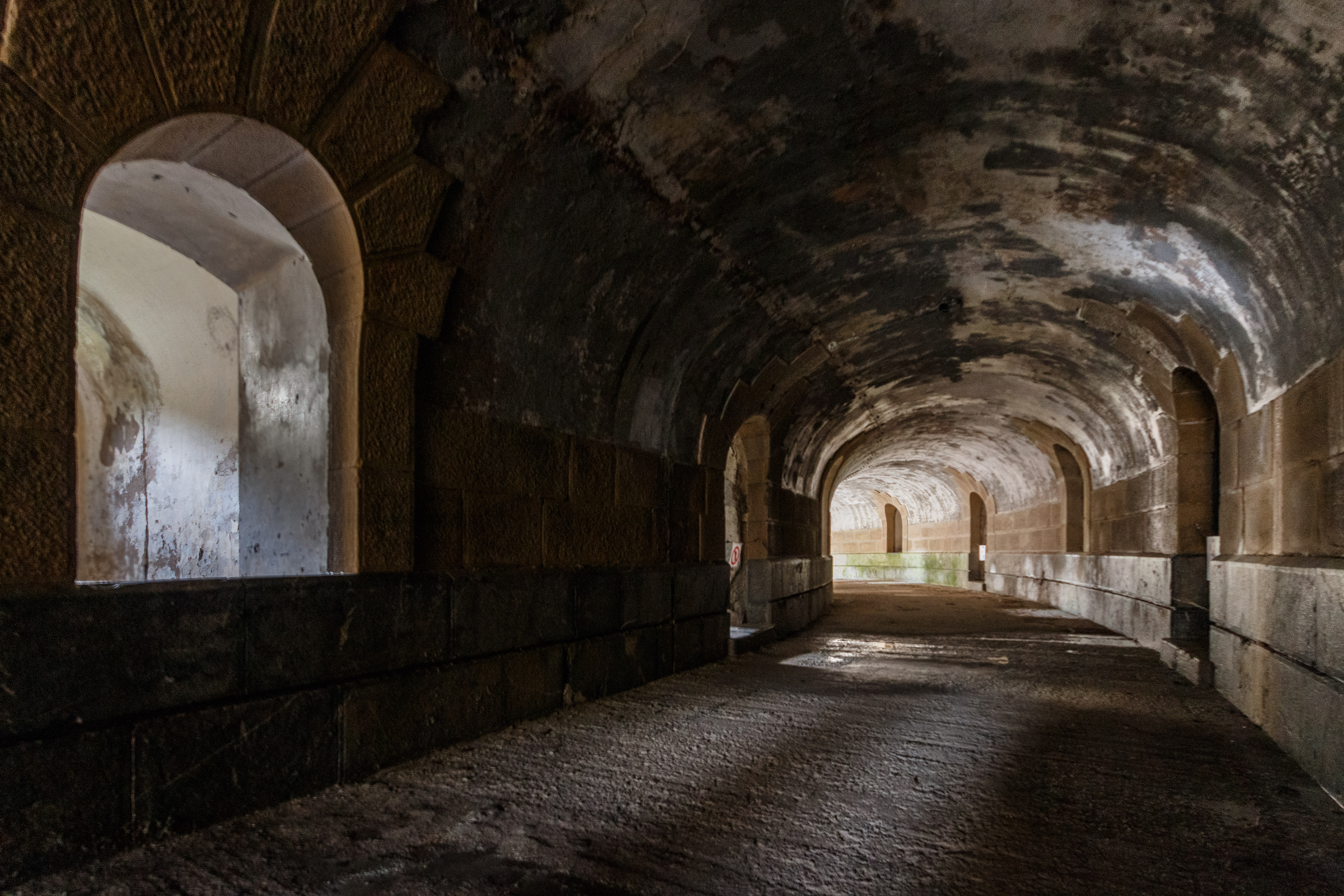
tunnel in Fuerte Guadalupe

At unspecified time the CNT militiamen transported most prisoners from Ondarreta to the fortress of Guadalupe in nearby Hondarribia. One source claims that in Guadalupe his captors offered Beunza freedom in exchange for money, the proposal he allegedly turned down. On 4 September, when Carlist troops were already fighting at the outskirts of Hondarribia, Beunza was called out for execution. According to eye-witness who survived the carnage, he tried to explain to militiamen that he was merely a lawyer, the declaration greeted with the derisive “tanto gusto en conocerte”. The rosary he always carried on him was taken away and he was allowed 15 minutes to write a message to his family. Then, when escorted through a tunnel running across the fortification, he was machine-gunned with a series of bullets; his corpse was reportedly “impossible to look at”. Two days later Nationalist troops seized Hondarribia. On 8 September Beunza's corpse was placed to lie in state in Palacio de la Diputación in Pamplona and then was buried during a solemn ceremony. His killers have never been identified.

== See also ==
- Carlism
- Statute of Autonomy of the Basque Country of 1936
- Fueros of Navarre
