= Marcelino Oreja Elósegui =

Spanish entrepreneur, activist and politician (1894–1934)

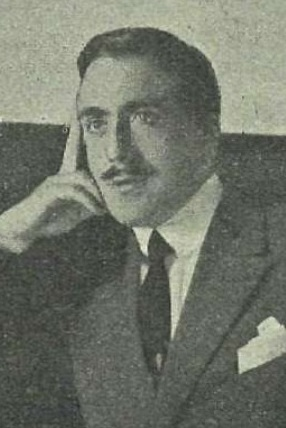
- Born: Marcelino Oreja Elósegui; 1894; Ibarrangelu
- Died: 1934 (aged 39–40); Mondragón
- Occupation: civil engineer
- Known for: politician
- Political party: Carlism

Marcelino Oreja Elósegui (1894–1934) was a Spanish entrepreneur, Catholic activist and Carlist politician.

== Family and youth ==
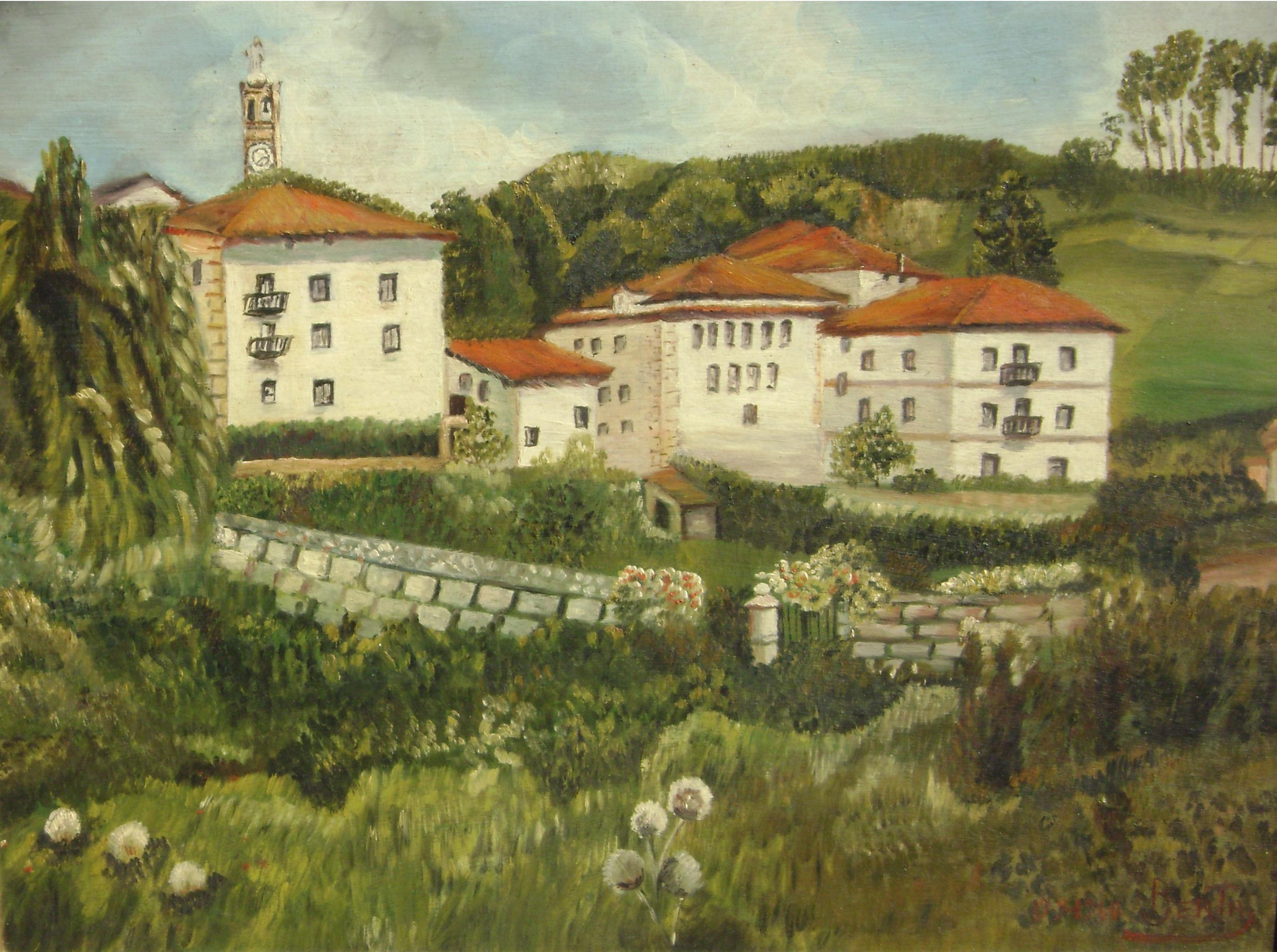
Ibarrangelu

Marcelino Oreja Elósegui was descendant to a petty bourgeoisie Basque family, originating from the Gipuzkoan town of Orexa. His paternal grandfather was a physician. His father, Basilio Oreja Echaniz, settled in the Biscay Ibarrangelu and since the late 1870s also practiced as a doctor, in the early 20th century briefly serving also as a mayor. Marcelino's mother, Cecilia Elósegui Ayala, came from a distinguished and much branched Gipuzkoan family. His older brothers were active in the Vascongadas branch of Carlism during the late Restoration period already. Basilio died early. Benigno made his name as a physician and one of urology pioneers in Gipuzkoa. Ricardo became one of the Gipuzkoan party leaders; he was elected to the Cortes in 1920 and 1923, during the Primo de Rivera dictatorship serving as gobernador civil of the Santander province. Both were members of the Francoist Cortes in the 1950s and 1960s.

Marcelino Oreja was born to his parents rather late, much junior than his older brothers, and was brought up in a militantly Catholic ambience. He studied civil engineering and graduated as ingeniero de caminos, canales y puertos, in 1925 nominated “ingeniero en practicas”. He married Purificación Aguirre Isasi, descendant to a well-to-do Gipuzkoan family. Her father, Toribio Aguirre Ibarzabal, served as a Traditionalist officer during the Third Carlist War. He became a member of new Basque industrial elites as co-founder, one of major shareholders and directing manager of the metalworking company Union Cerrajera. The posthumous son of Marcelino and Purificación, Marcelino Oreja Aguirre, was a Francoist diplomat and later Christian-Democrat politician; in 2010 Juan Carlos de Borbon made him marquis of Oreja. His son and the grandson of Marcelino, Marcelino Oreja Arburúa, is a Partido Popular politician and in 2002-2004 served in the European Parliament. Another grandson of Marcelino Oreja, Jaime Mayor Oreja, also a PP politician, held various high official jobs in the Basque Country, served in the Cortes in 1996-2001 and in the European Parliament in 2004-2014.

== Catholic activist ==
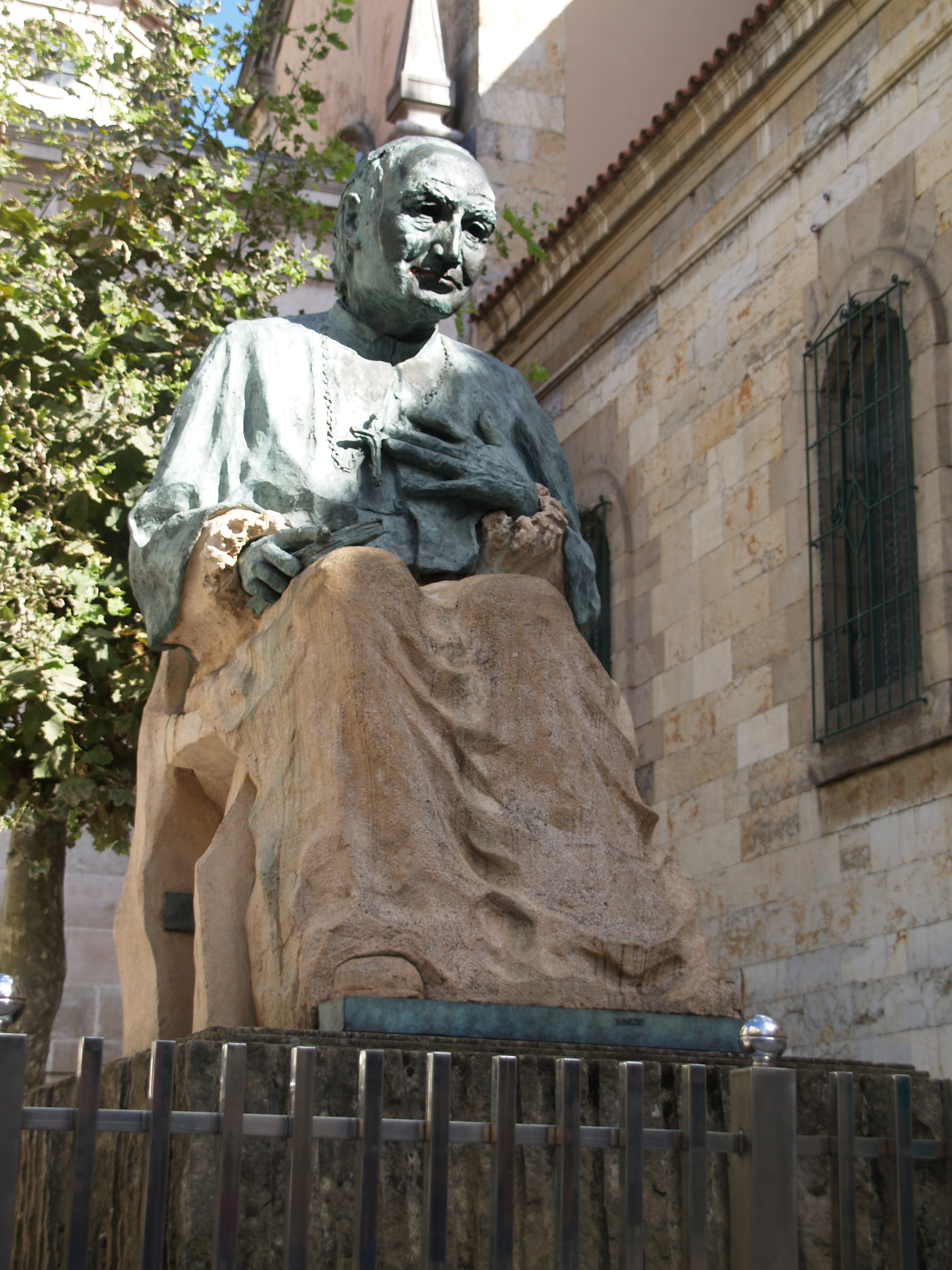
Angel Herrera Oria

Profoundly religious though falling short of exalted religiosity, Oreja commenced his public activity during the academic period in the very last years of the Restoration era. In early 1920 he entered Asociación Católica Nacional de Propagandistas, the lay Catholics organization founded back in 1909. Seconded by ACNdP, later that year he commenced work on launching a conservative academic union, Asociación Nacional de Estudiantes Católicos Españoles, set up and confederated with Confederación Internacional de Estudiantes Católicos. Based in Madrid, Oreja emerged as number two in the organization, becoming its secretary general; he is credited for “inflammatory harangues, opposing secularism in education and advocating Catholic integrity as an academic foundation. Some time afterwards, still acting on ACNdP initiative, he went on to build another Christian youth organization, Juventud Católica Española, somewhat broader in scope than CEC and more tied up with the parochial network. In 1924 Oreja entered its first Comisión Ejecutiva and became member of the propaganda section, travelling extensively across Spain, organizing JCE structures and taking part in various congresses, described as “vibrant and effusive” speaker.

NYT newsroom

In 1925 Oreja joined the ACNdP executive, nominated consejero nacional of the organization and rising to one of its key figures, on friendly terms with Angel Herrera Oria. In the mid-1920s Herrera dispatched him to the United States, the key purpose having been management training. Oreja enrolled at Columbia University, studying administration and journalism; he was also gaining hands-on familiarity with top American newspapers, collaborating with Boston Globe and New York Times. He remained in the US for two years. Upon his return, Oreja praised efficiency of modern American Catholic organizations like Caballeros de Colón and warned against the Jewish influence in the US. Back in Spain, ACNdP seconded him to El Debate, a dynamic daily owned by a controlled publishing house, Editorial Católica; Oreja entered the executive board and became its manager. He is credited for setting up an affiliated journalism school, renovating linotype infrastructure, introducing new techniques of editing and innovative advertising strategies.

== Manager ==
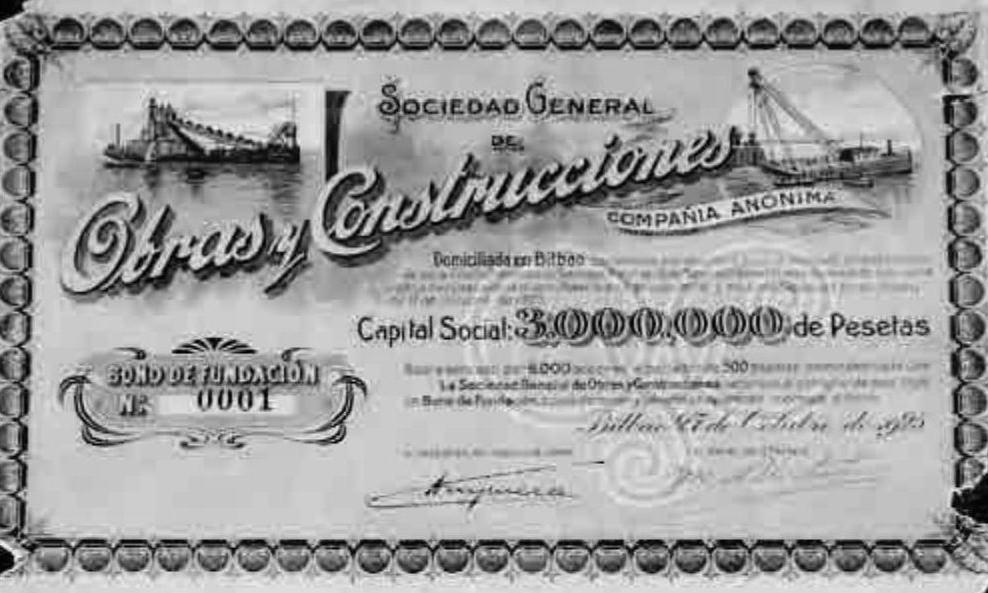
Obrascón bond

In the late 1920s Oreja had to leave Madrid due to family reasons and returned to the Vascongadas; instead of his home Biscay he settled in Gipuzkoa, moving into the family estate of his wife in Mondragón. In 1927 he commenced business activity related to his vocation as an engineer, becoming a manager of Vidrieras Españolas, a Bilbao-based glass and mirror company. In 1928 he set up his own enterprise, Agromán, specializing in construction work and gaining governmental contracts. In 1929 he became secretary of Consejo Administracion of Obrascón, a Bilbao construction agglomerate co-managed by a Carlist politician José Joaquín de Ampuero y del Río, also favored during the Primo de Rivera dictatorship. In early 1930s Marcelino Oreja succeeded his father-in-law as managing director of Unión Cerrajera, at that time somewhat of a hybrid between a typical joint-stock company and a cooperative. Some authors claim that during his term Oreja transformed Union into one of the greatest Biscay businesses, the others acknowledge its dynamics with some 1,500 employees, but do not credit Oreja for its growth.

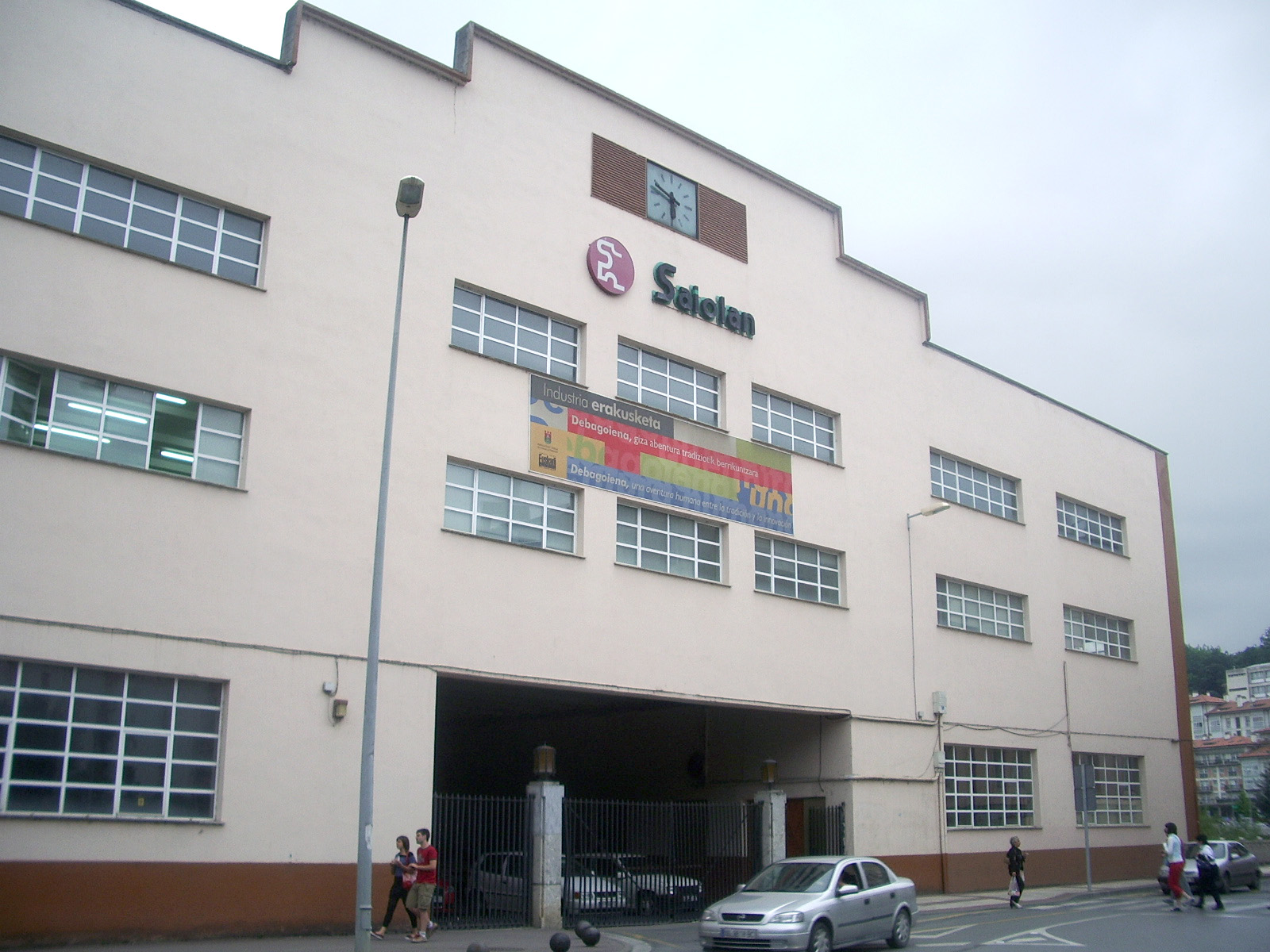
Union Cerrajera main building

Oreja represented a new breed of managers, attempting to defuse social conflict with a social-Catholic mixture of papal teachings of Leo XIII and traditionalist corporativism of Juan Vázquez de Mella. To promote this vision he co-founded Agrupación Vasca de Acción Social Cristiana in 1931, though he was able to test its feasibility at Union Cerrajera. As a manager he remained attentive to questions of workplace safety, social insurance and education; in 1933 he drafted the statute of Hermandad de Trabajadores de Unión Cerrajera, a Catholic trade union eventually set up after his death. However, he was vehemently hostile to competitive visions of labor relations, denouncing both Fascism and Marxism. Having developed a reputation for being authoritarian, he was considered prime enemy by the local UGT branch, especially that Oreja pledged never to employ a socialist or an anarchist, a statement which might be indicative of both his corporativist and Basque leanings.

== Politician ==
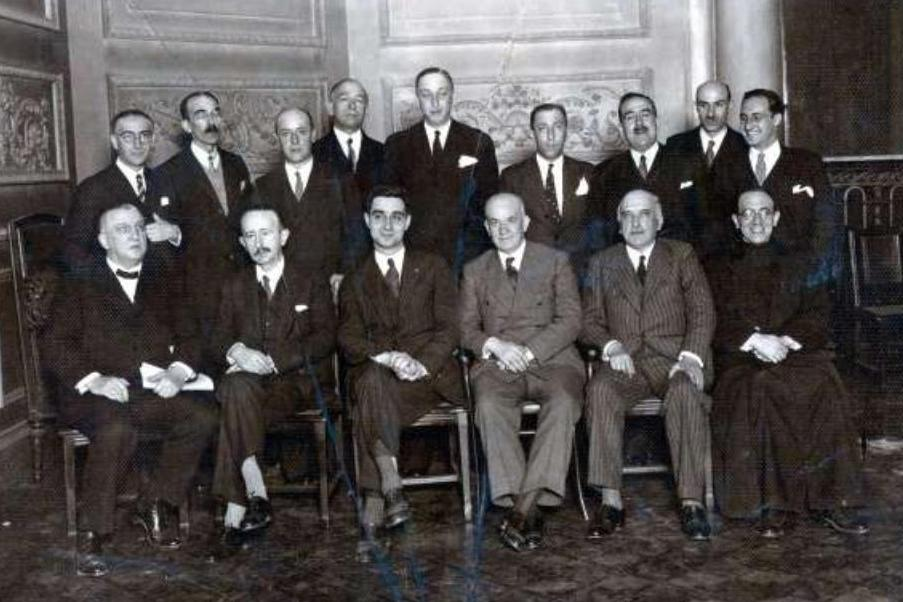
Oreja in Basque-Carlist minority

Following in footsteps of his older brothers, as a teenager Oreja was active in local Carlist structures; together with Ricardo and Benigno he defected to the secessionist Mellist branch of Traditionalism in 1919. After the Primo de Rivera coup he engaged in collaboration with the regime, though its nature remains unspecified. During the dictablanda period he came out with his first major proposal, presented to the orphaned primoderiveristas: instead of building a successor to Union Patriotica, named Union Monarquica Nacional, he suggested to build a social-Catholic confederation of regionalist movements across Spain. These plans were cancelled by fall of the monarchy and proclamation of the republic. In the early 1930s Oreja already emerged as one of the Basque Right leaders.

During the first republican electoral campaign of 1931 Oreja, still representing the mellistas, forged an alliance with PNV and mainstream Carlism. It eventually materialized in Vascongadas and Navarre as lista catolico-fuerista, with Oreja elected as its deputy from the rural Biscay district. During his first term as a deputy he dedicated himself to the Basque-Navarrese autonomy, approached not as a tactical necessity, but as a matter of principle. He contributed to the so-called Estella Statute and kept supporting autonomous regulations even when the government-imposed draft moved religious issues from regional to central portfolio. Another thread of his parliamentary activity – often merged with the Basque cause - was opposing secularization motions of the Left and backing the Church, especially trying to preserve its education infrastructure.

Carlist standard

Supporting reunification of Carlism in 1932 Oreja joined its united organization, Comunión Tradicionalista, though he remained relatively lukewarm to dynastical issues and supported broad monarchical alliances on national or regional basis. He was heading the Biscay section of Requeté, a rapidly growing Carlist paramilitary militia. He successfully represented the party during the 1933 electoral campaign to the Cortes, again standing in the Biscay province and again in alliance with PNV. As late as November 1933 he still advocated the apparently doomed autonomy “contra viento y marea”, which, however, did not amount to endorsing Basque nationalism or Basque separatism. Some scholars oppose him to “integristas” in the autonomy discourse.

During the revolution of 1934, the tension in Mondragon was running high. Oreja was arrested in his home by socialist militiamen, reportedly employees of the company he managed. Following a brief detention, he was shot dead.

== Legacy ==
Oreja was the best known single victim of the 1934 revolution in Spain, as no other parliamentary deputy was killed during the turmoil. His death has long reverberated in the national public debate. The Right presented it as a proof of barbarian and Bolshevik nature of the Left, a prefiguration of the future bloody terror, to be imposed by the mass workers’ movements. For the Carlists, Oreja became another of their martyrs; the following year he was already honored during Fiesta de los Mártires de la Tradición, the feast dedicated to the fallen Carlists and observed every March from 1895. In the Francoist Spain many streets have been named after him. Today “calle Marcelino Oreja” exists, among other places, in Bilbao and Mislata.

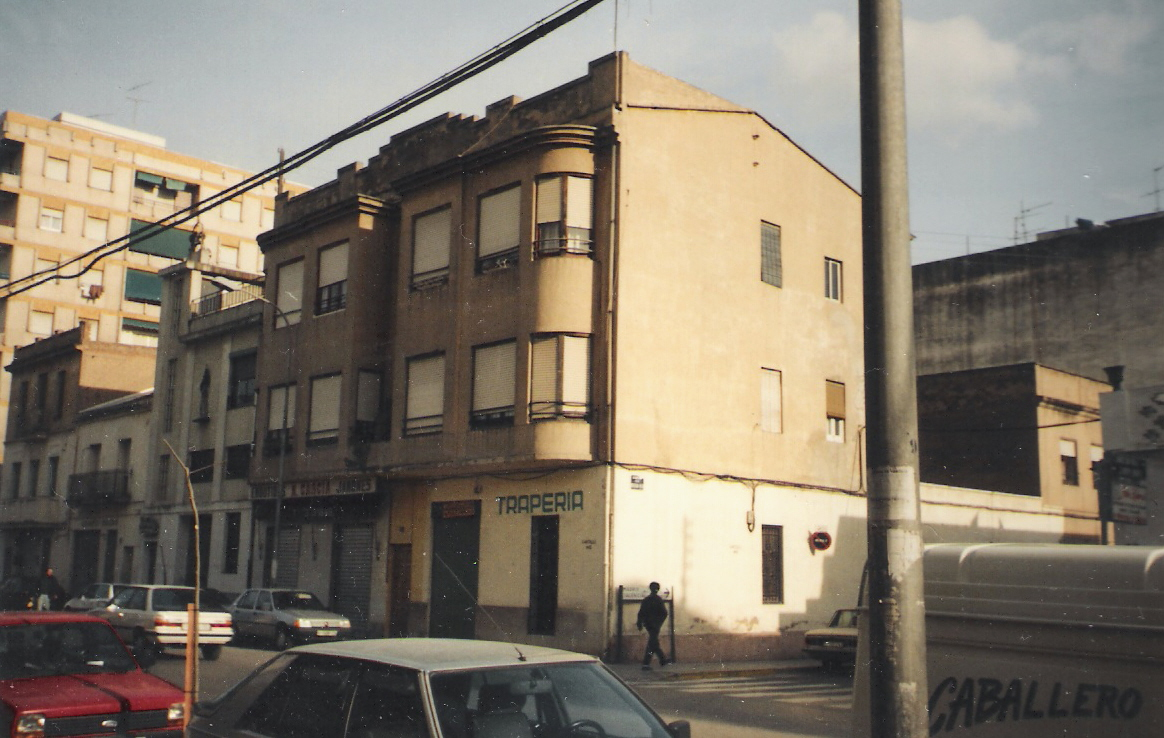
calle Marcelino Oreja, Mislata

The public memory of Marcelino Oreja Elósegui has been kept alive mostly thanks to his son, Marcelino Oreja Aguirre, who remained a well-known figure in Spain until the late 20th century. Today the Basques usually appreciate Oreja's work on the Basque autonomy, though they tend to ignore his Carlist political identity; the Leftist-minded Basques view the Basque and the socialist cases as tantamount and consider Oreja the enemy of both. In the Carlist historical discourse he does not figure prominently. In the partisan debates of current-day Spanish politics he is sometimes acknowledged in relation to Jaime Mayor Oreja, depending on political preferences mentioned either with hostility.

== See also ==
- Basque nationalism
- Second Spanish Republic
- Ricardo Oreja Elósegui
