= Minoría Vasco-Navarra =

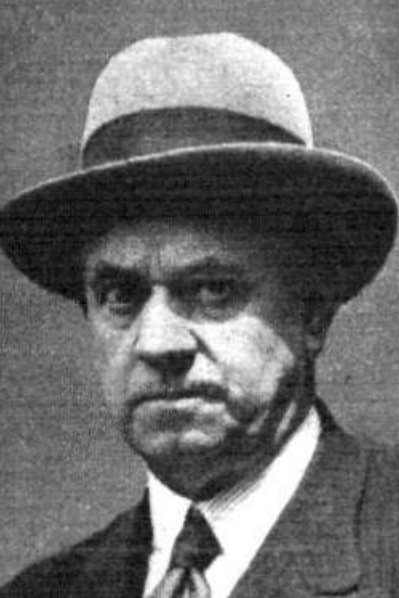
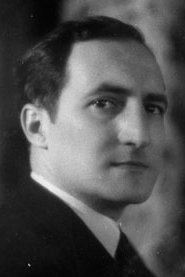
Beunza, Aguirre, CT and PNV standards

Minoría Vasco-Navarra (English: Basque-Navarrese Minority) was a right-wing parliamentary grouping in the Spanish Cortes during the term of 1931–1933. It was composed of 15 deputies and had no tangible impact on politics of the Republic. However, it matters in history of Basque nationalism and Carlism.

== History ==
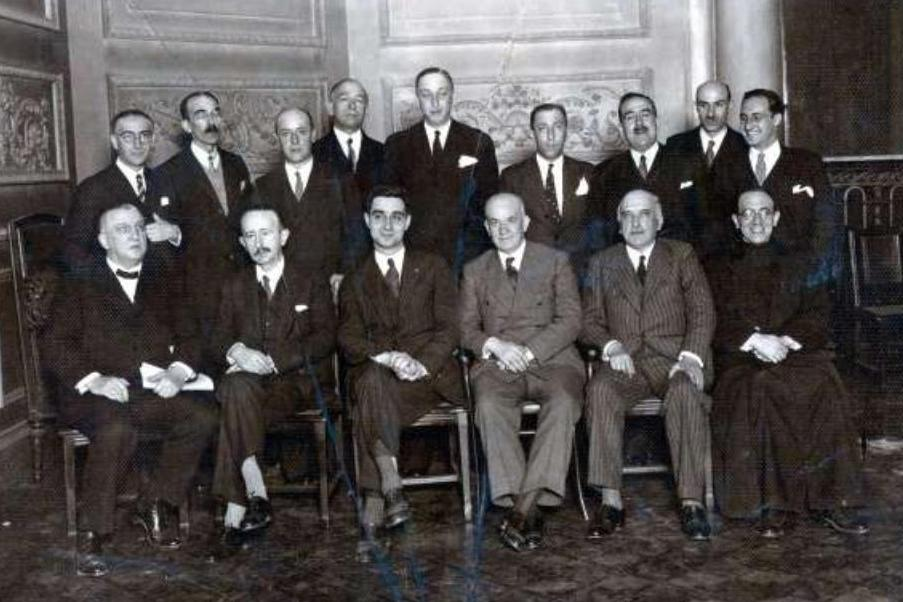
minoría, 1931

The minority originated as an electoral alliance of 2 parties: Basque nationalists from Partido Nacionalista Vasco and Carlists from Comunión Tradicionalista, plus some independent candidates not associated with any organisation. During the electoral campaign of June 1931 the alliance fielded its candidates in 4 out of 50 provinces: Álava, Biscay, Gipuzkoa, and Navarra; in Biscay and Gipuzkoa it appeared under the name of "Pro Estatuto Vasco", while in Álava and Navarre as "Candidatura Católico-fuerista".

The alliance won 15 mandates out of 470; Minoría Vasco-Navarra became one of the smallest parliamentary groups in the chamber. Its chairman was Joaquín Beunza Redín, the deputy chairman was José Antonio Aguirre. Its key objectives were 1) restraining belligerent secularisation of public life, promoted by centre-left; and 2) creating an autonomous region, which would consist of 4 provinces in question.

Between July and August 1931 the Minoría tried to form alliances with many other parties, but were only able to find common ground with the Spanish Agrarian Party, though were still unable to come to an agreement.

In practical terms the Basque-Carlist alliance broke up in June 1932, when during works on autonomy the mayors from Carlist-dominated Navarre rejected the scheme. At this point PNV leaders concluded that alliance with the Traditionalists offered no gains and Minoría Vasco-Navarra became a rather formal arrangement, maintained only for the sake of some technical benefits, enjoyed by parliamentary groupings in the Cortes. There was no attempt to re-create the alliance during the electoral campaign of 1933.

== Composition ==
name	age (Note: in 1931)	political current	district (Note: "Biscay (C)" - Biscay capital (Bilbao and the adjacent urban area, including Barracaldo, Portugalete, Santurce, Guecho, Zamudio, Basauri and other), "Biscay (P)" - Biscay province)	# of votes	% of votes (Note: number of votes gathered in proportion to number of voters taking part in elections)	% of electorate (Note: number of votes gathered in proportion to number of people eligible to vote)	profession	side during the war (Note: later alignement during the Spanish Civil War; "R" - Republicans, "N" - Nationalists)	during Francoism	death
Aguirre Lecube, José Antonio	27	Nationalist	Navarre	46,419	62,9	52,5	lawyer	R	on exile, PM of Basque exile gvnmnt	1960
Aizpún Santafé, Rafael	42	independent	Navarre	46,699	63,3	52,9	lawyer	N	in Cortes, Juanista, sidetracked	1981
Basterrechea Zaldívar, Francesco	43	Nationalist	Biscay (P)	14,601	49,2	39,4	lawyer	R	on exile until 1952, later out of politics	1975
Beunza Redín, Joaquín	59	Traditionalist	Navarre	46,102	62,5	52,2	lawyer	-	-	1936
Domínguez Arévalo, Tomás	49	Traditionalist	Navarre	45,940	62,3	51,0	landowner	N	minister, Juanista	1952
Eguileor Orueta, Manuel	47	Nationalist	Biscay (C)	23,319	37,0	28,5	technician, entrepreneur, publisher	R	on exile until late 1940s, later out of politics	1970
Gortari Errea, Miguel	44	independent	Navarre	46,925	63,6	53,1	entrepreneur, civil servant	N	Pamplona mayor, longtime Cortes deputy	1968
Horn Areilza, José	51	Nationalist	Biscay (C)	23,540	37,4	28,8	lawyer, civil servant, academic	-	-	1936
Leizaola Sánchez, Jesús María	35	Nationalist	Gipuzkoa	35,901	58,3	49,1	lawyer	R	on exile until 1976, PM of Basque exile gvnmnt	1989
Oreja Elósegui, Marcelino	37	Traditionalist	Biscay (P)	15,982	49,2	39,4	entrepreneur	-	-	1934
Oriol Uriguen, José Luis	54	Traditionalist	Álava	8,016	37,6	30,6	entrepreneur	N	in regime-related business oligarchy	1972
Picavea Leguía, Rafael	64	independent	Gipuzkoa	35,937	58,4	49,2	entrepreneur, publisher, official	R	on exile	1946
Pildain Zapiain, Antonio	41	independent	Gipuzkoa	35,942	58,4	49,2	religious	N	longtime bishop of the Canary Islands	1973
Robles Aranguiz, Manuel (Note: elected in by-elections of October 4, 1931)	47	Nationalist	Biscay (P)	19,527	60,1	48,1	journalist, author, trade union activist	R	on exile until 1976	1982
Urquijo Ibarra, Julio	60	Traditionalist	Gipuzkoa	35,819	58,2	49,0	landowner	N	focused on science, stayed clear of politics	1950

== See also ==
- Partido Nacionalista Vasco
- Comunión Tradicionalista
