= Statute of Autonomy of the Basque Country of 1936 =

Republican Spanish legal document

The Statute of Autonomy of the Basque Country of 1936 (Spanish: Estatuto de Autonomía del País Vasco de 1936; Basque: 1936ko Euzkadiren Berjabetasun-Araudia) was the first statute of autonomy of the Basque Country. It was approved by the Cortes Generales of the Second Spanish Republic on 1 October 1936 in Valencia, in the midst of the Spanish Civil War. After the approval of the Statute, the first autonomous government was formed, led by José Antonio Aguirre (EAJ-PNV) and with the participation of the PSOE, PCE, EAE-ANV, Republican Left and Republican Union.

== Timeline ==
date	event
1931, April 22	Ministry of Interior dissolves 4 Diputaciones (Álava, Gipuzkoa, Navarra, Vizcaya) and replaces them with appointed Comisiones Gestoras
Estatuto SEV
1931, May 12	Sociedad de Estudios Vascos (SEV) accepts the task to produce a draft of autonomy statute for the entire Vasco-Navarrese area
1931, May 31	SEV publishes its proposal of Vasco-Navarrese autonomy, titled Estatuto General del Estado Vasco and called Estatuto SEV or EGEV
1931, June 7	PNV assembly comes out with suggested amendments to Estatuto SEV
1931, June 11	Assembly of councils from Gipuzkoa comes out with suggested amendments to Estatuto SEV
Estatuto de Estella
1931, June 14	Estatuto SEV is discussed at assembly of council representatives from four provinces in Estella; its amended version is overwhelmingly approved and becomes known as Estatuto de Estella
1931, June 15	Navarrese Comisión Gestora proposes 3 alternative drafts: of Vasco-Navarrese autonomy, Navarrese autonomy, and internal Navarrese regulations
1931, June 28	General elections to the Cortes produce a joint Carlist-PNV representation, known as minoría vasco-navarra
1931, August 10	Gathering of Navarrese council representatives, who overwhelmingly (200 out of 220) endorse Estatuto de Estella
1931, September 25	The Cortes constitutional commission rejects Estatuto de Estella as incompatible with works on a planned constitution
Estatuto de las Gestoras (four provinces)
1931, December 15	Comisiones Gestoras from four provinces gather in Bilbao and decide to work a new autonomy draft
1932, January 31	Representatives of provincial councils gather in four respective capitals and all vote in favor of works towards a joint Vasco-Navarrese autonomy
1932, March 21	Common commission formed by representatives of four Comisiones Gestoras finalise their own draft, known as Estatuto de las Gestoras
1932, April 24	Four Comisiones Gestoras during joint session in San Sebastián agree on Estatuto de las Gestoras and specify further steps
1932, May 22	General assembly of council representatives, planned for this day to vote on Estatuto de las Gestoras, is postponed due to ongoing heated debate
1932, June 19	Representatives of councils from all four provinces gather in Pamplona and by majority (354 out of 550) approve of Estatuto de las Gestoras; however, more Navarrese councils vote against than in favor
Estatuto de las Gestoras (three provinces)
1932, June 26	Comisiones Gestoras from Álava, Gipuzkoa and Vizcaya meet and decide to re-launch works on a new statute, intended for these three provinces only
1932, October 18	Three Comisiones Gestoras invite all parties to form an inter-party committee to work on a new draft; the call is rejected by some groupings
1933, April 23	Local elections in many municipalities produce large Right-wing gains in Álava, Gipuzkoa, Navarre and Vizcaya
1933, August 6	Estatuto de las Gestoras, re-tailored to fit only three provinces, is approved by council representatives gathered in Vitoria and is marked for a referendum
1933, November 5	Amended Estatuto de las Gestoras is subject to referendum in Álava, Gipuzkoa and Vizcaya and wins overwhelming support (84% of entitled voters); however, there is no required 2/3 support in Álava (46%)
stalemate
1933, November 19	General elections to the Cortes produce a Right-dominated assembly
1933, December 22	PNV files a motion to proceed with works on Estatuto de las Gestoras on assumption that rejection in Álava only does not affect the general outcome; the same date majority of Alavese councils ask the Cortes to exclude Álava from further works
1934, January 12	Comisión de Estatutos of the new Cortes declares that the Alavese vote must not be ignored
1934, February 28	the motion to proceed with Estatuto de las Gestoras for Vizcaya and Gipuzkoa only is defeated 125 vs 136 in the Cortes
1934, April 11	The Cortes commission adopts the recommendation that the referendum be repeated in Álava
1934, April 28	Two-day plenary debate in the Cortes produces no decision as to further proceedings on Basque autonomy
1934, June 12	In protest against protracted works on autonomy, PNV deputies withdraw from the Cortes
1935, November 14	Alavese councils adopt Carta Foral de Álava, a document with proposal of provincial autonomous regime; it would never be discussed by the Cortes
Estatuto de Prieto, Estatuto de Elgeta
1936, February 16	General elections to the Cortes produce a Frente Popular dominated assembly
1936, April 17	The new Cortes constitutes its Comision de Estatutos with Indalecio Prieto as its president
1936, May 12	The new Cortes declares that the aggregate result of 1933 referendum is valid and binding also for Álava
1936, June 15	The Cortes commission introduces changes to Estatuto de las Gestoras, advanced mostly by Prieto; this version becomes known as Estatuto de Prieto and is intended for three provinces
1936, July 6	The government discusses Estatuto de Prieto, but fails to agree on the way forward
1936, July 18	Military coup on the peninsula; the Civil War begins
1936, September 29	The Cortes commission accepts Estatuto de Prieto as its official proposal
1936, October 1	Estatuto de Prieto is adopted by the Cortes as the official autonomy statute. As at the time the frontline in Vascongadas was in the town of Elgeta, the document also became known as Estatuto de Elgeta
1936, October 6	Cortes-adopted autonomy statute is officially published; in practice it enters into force only in Vizcaya, as Álava and Gipuzkoa are already held by the Nationalists
