= Spanish names of the Basque Country =

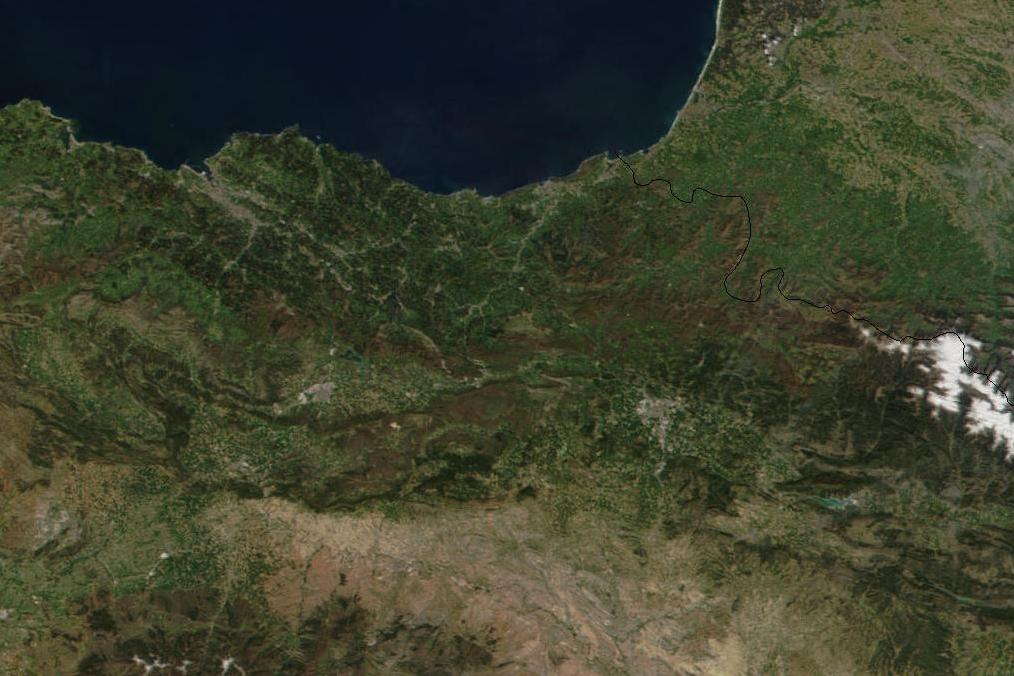
NASA photo, 21st century

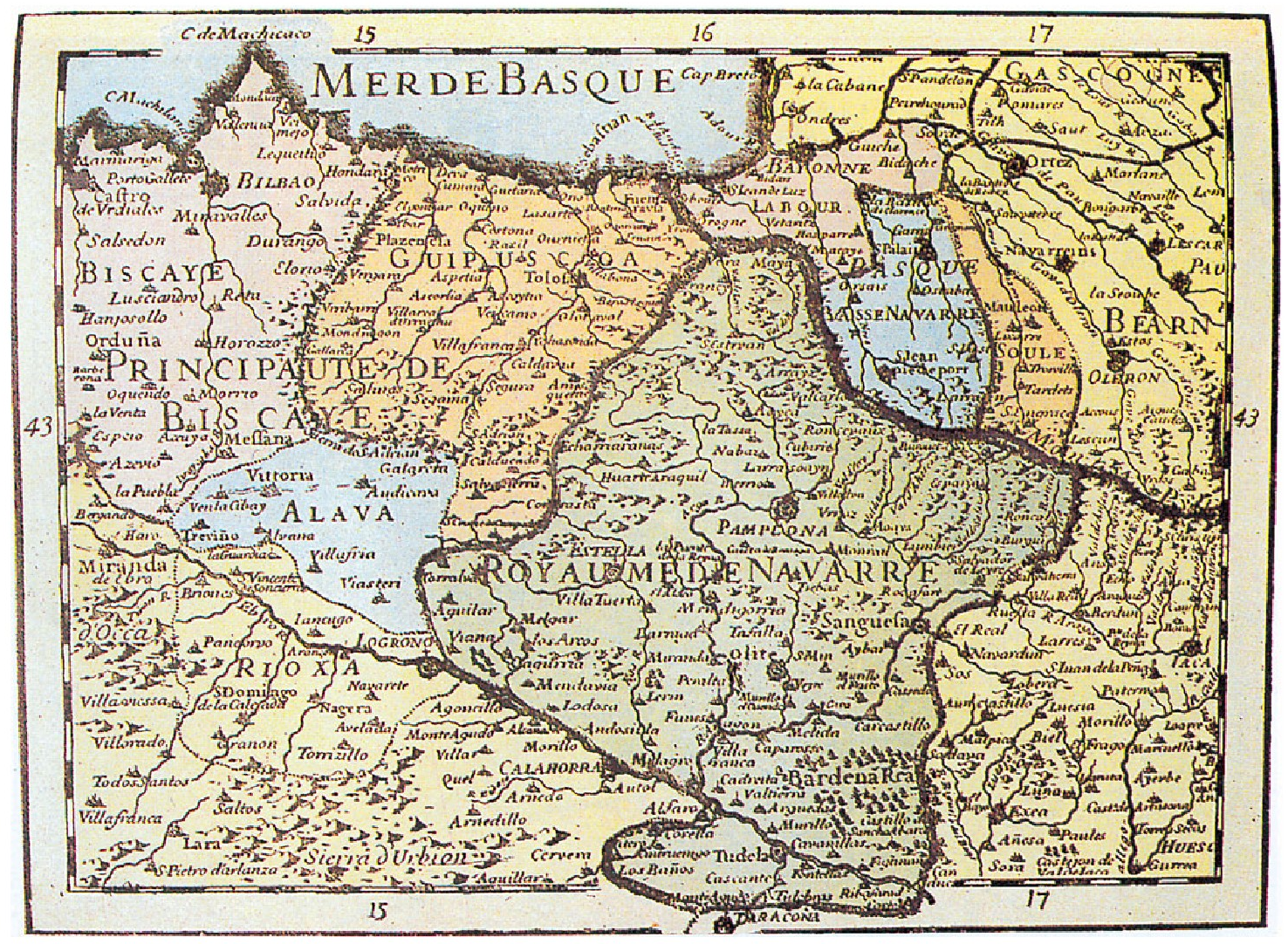
French map, 18th century

In the Spanish public discourse the territory traditionally inhabited by the Basques was assigned a variety of names across the centuries. Terms used might have been almost identical, with hardly noticeable difference in content and connotation, or they could have varied enormously, also when consciously used one against another. The names used demonstrate changing perceptions of the area and until today the nomenclature employed could be battleground between partisans of different options.

== List of names used ==
The below list contains names applied in Spanish cultural realm to the territory traditionally inhabited by the Basques. Terms originating from other languages (first of all Basque, though also Latin) are acknowledged if in circulation also in Spanish. The list contains indisputably proper names (e.g. "Provincias Vascongadas"), names with unclear or varying usage (e.g. "Provincias Exentas" or "provincias exentas") and names which have never acquired the status of a proper name, though they might have been intended to (e.g. "provincias hermanas"). Names differing only in terms of orthography are grouped under one heading. Non-Spanish names which barely made it to the Spanish cultural discourse (e.g. "Hirurak bat", "Zazpiak Bat", "Gascuña") are not listed.

=== Cantabria ===
A term sometimes used in official and semi-official prints until the mid-19th century, usually referring to the Basque lands without Navarre and specifically Álava, Biscay and Gipuzkoa or to Álava, Biscay, Gipuzkoa and Navarre. It started to get out of circulation when applied to Basque territories in the early 19th century, with increasing usage focused on Santander and the adjacent area; the Santander province created in 1833 was originally to be named Cantabria. In public usage the term was already firmly related to Santander when the Basque nationalist movement emerged in the late 19th century. Today "Cantabria" is official name of the autonomous community centered upon Santander; also in unofficial circulation the term is used likewise, with application to Álava, Biscay, Gipuzkoa and/or Navarre only in historical discourse.

=== Euskalerría ===
Also Euskal-Erria, Euskal Erria, Euskal-Herria, Euskal Herria, Euskeria, always capitalized. In Basque literally Basque realm. The term traditionally in use in different Basque spoken dialects, it was first used in writing (in alavese Basque dialect) in the 16th century and enjoyed renaissance with growing number of Basque prints since the 1880s, filtering into Spanish and used usually as macaronic intercalation. Originally it could have referred to a territory, a population, a cultural commonality or all these components together. Most commonly it simply denoted a Basque realm, understood as a conglomerate of historical, regional, ethnic, cultural and religious ingredients. Originally it was entirely deprived of political flavor; in the late 19th century it was briefly adopted by emerging Basque nationalists (to denote a Basque land), who later abandoned it for the sake of “Euzkadi”. In the early 20th century “Euskalerria” adopted a conservative political taste (with some tension between “Euskalerria” and “Euzkadi”), entirely lost during Francoism. In the later 20th century the term was re-adopted by the nationalists; since 1979 “Euskal Herria” is one of two official Basque names of the autonomous community consisting of Biscay, Gipuzkoa and Álava. Geographical application was and is (except official use) ambiguous depending on perceived territorial coverage of the Basque realm; it could include Labourd, Lower Navarre and Soule or even territories in Argentina and Uruguay.

=== Euzkadi ===
Also Euskadi, always capitalized. In current Basque Basque land, originally meaning Basque-race land. The term was created as “Euzkadi” by Sabino Arana in the late 19th century, who felt that “Euskalerria”, “Vascongadas”, “Vasconia” or other terms did not properly reflect the idea of separate Basque race identity and the ensuing distinctive character of the territory the Basques inhabited. In the early 20th century the term filtered into Spanish, though used sparsely, usually as macaronic intercalation, and never lexicalized; its precedent terms, briefly considered in Basque, "Euzkadia" and "Euskaria" have never entered wider circulation. From the outset the term was (intentionally) politically charged, as it served nationalist Basque purposes; it was opposed or ignored by those who preferred to confront Basque political ambitions. “Euzkadi” was the official Basque name of the autonomous territory created in 1936; "Euskadi" (note different spelling) is currently one of two official Basque names of the autonomous community consisting of Álava, Biscay and Gipuzkoa. Originally the term was applied to all territories perceived as forming part of the Basque realm and is still used this way by some nationalist groupings. Naturalized in present-day Spanish as an official equivalent of "País Vasco", the Basque Autonomous Community.

=== país eúskaro ===
Also Pais Eúskaro. In Spanish literally Euskera-speaking country. The term was in circulation in the late 19th and the early 20th century, though used very sporadically and almost exclusively against a cultural and literary background. The term strongly focused not only on Basque language, but also on the entire cultural and ethnic realm built around it. It was used principally by partisans of the Basque identity, usually understood in cultural and linguistic terms (though also in national terms). Geographical application was ambiguous; prevailing usage ignored existing administrative divisions and pointed to area inhabited by people belonging to the Basque cultural realm. In many respects the term was identical to “Euskalerria”, though “país eúskaro” (except having been a neologism) emphasized language and cultural dimension, while “Euskalerria” maintained balance between linguistic-ethnic threads and historical-religious threads. Today entirely out of use.

=== país vasco ===
Also País Vasco, país basco. In Spanish literally Basque country. The term was in circulation in writing as early as in the 15th century, though until the 20th century used rather sporadically. Similar in meaning and geographical application to “provincias vascas”, i.e. could have been applied to 3, 4 or 7 units in Spain and France; the difference was that it underlined unity of the area and did not put its internal administrative heterogeneity on the forefront. The difference between “país vasco” and “país vascongado” was that the former put slightly more emphasis on the Basque character, while the latter tended to be more lexicalized. In the 1920s the term overtook “Provincias Vascongadas” in terms of popular press usage. In 1936 adopted (with both words capitalized as “País Vasco”) as official Spanish name of the autonomous Basque area within the Second Spanish Republic, today it remains official name of the autonomous community consisting of Álava, Biscay and Gipuzkoa provinces. In present-day nationalist discourse it could be applied (capitalized or not) to any area deemed part of the proper Basque country.

=== país vasco-navarro ===
Also país vasconavarro, País Vasconavarro, país basko-navarro. In Spanish literally Basque-Navarrese country. Never appearing as “país navarro-vasco”. The term was in public circulation since the early 19th century but unlike other descriptions using the “vasco-navarro” adjective (“pueblo vasco-navarro”, “ejercito vasco-navarro” etc. ) it was used rather sporadically. Applied to Biscay, Gipuzkoa, Álava and Navarre when intending to underline any sort of commonality (historical, economic, geographical etc., though rather not ethnic) linking the four. Upon growth of the Basque nationalism it got used against the background of differences between Navarre on the one hand and Álava, Biscay and Gipuzkoa on the other, though with various intentions (to stress or to downplay them). Its confusing political usage led to de-emphasizing of political contents. Today generally out of use, except for historical or specific cultural discourse.

=== país vascongado ===
In Spanish literally Basque-speaking country. The term entered circulation in the second half of the 19th century; it was used rather sporadically until the Civil War. Almost abandoned during Francoism, following Spanish transition to democracy it is hardly in use. Similar in geographical application to “provincias vascongadas”, i.e. applied to Álava, Biscay and Gipuzkoa. There were two key differences between “país vascongado” and “provincias vascongadas”: 1) the former was not the official name of the region (though at times used in the interchanging mode), and 2) the former underlined unity of the area and did not put its internal administrative heterogeneity on the forefront. The difference between “país vascongado” and “país vasco” (in its 19th-century usage) was tiny; the former was more lexicalized, the latter put more emphasis on Basque (historical, cultural, ethnic) character.

=== provincias eúskaras ===
Also provincias Eúskaras, Provincias eúskaras. In Spanish literally Euskara-speaking provinces. The term entered circulation in the mid-19th century; used sporadically, it disappeared in the very early 20th century. It emphasized Basque character somewhat stronger than “provincias vascas” and far stronger than “provincias vascongadas”, though still fell short of acknowledging Basque ethnicity as key feature of the area in question; at times it even pointed to patchy nature of the territory discussed. Contained no political contents or undertones. The nascent Basque nationalism did not use the name. Geographically applied to Álava, Biscay and Gipuzkoa. Today entirely out of use.

=== provincias exentas ===
Also Provincias exentas, Provincias Exentas. In Spanish literally exempted provinces. The term entered circulation in the mid-18th century and was gradually getting out of use in the second half of the 19th century; in the early 20th century it was already entirely defunct. The name underlined that among all Spanish provinces, the ones in question were exempted from standard fiscal and conscription obligations. The term was seldom used to denote homogeneous character of the provinces; it did not underline their commonality, but rather the character making each of them distinct from the remaining Spanish provinces. It contained no ethnic ingredient whatsoever, the regional one was present though rather muted. Geographical usage of the term differed; generally it was applied to Álava, Biscay and Gipuzkoa, though sporadically (especially in the early 19th century) it could have denoted also Navarre. Currently not only out of use but also almost entirely forgotten term.

=== provincias forales ===
In Spanish literally foral provinces. The term is in circulation since the 19th century, though used rather sparsely. The name underlines that provinces in question enjoy some traditional, separate, province-specific (not region-specific) legal establishments, known as fueros. In most cases usage and context imply detailed administrative coverage, which is by no means obvious; understanding might differ depending which provincial legal specifics is considered "fueros". In such cases in public discourse usually the term is applied to Álava, Biscay and Gipuzkoa, at times also explicitly. Somewhat less frequently the term is applied also to Navarre, though this usage prevails in historiographic scholarly discourse. In specific cases - also usually in historiography - "provincias forales" could mean also provinces in Aragon, Catalonia and elsewhere.

=== provincias hermanas ===
In Spanish literally sister provinces. The term enjoyed some popularity at the turn of the 19th and 20th century, though still it was used rather sporadically and in specialized rather than popular discourse. It was unique among all terms discussed here, as it was the only one capturing both diversity (referring to different provinces) and commonality (acknowledging their sister character). It strongly underlined unity of the provinces referred to, usually against a cultural, historical, ethnic or national background. Very much like “provincias vascongadas” and even “provincias eúskaras”, the term was not necessarily employed by partisans of the commonality discussed (in ethnic or national sense), and could have been employed in quite informal mode. Geographically the term was applied usually towards Álava, Biscay and Gipuzkoa. "Provincias hermanas" could have been also applied to any chosen Spanish provinces deemed similar or even generally, to all Spanish provinces. Today out of use and entirely forgotten.

=== provincias vascas ===
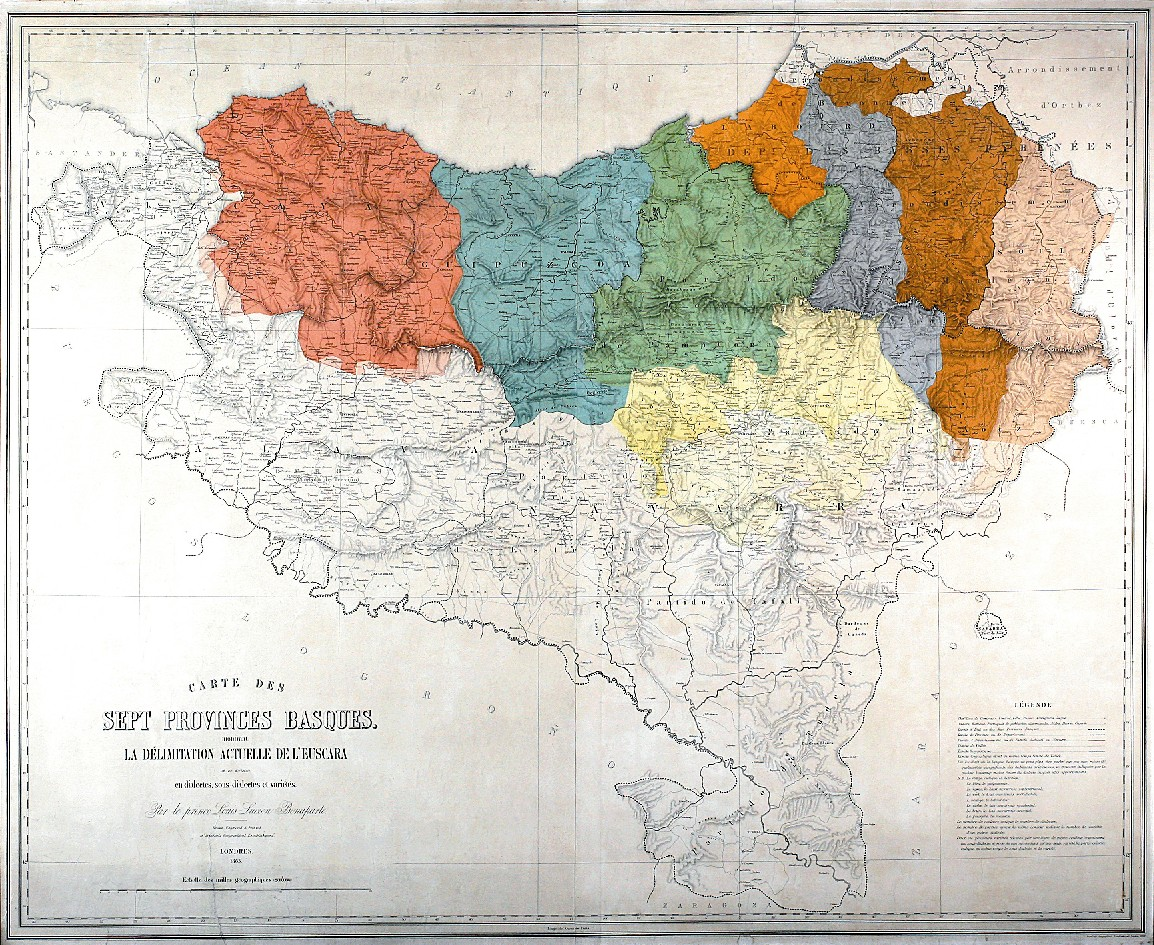
Map Sept Provinces Basques by Louis Lucien Bonaparte, edited in London, 1863

In Spanish literally Basque provinces. The term entered circulation in the 19th century, though in terms of press usage until the Civil War it trailed far behind “provincias vascongadas” or “país vasco”. The term put slightly more emphasis on Basque character of the area than “provincias vascongadas” did. Its usage by no means implied support for Basque cause either politically or otherwise (though it might have). Geographical application of the term was ambiguous. Most commonly it referred to Álava, Biscay and Gipuzkoa, though it might have referred also to Navarre and (rarely) even to 3 French provinces; in such cases it usually focused on ethnic question. Today it is used sometimes (rather occasionally) to denote Álava, Biscay and Gipuzkoa. It was not capitalized (usage of “Provincias Vascas” is rather exceptional).

=== provincias vascongadas ===
Also Provincias Vascongadas, provincias Vascongadas, provincias bascongadas, provincias Bascongadas, Provincias Bascongadas, provincias baskongadas. In Spanish literally Basque-speaking provinces. The term entered circulation in the 17th century and remained in use until the first half of the 20th century, though since the late 19th century with decreasing unofficial usage. Until the 1930s it was the official administrative name of the region (in this usage capitalized). Until the early 20th century it was also the most common, rather neutral way of naming the area in question; in the 1920s it started to give precedence to “País Vasco”. Though the name technically pointed to distinct linguistic character of the area, the component was later subject to lexicalization and ceased to stand out. Usage of the term did not imply the intention to underline a separate, Basque ethnic character of the provinces. The term was generally applied to Álava, Biscay and Gipuzkoa, exceptionally also to Navarre. Today almost entirely out of circulation, used very sporadically and generally against a historical background.

=== Vascongadas ===
also Bascongadas, bascongadas, Baskongadas, in Spanish literally Basque-speaking [provinces, territory, area, country]. Developed as an abbreviated form of “Provincias Vascongadas”, and not seldom used in official documents until the 1930s. In unofficial circulation “Vascongadas” along “Provincias Vascongadas” was the most common denomination until the late Restoration period, but gave way to “País Vasco” in the 1920s-1930s. Though technically it pointed to Basque character of the area in question, the feature was entirely lexicalized and did not stand out. Fairly neutral in usage, deprived of ethnic, let alone national notions. A rather slight difference between “Vascongadas” and “Provincias Vascongadas” was that the former name did not acknowledge provinces, either in terms of their heterogeneity or in terms of their forming part of Spanish administrative structure; however, this technical lexical difference has usually not been exploited for political reasons. Geographically the term was applied to Álava, Biscay and Gipuzkoa, though sporadically it could have included also Navarre. The term was almost eradicated – at least in territorial application – during Francoism. Except sporadic cases and rather accidental usage in official documents it was not revived afterwards, as most common denomination replaced by “País Vasco”. Currently out of circulation, except in historical discourse or in personal columns, sometimes consciously used to note nominal controversies.

=== Vasconia ===
also vasconia, baskonia, Baskonia, Wasconia, also plural Vasconiae, Vasconias, and part of the etymology of Gascony. In Latin Basque Land. The term emerged in Roman times and until medieval era it was occasionally used in Latin documents and maps, usually with ambiguous geographical rather than political denotation. Rarely used in Spanish; when used in plural it referred to 2 parts (“ambas Vasconias”, “dos Vasconias”): the Spanish and the French one. It enjoyed modest revival in the late 19th century, used generally against a cultural, historical and regional background; it appeared mostly in literary or scientific Vascólogist discourse. The term underlined commonality of Basque area but was deprived of political notions; it tended to put common history on the forefront. It lacked clear geographical meaning and was applied according to perceived territorial coverage of the Basque realm. Following demise in the early 20th century, “Vasconia” enjoyed some revival during Francoism; unlike politically-charged “país vasco” or “provincias vascas”, censorship tolerated it easily as a historical, semi-scientific reference. Following brief confusion among the nationalists in the mid-1960s, currently it is out of use except for historical discourse (or names of institutions, sporting associations etc.).

== See also ==
- País Vasco
- Euskal Herria
- Basque Country (autonomous community)
- Basque Country (greater region)
