= Basque Studies Society =

Scientific-cultural institution created in 1918

- Formation: 1918
- Location: Spain

The Basque Studies Society (Basque: Eusko Ikaskuntza; 'EI-SEV' ) is a scientific-cultural institution created in 1918 by the Provincial Councils of Álava, Vizcaya, Guipúzcoa and Navarra a stable and lasting resource to develop the Basque culture ". The members of this entity are gathered in different Scientific Sections. It is the only institution of different scientific disciplines that has official implantation in the Basque Country, Navarra and the French Basque Country, awarding, among others, the Manuel Lekuona Award. Personalities from the cultural and scientific world such as Jose Migel Barandiaran were part of its executive cadres, being a member of the Permanent Board of the Society for Basque Studies from 1921 to 1936. The headquarters are at Miramar Palace in San Sebastián, with offices and delegations in Bayona, Pamplona, Vitoria and Bilbao. This congress was chaired by Alfonso XIII of Spain and the whole body of the Navarra Provincial Council attended.
