= Concepción Castella García-Duarte =

Spanish writer

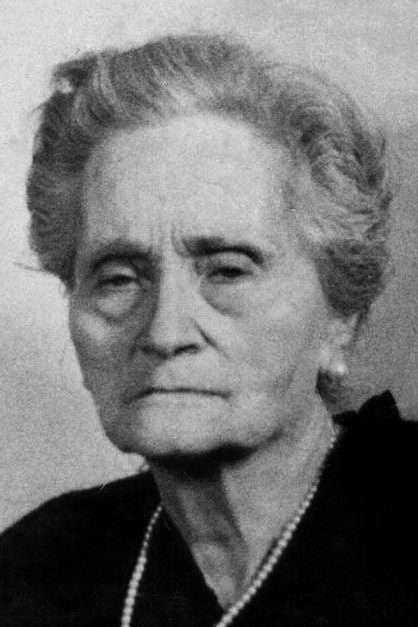
- Born: 1889; Baena, Spain
- Died: 1966 (aged 76–77); Madrid
- Known for: writer
- Political party: Carlism

María Concepción Castella y García-Duarte (1889–1966) was a Spanish writer, in literature known by the name of Concepción Castella de Zavala. She was the author of some 25 novels, published between 1936 and 1950. Intended for a popular audience, they combined action and romance; they also promoted traditional values like patriotism, family and religion. As she embraced the Carlist outlook, her prose is also saturated with Traditionalism. Today her literary production is considered of minor importance and low quality; it is usually categorized as second-rate prose of early Francoism. She is mostly ignored by historians of literature, though she might be acknowledged when discussing novels related to feminist threads or local Granada customs.

== Family and youth ==
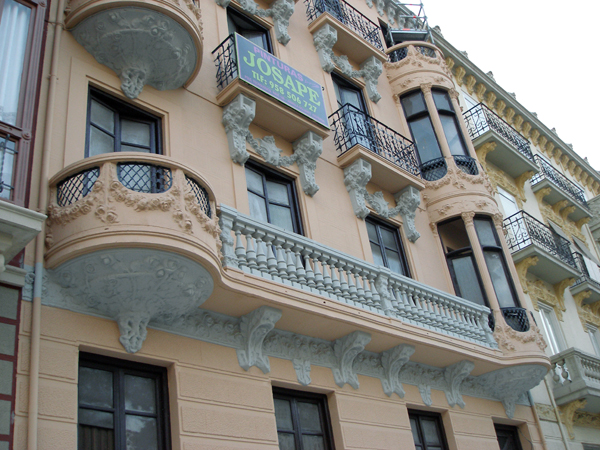
Castella house, Granada

The Castella surname appears mostly along the Spanish Mediterranean coast, especially in Catalonia and the Baleares, yet it is not clear what branch Concepción descended from. Some sources claim that her paternal grandfather, unknown by name, was related to banking, probably in Granada. He was married to Trinidad González-Aurioles Castaldo (born 1833); she was daughter to Miguel González-Aurioles, a pipe organ builder known for works in Granada churches of the early 19th century. Nothing further is known about the couple, except that they formed part of the well-off burgesía granadina. Their son and the father of Concepción, Ricardo Castella y González-Aurioles (died 1925), was educated as a lawyer; in the 1890s and 1900s he practiced as attorney and judge in the Salvador district. Some sources refer to him also as a banquero; at various points in time he managed municipality-run institutions like Hospital de San Lázaro and was teaching law at Real Colegio de San Bartolomé y Santiago in Granada. At the turn of the centuries he was councilor in the Granada ayuntamiento and served as teniente de alcalde, the deputy mayor; in the early 1910s he was president of Junta Municipal del Censo.

At unspecified time, though probably in the mid-1880s, Ricardo Castella married Blanca García-Duarte González. She came from a prestigious Granada family; her father and the maternal grandfather of Concepción, Eduardo García Duarte, though born in Madrid, became an iconic Granada personality. Educated in medicine, he earned his status due to contribution to fighting cholera outbursts, management of the municipal sanitary infrastructure, as academic and as rector of the University of Granada from 1872 to 1875; he reportedly rejected the marqués title, offered to him by the king. Ricardo and Blanca lived in Granada, in the late 1900s they moved to the large, four-storey residence in the centre of the city, designed for the family by a prestigious architect. Today considered a cultural heritage of the city, it hosted 24 flats which covered 9,125 square meters.

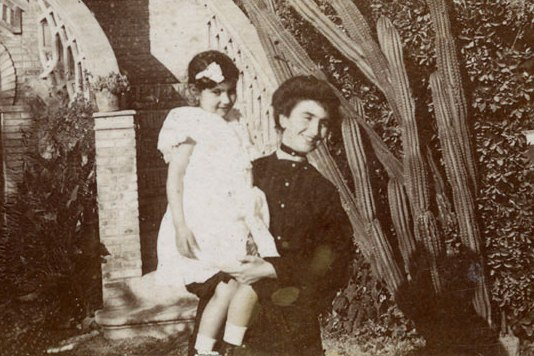
with maternal aunt, 1890s

The couple had five children. None of the sources consulted clarifies why Concepción was born in Baena, though it is understood she spent her childhood and youth in Granada. Nothing is known of her education. In 1915 she married Miguel Zavala Lara (1883–1973), at the time a junior officer in the rank of farmaceútico primero, in the medical branch of the army. The couple shuttled across Spain and Morocco following military postings of Zavala; in 1916 he was assigned to Larache, and subsequent relocations followed. They had six children, born between the mid-1910s and the mid-1920s. Two of them became public figures: José María Zavala Castella was a Carlist politician who championed the pro-socialist turn of the movement during late Francoism, while Juan Zavala Castella during the same period served as director general de prisiones; both were active in ex-combatant requeté, though José promoted the progressist and Juan the traditionalist perspective. Concepción was cousin to the socialist politician Rafael García-Duarte Salcedo and the writer Francisco Ayala García-Duarte.

== Writings ==
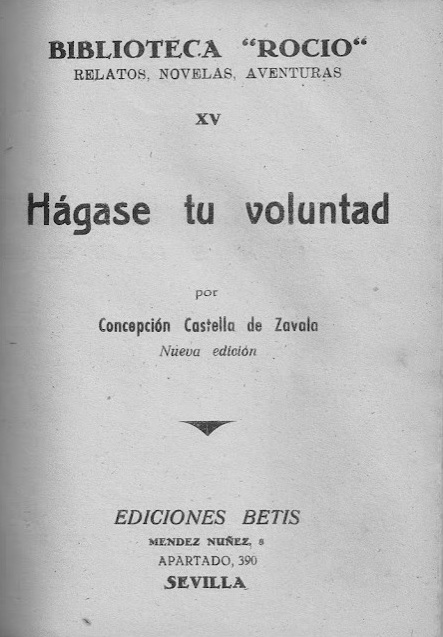
Hágase tu voluntad

Before the war Castella “collaborated with one or another magazine”. Her first works identified were stories serialized in Barcelona-based reviews; La piedra filosofal in a literary magazine Lecturas (1935) and ¿Heroes? in a Catholic weekly La Hormiga de Oro (1936). The latter told a story of a young officer, who sacrificed his love for a woman to take care of own mother and younger siblings, suddenly in financial dire straits. The story revealed some of future trademark features of Castella's prose: romantic threads discussed against the background of moral obligations. In the spring of 1936 as “Concepción Castellá” she published a short novel Campana la de la Vela; evoking a Granadan romantic legend, it explored dilemmas of the local well-off.

Castella's most productive period was the Civil War. She penned three short novels (80–90 pages each) with plot in wartime setting: Guerra en el frente, paz en las almas (1937) was related to the siege of alcázar in Toledo, Hágase tu voluntad (1938) dwelled upon heroism of Santuario de Nuestra Señora de la Cabeza defenders, El Alférez provisional (1939) presented deeds of a young man turned officer. All books featured as protagonists the patriotic Spaniards who joined National troops, though some of them – like in Hágase... – might have gone a long way from aristocratic frivolity to heroism. Another set of her novels revolved aroung Granadan customs and legends, usually with strong amorous ingredient; Juan sin alma, Vivamos sin el amor and Los duendes del Albaicin (all 1938), Cruz de flores and Golondrina (both 1939).

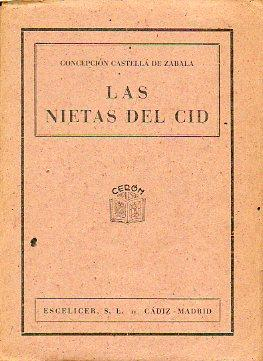
Las nietas del Cid

After the war Castella briefly continued both wartime and Granadan topics; La rosa del Maestrazgo (1940) pictured romance episodes during the Levantine campaign, while La hija de la Alhambra and Ópalos de fuego explored local features (both 1940). Afterwards the author abandoned themes related to both wartime action and Granada customs. Some of her novels tended to be in historical setting (Las nietas del Cid 1940, El castillo de Fierro-Negro 1943,) some featured an exotic background (Nómadas del destino 1945), some explored conventional romance threads (Santina 1941) and there is hardly anything known about others: Las que saben amar (1945), Isabel Reyes (1945), Dogal de oro (1947), Tristeza de amor (1948), Rosas de fuego (1949), La razón de vivir and Tierra en los ojos (both 1950).

Castella's novels were aimed at unsophisticated audience and formed part of popular editorial series; one scholar underlines these within Biblioteca Rocio by a Seville publishing house Ediciones Betis, another claims that most were part of La Novela Rosa by Ediciones Juventud; few were issued by Ediciones Técnicas and enjoyed even some sort of marketing campaign. The ones in wartime setting were among many supposed to sustain support for Nationalist cause. Other novels were more tilted towards entertainment, though they were also supposed to “deliver a sense of normality” in the early Francoist era; a historian puts them in the “conservadurismo casero” rubric, which by means of “literatura inofensiva” exercised “ideological control” over the readers.

== Carlist ==
Carlist standard

None of the sources consulted provides information on political preferences of Castella's ancestors, except that her father was of conservative ideas and as representative of Partido Conservador he competed for seat in the Granada ayuntamiento. It is known, however, that Castella's husband was at least leaning towards Traditionalism, which cost him some problems in terms of his military career. Later works which refer to the children of the couple claim that they were raised in “familia de pura reigambre carlista". The oldest one, Juan, during the family's Tenerife spell of the mid-1930s was already active in right-wing organisations, yet there is no evidence of Carlist or general political engagements of his mother.

Some authors claim that Castella was "partidaria del golpe de Estado de Franco", yet there are no details provided and it is not clear how she could have taken part in the coup. Upon outbreak of the civil war the family resided in Burgos, easily seized by the rebels; two of Concepcion's sons volunteered to requeté. One author claims that along Antonio Pérez de Olaguer and Ignacio Romero Raizábal she was nominated one of "tres cronistas oficiales tradicionalistas", yet there is no information available as to who and in what circumstances made the appointment; neither any Carlist war chronicle written by her is known. However, she saturated her wartime novels with clear Carlist zeal. She was among very few writers active in the Nationalist zone which advanced a Carlist perspective and featured Carlist protagonists. Following enforced political unification of 1937 this might not have been particularly welcome by censorship; with Pérez de Olaguer and Jorge Villarín she formed part of literary “núcleo tradicionalista” and by historians of literature is considered “la más prolífica de este grupo”.

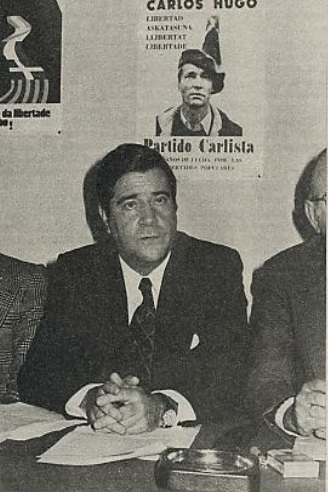
son José María

Castella's last novel with clear Carlist exaltation is La rosa del Maestrazgo, released in 1940. Afterwards she no longer explored the thread, though praise of values which might have been vaguely associated with Traditionalism was present in her later writings. She maintained private contacts with some Carlist political heavyweights, e.g. the movement's Jefe Delegado, Manuel Fal Conde, was godfather at the wedding of her son José María Zavala Castella in 1949 and witness at the wedding of Miguel Zavala Castella in 1955. None of the sources consulted notes what position she took versus increasingly visible rift between two visions of Carlist future: the traditionalist one represented by her son Juan or the progressist one represented by another one, José María. She did not engage in Carlist cultural ventures; it was only posthumously that in 1967 a progressist review Montejurra published her poem Saltando de peña en peña, a vision of Carlist presence in Spanish history across the centuries.

== Reception and legacy ==
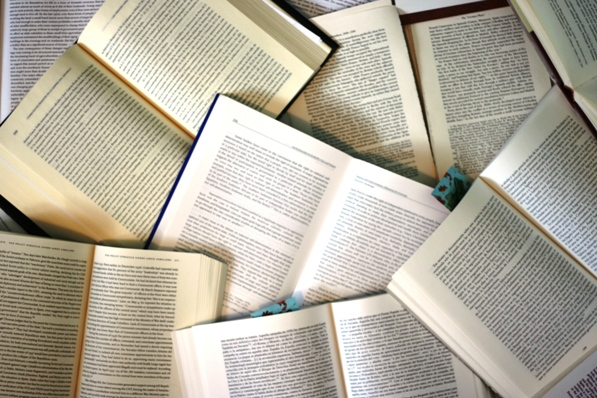

The Francoist press of the late 1930s and the early 1940s used to acknowledge Castella's novels favorably on literary or culture pages, though without particular fanfare; many notes were reproduced literally across various newspapers. According to one historian, she was “among the women writers who have received scant, if any, critical attention”. In brief newspaper notes Castella was referred as “inspired novelist”, “inspired author”, “highly cultured writer”, “illustrious novelist”, “writer endowed with great sensitivity and imagination” etc. Her prose was praised for “vividness of colors”, “deeply felt emotion”, “linguistic elegance”, plot “truly attractive”, “well-founded”, “admirably narrated”, “exquisite femininity”, “pleasant and graceful lecture”, “admirably developed action”, “attractive plot”, “charm of Granada girls”, “extremely cultured language”, “exceptionally rich vocabulary”, “passionate subject”, “original subject”, “narrative of high literary and emotional interest” and “delicate and heartfelt book”. She was presented as the author who “ha conquistado fama y veterania en el cultivo de la novela entretenida y moral”. She has not gained literary laurels; only once, in 1961, the review Familia Española mentioned her among final contenders for “premio de cuentos”. At times she was compared to Sofia Casanova. In scholarly works on history of Spanish literature Castella was treated in footnotes, like in case of the 1963 account by Joaquín Entrambasaguas. Already during her lifetime Castella fell into oblivion; her death was acknowledged merely by few second-rate titles.

Today Castella is ignored in general works on history of Spanish literature. She is absent also in detailed accounts either dealing with 20th-century Spanish literature, or Spanish women writers, or Spanish novel, or Spanish 20th-century novel, or Spanish fascist literature, or post-war Spanish narrative prose. She might be marginally mentioned in treaties on culture during the civil war or on “novela popular”, but still in the secondary rubric of “other authors”. Few works which pay slightly more attention present her as one of many authors who used to write banal, second-rate prose deprived of major if any artistic value; they reportedly combined action and romance and are usually labeled “novela rosa”, sort of “kitchen literature” for intellectually immature audience. This production is relegated to propaganda forming part of the Francoist grip on culture in Spain of the 1940s, “intachables desde el punto de vista de la moralidad de sus escritos” and “guardiana de los valores tradicionales consagrados por la naciente España franquista”, at times referred to a “subliteratura” or “infraliteratura”. If noted without stigmatizing as a reactionary Franquist propagandist, Castella is mentioned as related to literature featuring feminine personalities, old Granada customs, forgotten vocabulary, Andalusian Gypsies, or Carlist narrative. She is marginally mentioned in present-day Carlist cyberspace.

== See also ==
- Carlism
- Carlism in literature
- José María Zavala Castella

== Footnotes ==
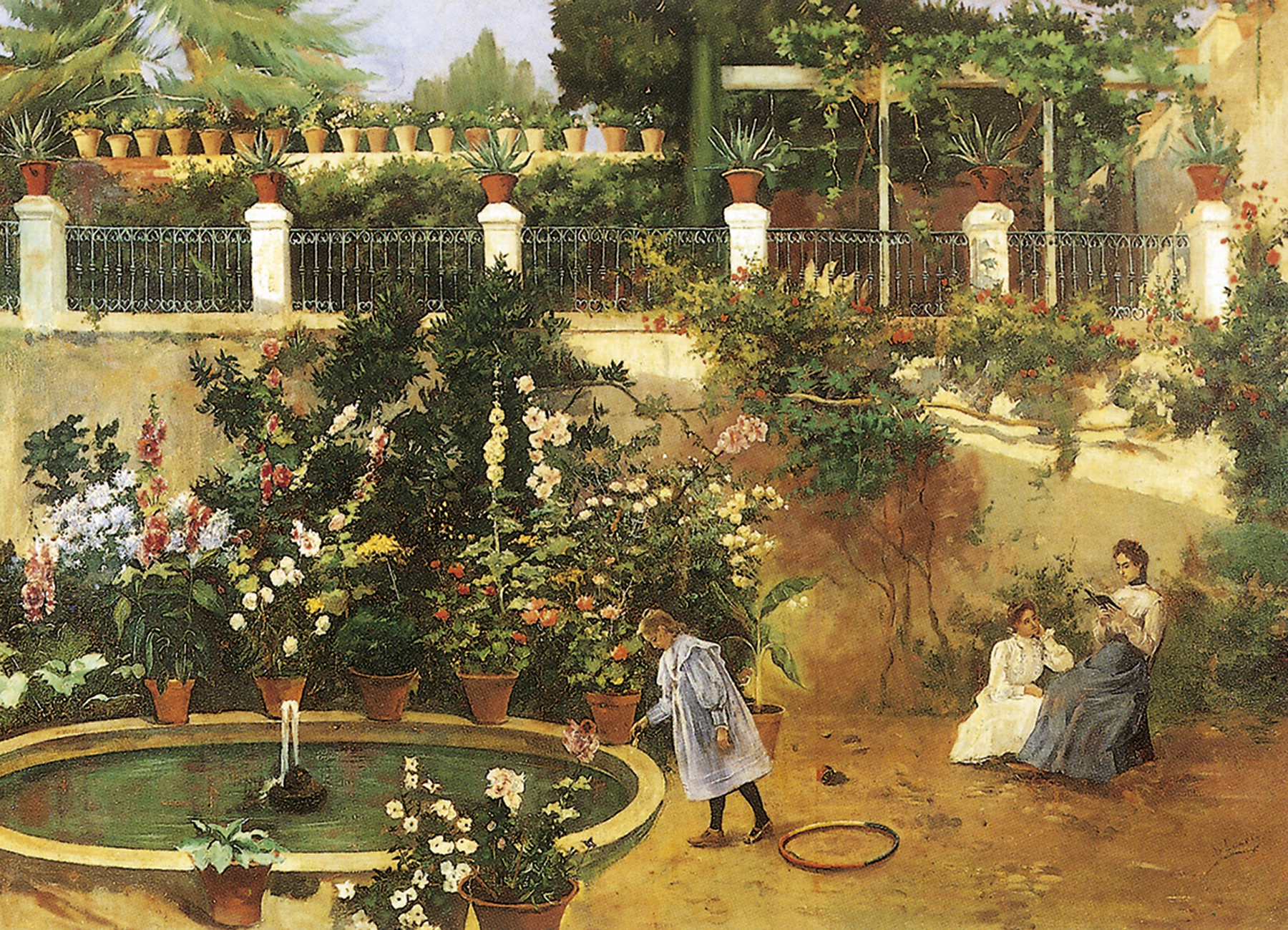
Nuestro jardin (1899) by Luz García-Duarte. The girl in the centre is probably modeled after Concepción
