= Antonio Pérez de Olaguer =

Spanish writer and a Carlist militant

Antonio Pérez de Olaguer Feliu
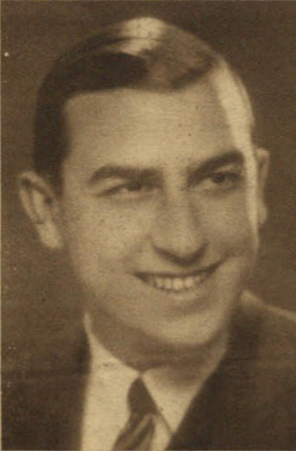
- Born: Antonio Pérez de Olaguer Feliu; 1907; Barcelona, Spain
- Died: 1968 (aged 60–61); Barcelona, Spain
- Occupation: Entrepreneur
- Known for: Writer, editor, publisher
- Political party: Carlism

Antonio María Pérez de Olaguer Feliu (1907–1968) was a Spanish writer and a Carlist militant. As a man of letters he was recognized by his contemporaries for travel literature, novel and drama, gaining much popularity in the 1940s and 1950s. Today he is considered mostly a typical representative of early Francoist culture and his works are denied major value. As a Carlist he remained in the back row, though enjoyed enormous prestige among the Catalan rank and file. For decades he worked to bridge the gap between two groups of Catalan Carlists, the Javieristas and the Sivattistas.

== Family and youth ==
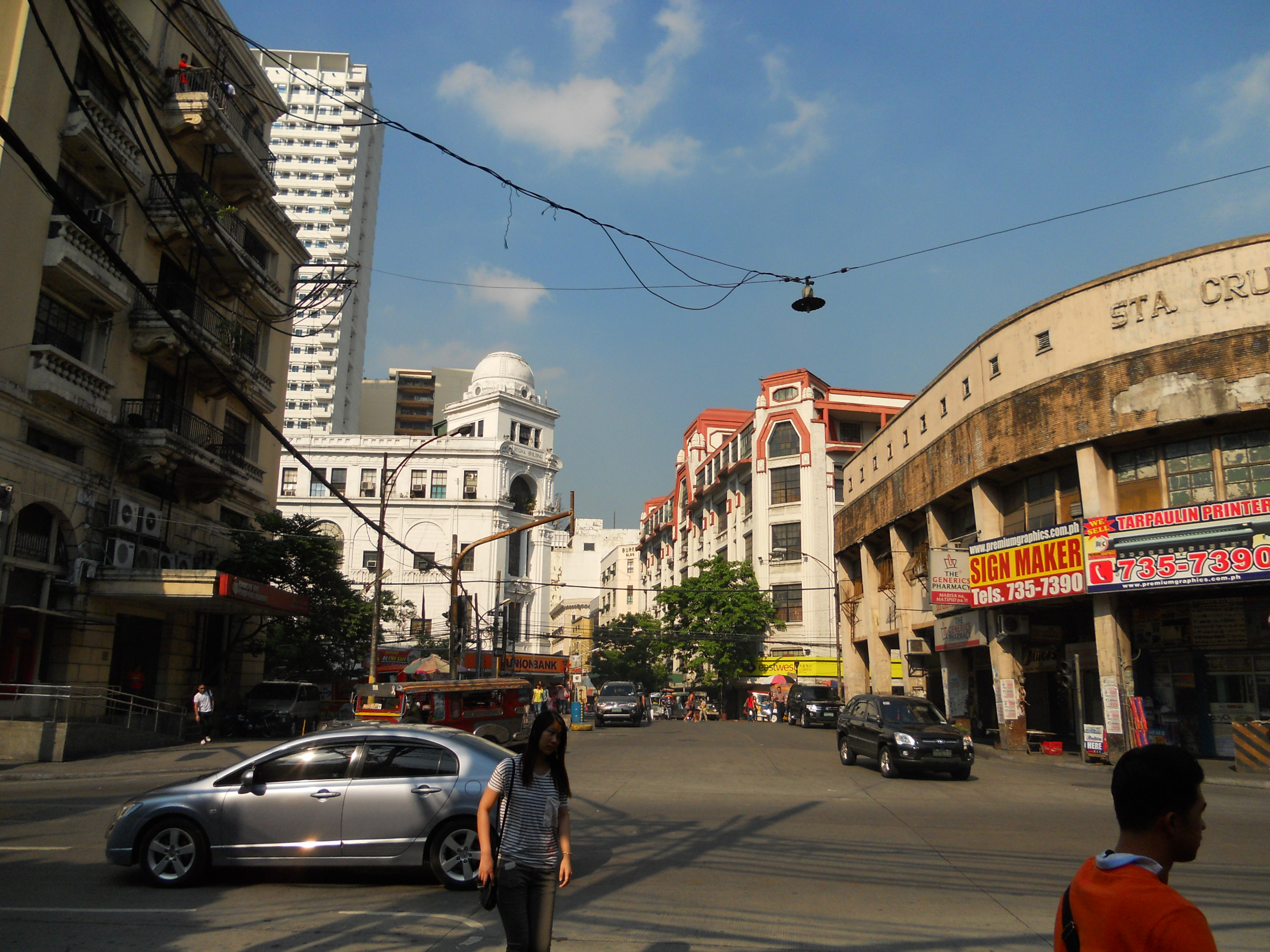
Manila, former Pérez Samanillo department store (back, right)

Antonio Pérez de Olaguer descended from distinguished families both along the paternal and the maternal line. The ancestors of his father originated from Andalusia; his grandfather, Manuel Pérez Marqueti (1829-1889), came from Cádiz. A physician serving in the navy, in the mid-19th century he engaged in trade with the Philippines, then managed state contracts in the islands, and eventually developed own retail and real estate business in Manila. He became one of the Philippine tycoons and left a fortune. The business was inherited by his sons: Antonio's father Luis Pérez Samanillo (1868–1936) and Rafael, who enlarged it further on managing two family-owned companies, R. Pérez Samanillo y Cía and Pérez Samanillo Hermanos. They contributed to urbanization of Manila; the brothers owned much of the Paco district, dried the area and commenced residential development; a street in the city still bears their name. One of few art-decó buildings in Manila used to be their department store.

Antonio's maternal ascendants were related to overseas; his great-great-grandfather Antonio Olaguer Feliu Heredia served as virrey del Rio de la Plata, his son and Antonio's great-grandfather José Olaguer Feliu Azcuenaga opted for Argentine nationality; his son and Antonio's grandfather José María Olaguer Feliu Dubonet (1827-1881) was born and lived in the Philippines. His son and Antonio's maternal uncle general José Olaguer Feliú Ramirez became the minister of war in 1922 and later remained active as a primoderiverista politician. His daughter and Antonio's mother, Francisca de Olaguer Feliú Ramirez (1865–1908), also born and raised in the Philippines, married Luis Pérez; the couple settled in Manila.

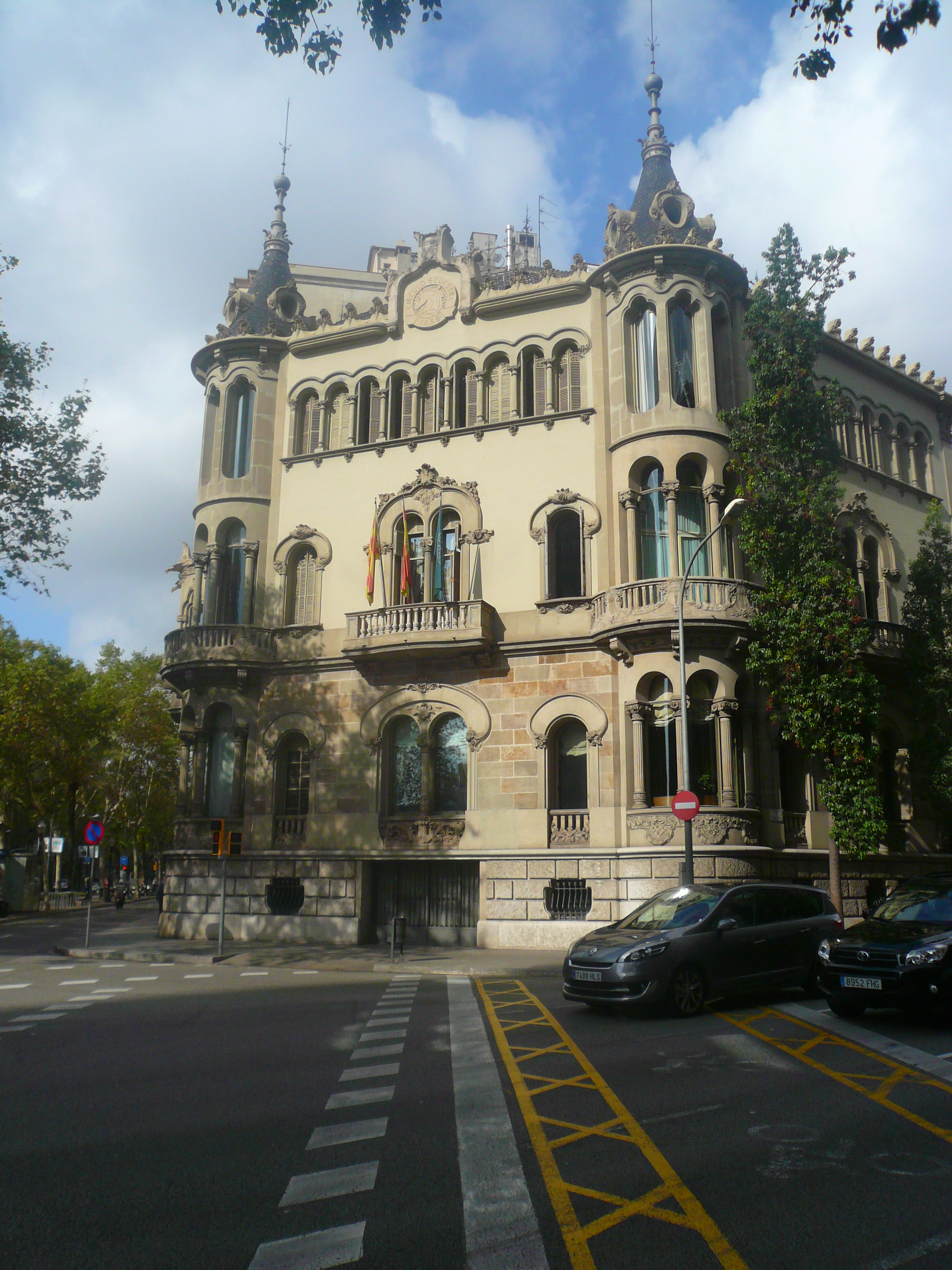
Casa Pérez Samanillo, Barcelona

The collapse of Spanish rule in 1898 did not affect the Pérez business much. However, Luis started to invest in Spain, mostly in Catalonia. In the early 20th century the family permanently settled in a luxury Barcelona residence, managing their overseas economy remotely. They had 9 children, some of them born in the Philippines; Antonio was the youngest one. There is almost no information on his childhood and early teenage years, except that he was raised in Barcelona and very early orphaned by his mother. As in 1911 his father remarried with Asunción Lladó (1884-1963), Antonio was brought up by his step-mother. He studied commerce in an unidentified Jesuit institution; and travelled heavily, accompanying his father during voyages to the Philippines. Later he inherited at least part of the overseas business.

In the late 1920s or very early 1930s Antonio married Sara Moreno Calvo y Ortega (1905-1968). She was the daughter of an Andalusian winegrower and Liberal cacique Guillermo Moreno Calvo; he passed into history when later sub-secretary of the Lerroux cabinet, becoming the key protagonist of the 1935 Nombela affair. The couple settled at calle Muntaner in Barcelona; they had 5 children, all of them sons and all cultivating literary interest of their father in editorial, publishing, theatrical and librarian fields. The best-known of them, Gonzalo Pérez de Olaguer Moreno, became an iconic personality of the Catalan theatre and drama. Antonio lived to see 17 grandchildren.

== Writer ==
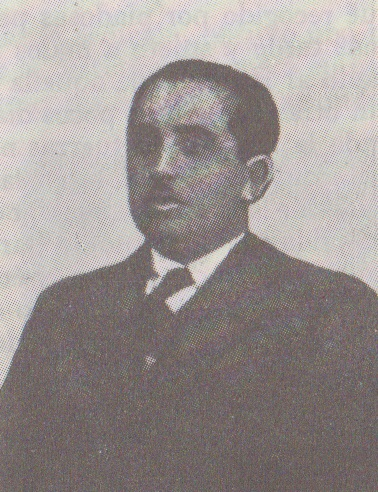
Torralba de Damas

Pérez de Olaguer was a prolific writer and claimed fathering some 50 books. The genre which prevails is non-fiction; it may be subdivided into 4 sub-genres. Pérez de Olaguer commenced literary career in 1926 with travel literature, followed – as he travelled around the world 6 times – with subsequent volumes in 1929, 1934, 1941 and 1944; the last one is an account of truly amazing tour around the world in the midst of the Second World War. Historiography is about three volumes featuring Catholic personalities from the recent past (1933-1940) and a book on his own father (1967). Four volumes of essays anchored in daily life (1950-1953) were written "to cheer up in the dark times". However, Pérez de Olaguer became best known for his works intended to document Republican horror and Nationalist heroism during the Spanish Civil War. He issued 3 volumes discussing Republican atrocities and 2 volumes honoring the Carlist volunteers (1937-1939). The work falling into the same testimonial literature which gained him international recognition was a 1947 work documenting the Japanese barbarity in the Philippines.

Another genre favored by Pérez de Olaguer was novels. They form two distinctly different groups. Four works are marked by grotesque style; except one case the plot is set in contemporary times and the protagonists are involved in twisted intrigues which seem to underline absurdities of daily life, all told in a farcical, optimistic, amusing manner. In terms of content they are benevolent reflections on human confused nature. Entirely different are three novels written during the Civil War. Light message gave way to moralizing objectives related to promotion of the Nationalist cause and grotesque gave way to the horror of wartime setting; what remained was author's optimism and a penchant for a plot anchored in relations between males and females.

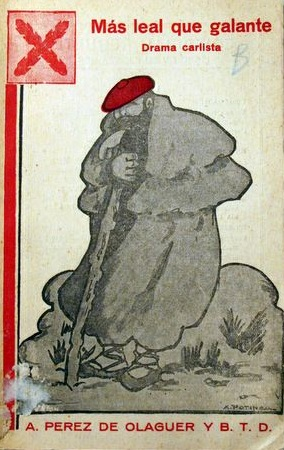

In terms of drama Pérez de Olaguer underwent internship period in the early 1930s; working for Enrique Rambal he co-adapted novels for stage performance, tasked with providing intriguing episodic dramas which merged high action with musical interludes. Likewise he adapted his own novel into a 3-act play (1933), which was actually staged. His greatest success as a playwright came with Más leal que galante (1935), written together with Benedicto Torralba de Damas. Set in the Third Carlist War and written in a light verse, the comedy featured a complex romance intrigue with clear Carlist message in the background; its popularity stemmed from smart and pacy intrigue, well-written rhymed dialogues and a blend of romantic and patriotic features. The play was performed countlessly especially in the Nationalist zone and later in the Francoist Spain; there were great Spanish actors like Carmen Díaz starring and great political personalities like Queipo de Llano attending. Another comedy followed in 1935; it failed to repeat the success, though it was later performed in the Philippines and attended by president Quirino. In the 1950s Pérez de Olaguer kept adapting novels for Rambal and wrote libretto for a zarzuela. Only one of his own late plays was performed commercially; others were one-act dramas performed at amateur or religious stages.

== Publisher, manager, periodista ==
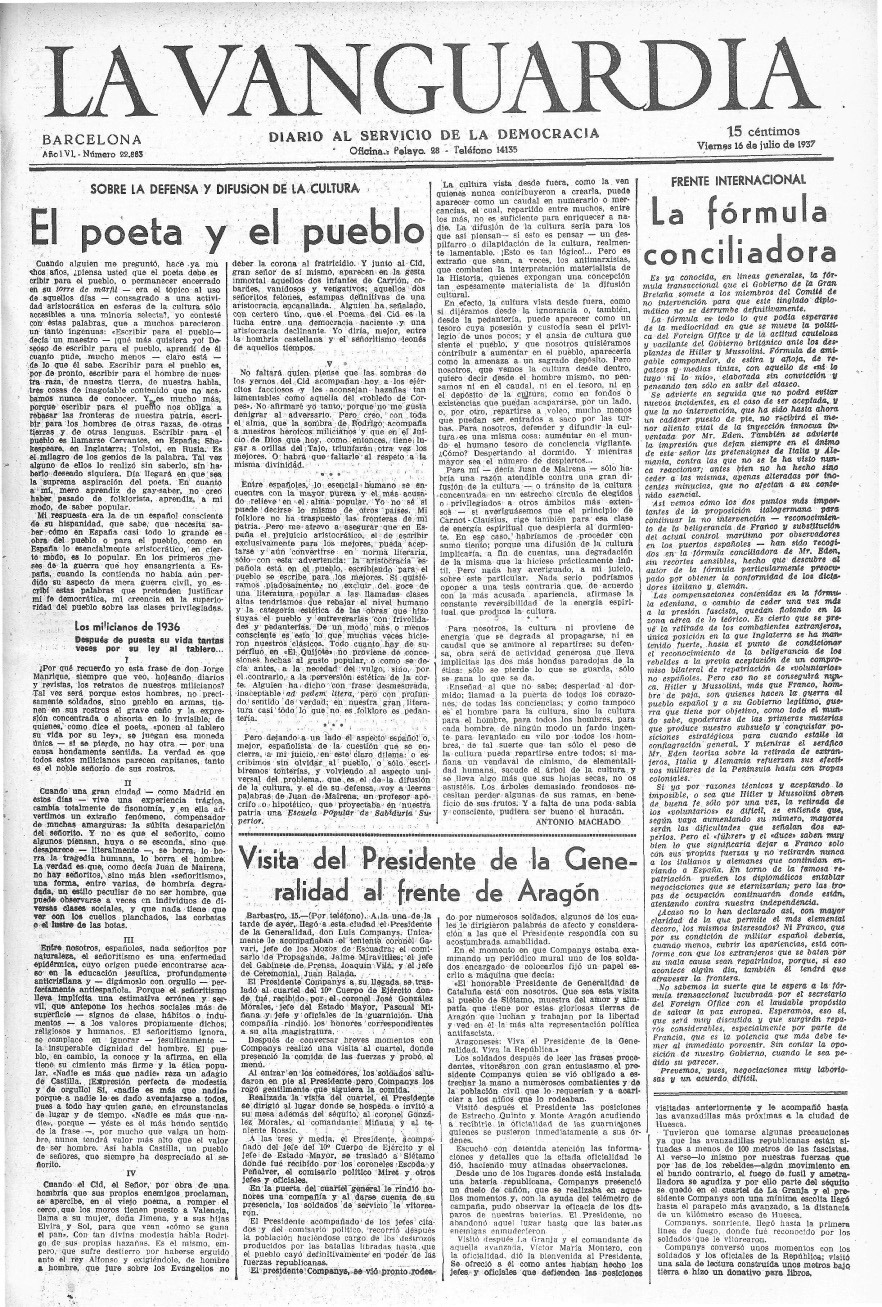
La Vanguardia (1930s)

For some 35 years Pérez de Olaguer remained active in a broadly defined culture; perhaps his most important role was this of a publisher, who animated a number of Catholic cultural initiatives. The key one was La Familia, a Barcelona-based review set up by his father in 1908 and following some periods of lesser activity still issued in the early 1930s. It was at this time that the young Antonio assumed management of the weekly; following the Civil War La Familia, already as his own property, was re-launched and enjoyed its heyday in the 1950s. Pérez de Olaguer kept running the review as its director until the late 1960s; at some stage he tried to build a satellite infrastructure, launching periodical veladas literarias. Until his death La Familia was one of key platforms of popular Catholic culture in Catalonia, though its importance declined as secularization and consumer lifestyles advanced. Other of Pérez de Olaguer's editorial activities were less successful: Traditionalist weekly Alta Veu and humorous reviews Don Fantasma and Guirigay, launched in the mid-1930s, proved short-lived, though Momento kept appearing in 1951-1954.

Pérez de Olaguer himself started contributing to press titles in 1930. He soon commenced co-operation with La Vanguardia and by the board was dubbed "nuestro collaborador". Starting 1933 he kept supplying pieces to established Barcelona reviews La Cruz and especially to Hormiga de Oro though also to minor titles. Initially his contributions were related to his experience as a traveler and later focused also on theatre; starting 1933 they were increasingly flavored with Catholic and Traditionalist outlook. This thread climaxed during the Civil War; once Pérez de Olaguer resumed writing in October 1936 his light and humorous style gave way to serious if not pathetic tone. He kept publishing especially in El Pensamiento Alavés and a Carlist infantile weekly Pelayos; after 1937 his activity decreased. Following the war Pérez de Olaguer contributed to Enciclopedia universal ilustrada europeo-americana, and to Catholic reviews; the popular ones were intended for La Familia, more sophisticated ones were published in Cristiandad; his credo was laid out in a 1957 essay Ante la supuesta inexistencia del escritor católico.

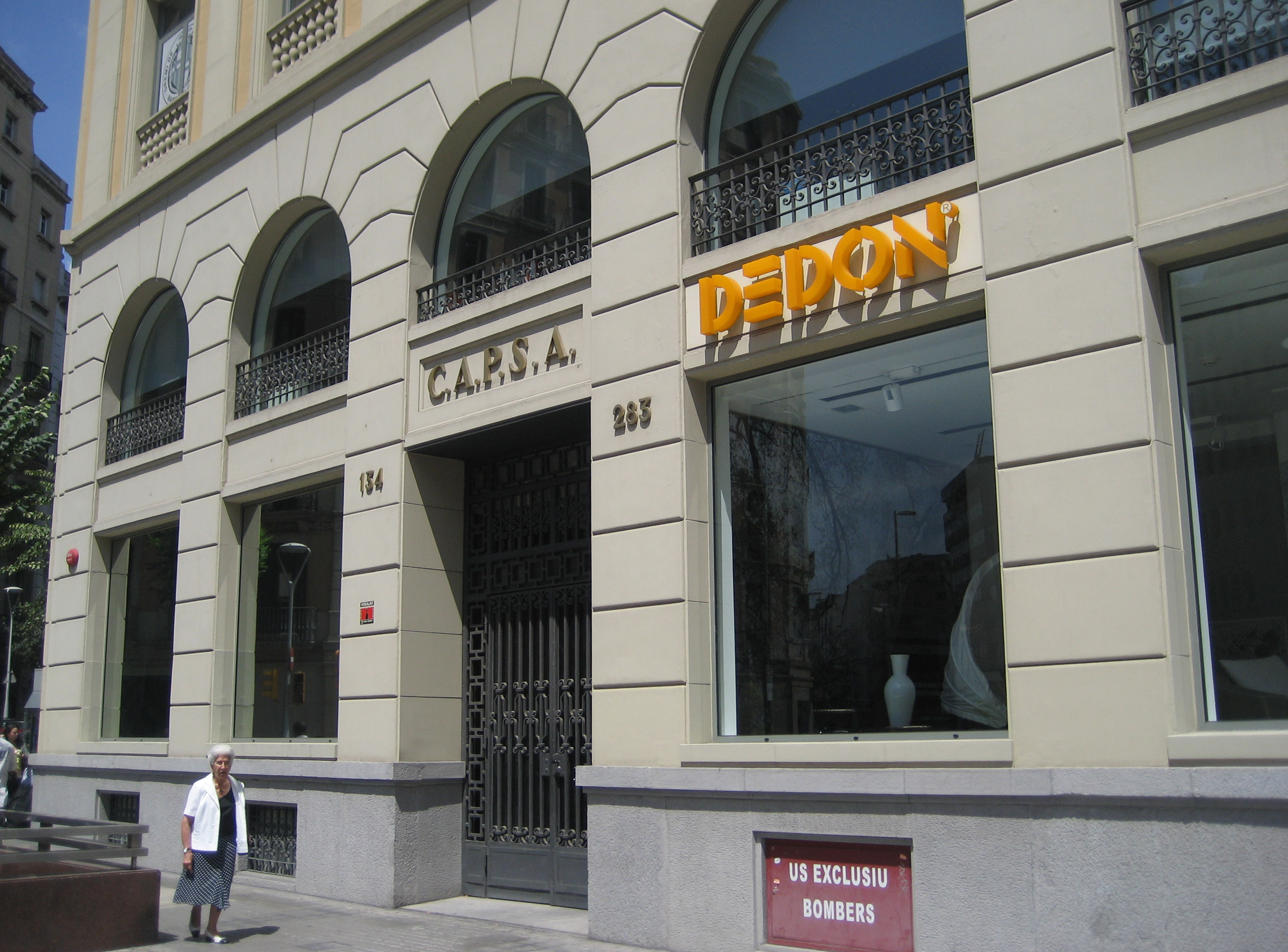
Teatre CAPSA (current view)

In the Francoist era Pérez de Olaguer remained engaged in numerous Catalan Catholic cultural initiatives, those flavored by Traditionalism rather than those advancing a Christian-Democratic outlook. He was the moving spirit behind 1954-co-founded Asociación de San Francisco de Sales, acted in Amigos de Sagrada Familia and Congregaciones Marianas, lectured at Schola Cordis Iesu and galvanized Patronato O.F.O.R.S. In terms of literature he presided over Agrupación Literaria Ibero-Americana; in terms of theatre headed Fomento del Espectáculo Selecto y del Teatro Asociación, contributed to Congreso Regional de Teatro de Aficionados and the CAPSA amateur theatre. In terms of charity he animated Asociación de Amigos de San Lázaro and especially supported Leprocomio de Fontillas, apart from countless other involvements in educational or religious events.

== Carlist: early decades ==
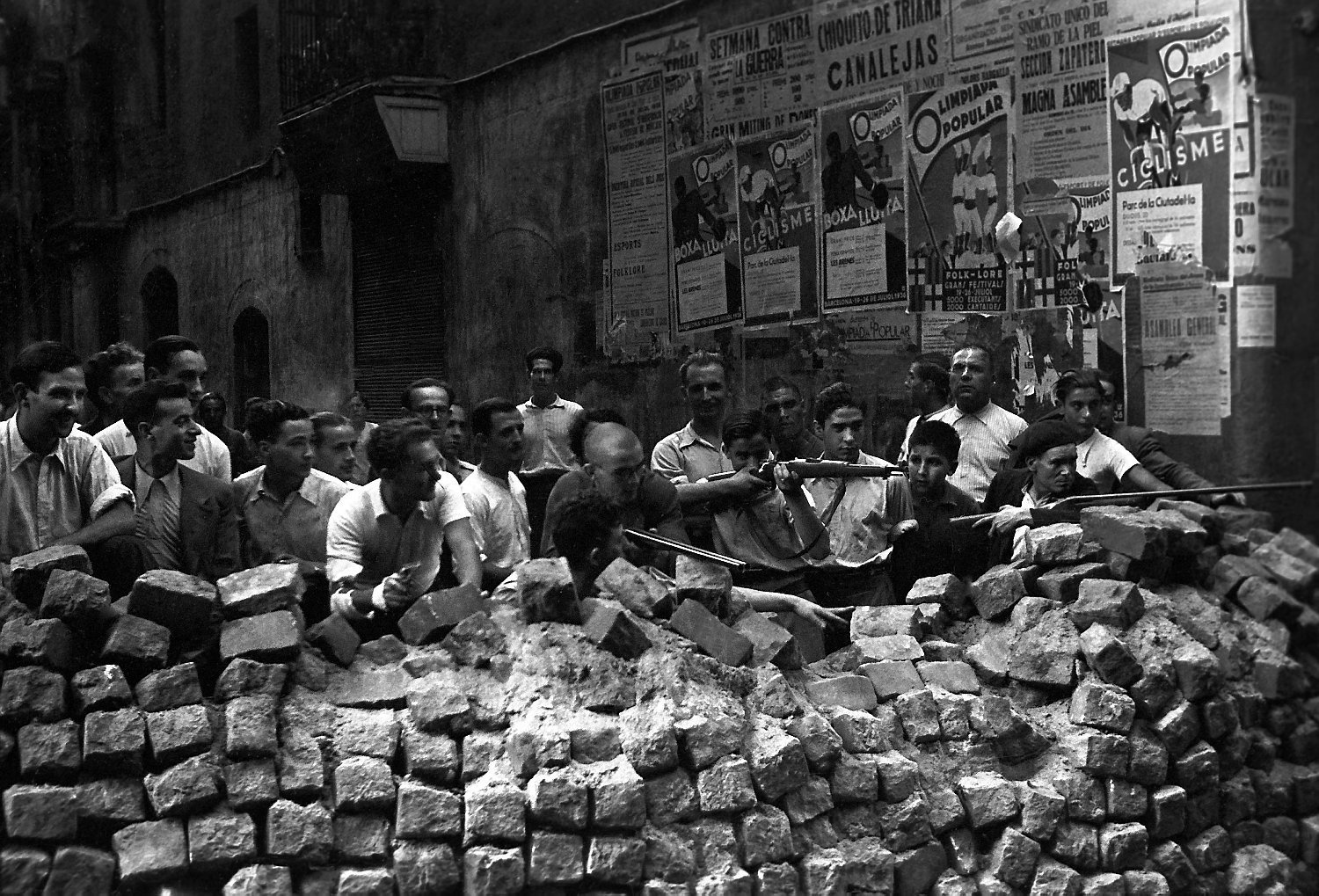
1936 coup in Barcelona

Pérez de Olaguer's ancestors lived mostly overseas and seemed detached from daily Spanish politics; the only information on their preferences available is that his father was a fervent Catholic. The young Antonio initially did not reveal any penchant; it is only in the early 1930s that his writings got saturated with Traditionalism. Exact mechanism of his access to Carlism is not known, yet in 1933 it seemed apparent, perhaps confirmed in 1934. His writings and publications aside there is no confirmation of his engagement in Carlist structures. It is not clear whether Antonio joined requeté military gear-up and whether on July 19 he engaged in the coup. In the mayhem that followed he left Barcelona for Genoa. He entered the Nationalist zone some time before November 1936 and offered his services to Junta Nacional Carlista de Guerra; Pérez de Olaguer was seconded to its Prensa y Propaganda section, touring the area controlled and gathering information on the fallen requetés. He also kept advancing the Carlist cause in numerous books and press publications. His position versus the Unification Decree and buildup of the Francoist regime is not clear; after 1937 his activity as author declined sharply, yet in 1939 Franco watched the victory parade in Barcelona from the balcony of Casa Pérez Samanillo.

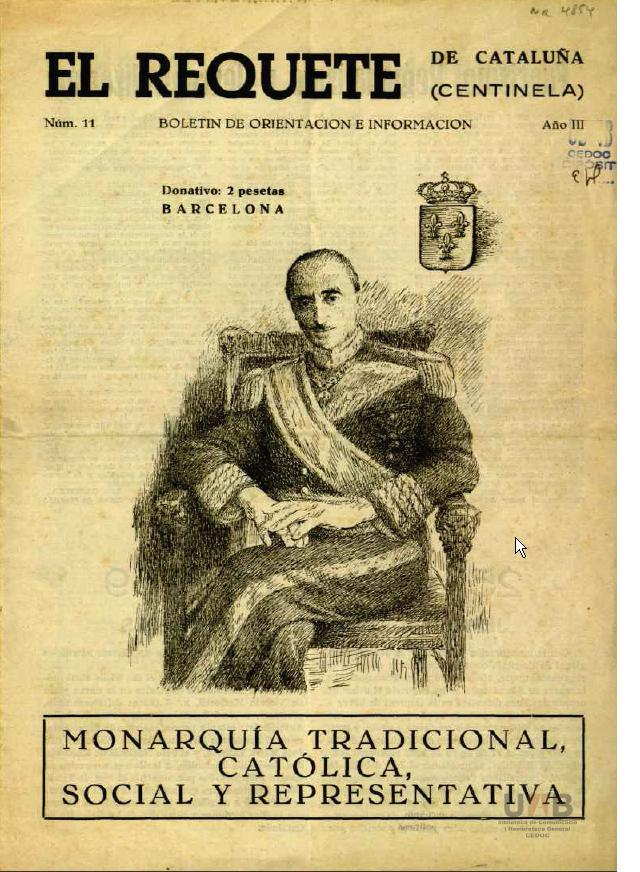
Don Javier, Carlist press

Pérez de Olaguer spent part of the early 1940s overseas and there is no information on his Carlist activities, except hosting Fal Conde during the 1942 Montserrat festivities. During growing bewilderment of Carlism Pérez de Olaguer did not engage in the daily party business yet due to his standing as a writer, though also thanks to his easy-going, serene, and modest conduct he enjoyed great prestige among the Catalan party rank and file. He remained loyal to leadership of Fal and to sovereignty of Don Javier; the regent appreciated him personally. Taking advantage of his position in the mid-1940s Pérez de Olaguer tried to mediate between two increasingly hostile fractions of Catalan Carlists: cautious supporters of Fal Conde, who stuck to the regentialist solution, and activist supporters of regional leader Maurici de Sivatte, who demanded that Don Javier openly challenges Franco and declares his own reign. In 1947 he addressed the claimant with a letter, asking to take action and prevent forthcoming breakup. Himself he tended to side with the Sivattistas, noting that Spain needed "legitimate chief of state". Don Javier took notice but did not take action and the conflict escalated. In early 1949 Fal travelled to Barcelona seeking last-minute reconciliation, but Pérez de Olaguer informed him that "por aquel camino el carlismo no podía continuar". Few months later in another letter he advocated more open anti-Francoist stand and noted that caudillo's fate might be this of Hitler and Mussolini. However, Fal's strategy prevailed and Sivatte was dismissed from the Catalan jefatura.

== Carlist: late decades ==
Carlist standard

Pérez de Olaguer remained embittered about Sivatte's dismissal and protested to Fal; however, while Sivatte soon distanced himself from the party, for Pérez de Olaguer obedience towards Don Javier remained an untouchable principle. The Catalan Carlists held him in high esteem and suggested that it is Pérez de Olaguer who becomes the regional jefe; however, despite insistence on part of the regent Pérez declined the offer, pledging instead that he would work to unite all Catalan Carlists. Indeed, he did, and the early 1950s are marked by his efforts to this end. Unwavering in his loyalty to Don Javier he kept challenging the regency formula. The campaign produced success in 1953; Don Javier issued a vague document, hailed by Consejo de Comunión Tradicionalista as claim of monarchic rights; their communiqué was co-signed by Pérez de Olaguer. The move triggered what looked like rapprochement between Javieristas and Sivattistas; it climaxed when two groups, since 1949 staging 2 separate Montserrat feasts, agreed to have one, very much the result of Pérez de Olaguer's conciliatory work.

In 1956 Pérez de Olaguer together with Sivatte met Don Javier in Perpignan to discuss further alignment and prevent would-be dynastic accord with Don Juan; the Carlist king signed appropriate statement but insisted it is kept private. The document was to be stored by Sivatte but Don Javier soon developed second thoughts and demanded it is to be in custody of Pérez de Olaguer, the king's trusted man in Catalonia. To his great surprise, Sivatte made the Perpignan pledge public during the meeting of Carlist executive in Estella, which heavily damaged Don Javier's relations with Pérez de Olaguer. However, when in 1957 Sivatte launched an openly rebellious Carlist grouping known as RENACE Pérez de Olaguer did not join, in the late 1950s limiting himself to maintaining friendly relations with Sivatte and his collaborators, like Carles Feliu de Travy. His general stand seemed constant; basking in prestige among Catalan Carlists he did not engage in any party activity yet did engage in common, mostly religion-flavored initiatives.

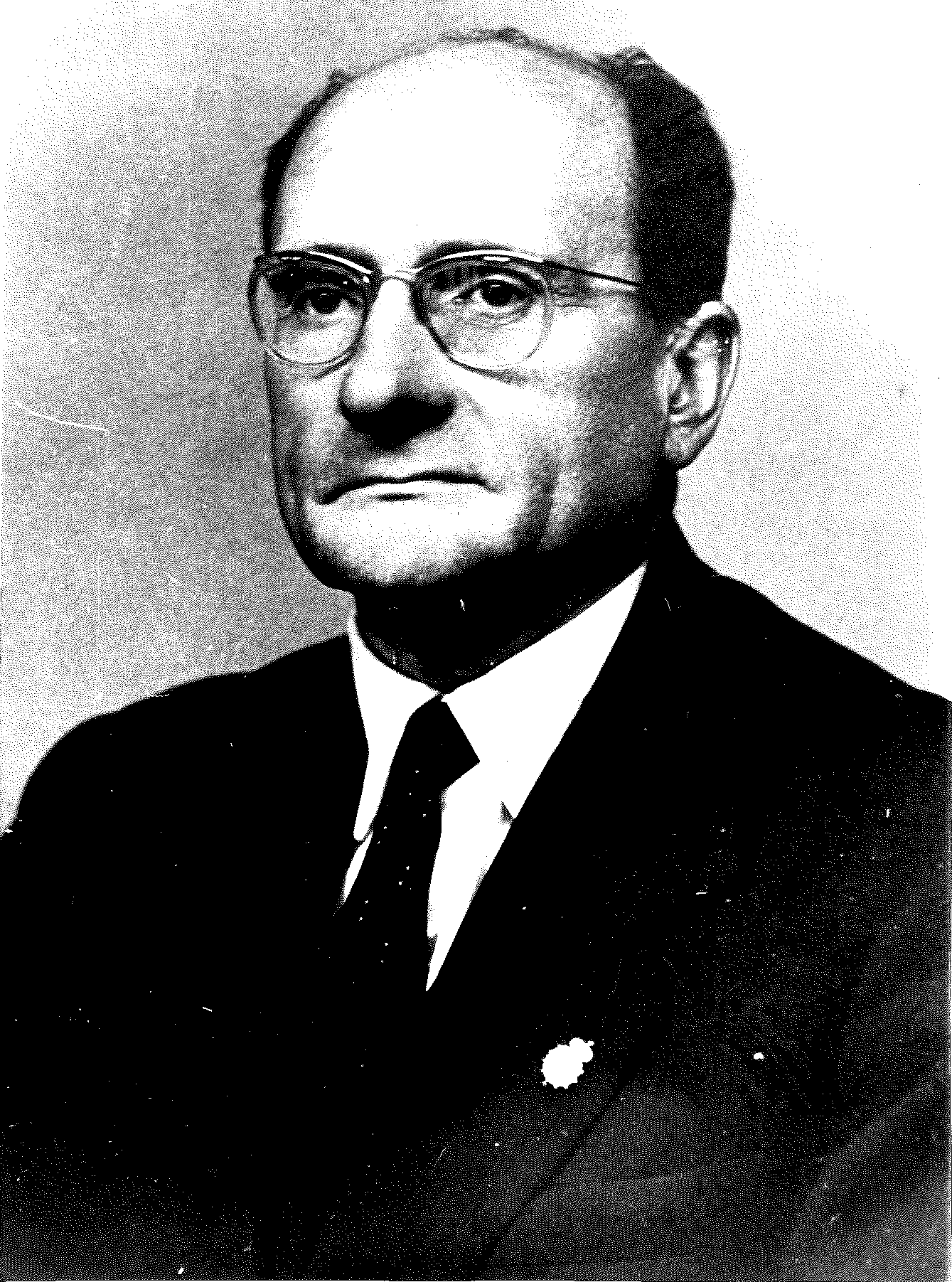
Mauricio de Sivatte

Pérez de Olaguer avoided entanglements in Francoist structures though he used to meet high regional officials of the regime, be it provincial civil governor, capitán general or alcalde. The purpose of these meetings is not clear; it seems he represented various non-political institutions seeking assistance. However, in the early 1960s Pérez de Olaguer started to demonstrate that also politically he sort of acknowledged the stability of Francoist setting. During local elections of 1963 he lent his support to one Carlist candidate and in the Cortes elections of 1967 to another. Following 30 years of the regime his trust in instauration of the Traditionalist monarchy decayed; in a 1966 letter to Don Javier he diagnosed that "el Carlismo, más dividido que nunca, más lleno de rencor que en otras ocasiones, languidece, y por paradoja sólo diríase alimentado, vivificado, por los antiguos partidarios de Sivatte". He repaired relations with the house of Borbón-Parma and hosted Don Carlos Hugo and his wife Irene in his house during their mid-1960s interview with Sivatte; it is not clear whether he shared Sivatte's damning opinion about the prince.

== Reception and legacy ==
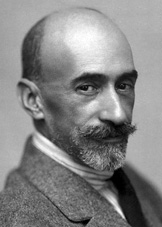
Jacinto Benavente

Pérez de Olaguer's early attempts were acknowledged with patronizing tone; critics admitted potential, unbiased fresh look and writing ease yet stayed cautious and some alluded to a premature debut, though Jacinto Benavente approvingly prologued his 1934 volume. Pérez de Olaguer gained some attention due to his grotesque novels and plays; commended for gracious style, original humor and optimistic humanism they were placed in the farcical tradition of Rabelais or Molière. In the mid-1930s his works started to collect praise in conservative realm, which noted Christian spirit and Traditionalist vision. Más leal que galante earned Pérez de Olaguer great popularity among the Carlists; in 1935 he was already invited as a literary arbiter and received homages. During the Civil War and early Francoism Pérez de Olaguer emerged among more popular writers; some of his works were re-printed 4 times, Más leal was continuously staged commercially and occasionally he kept attending literary juries. He remained an author catering to popular taste and was rewarded by the public rather than by critics and awards. Starting mid-1950s his literary production declined as he focused on Catholic Barcelona reviews instead. Since their circulation remains unknown also their impact remains to be gauged, yet it seems that La Familia counted among key platforms of popular Catalan Catholicism.

After his death Pérez de Olaguer went into oblivion; none of his works has been re-published. In the post-Francoist era the skyrocketing popularity of Gonzalo Pérez de Olaguer – never referred to as the son of Antonio – has entirely eclipsed the memory of his father. Pérez de Olaguer has not made it to history of the Spanish literature and is disregarded not only in synthetic accounts but also ignored or barely mentioned in detailed studies. If referred, he merits scholarly attention as a representative of cultural outlook of early Francoism rather than as an individual. Scholars quote his name when presenting typical features, clichés and traits of Francoist culture, and if admitted importance it is only because some counted him among key contributors to or "más destacados cultivadores" of most characteristic cultural features in the nationalist zone. The ones listed are: lambasting the Republicans as foreign-inspired anti-Spain, depicting them as bestial brutes, disseminating the vision of judeo-masonic plot, idealizing own heroic men, constructing the Cruzada logic, building a myth of Traditionalist Navarre, bending historical truth to serve own political preferences and cultivating sex stereotypes. His individual literary contribution is dismissed as "cuentos escritos en un tono didáctico-moralizante".

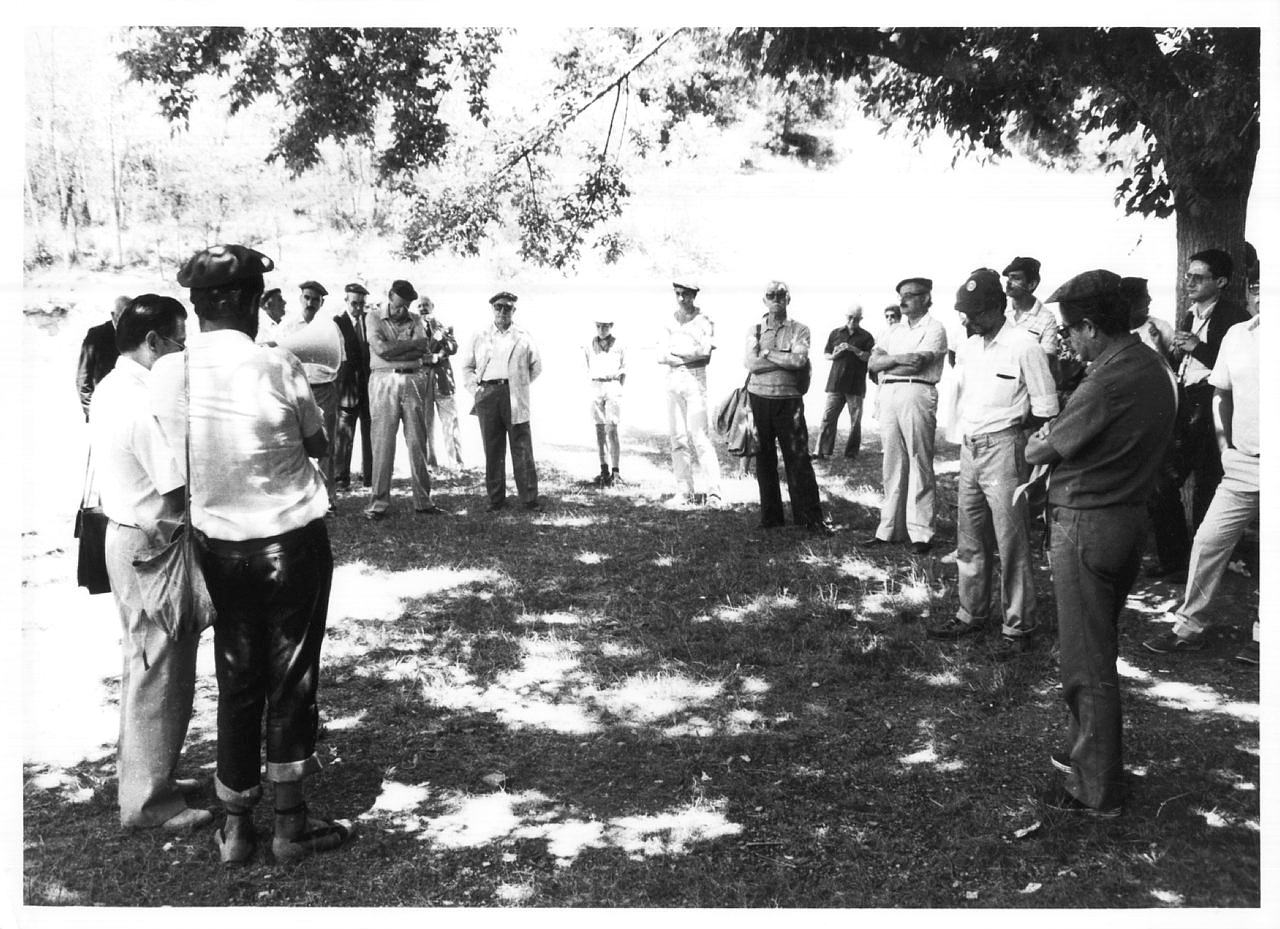
Catalan Carlists, 1986

In the Carlist realm Pérez de Olaguer is occasionally recorded on private blogs and official Comunión Tradicionalista sites. His testimonial literature on Republican terror was widely quoted during the Francoist era. As a documentary it has not been proven incorrect until today; at times it remains quoted by scholars though they usually stigmatize Pérez de Olaguer as a Nationalist partisan, a source which "does not inspire confidence" or "ideologically committed lay Catholic". Internationally he was acknowledged mostly thanks to work on Japanese atrocities in the Philippines and until today the volume is considered "deeply and broadly researched platform" that every scholarly investigation of the issue must commence with.

== See also ==
- Traditionalism (Spain)
- Carlism
- Carlism in literature
- Maurici de Sivatte i de Bobadilla
