= Ignacio Romero Raizábal =

Spanish writer (1901–1975)

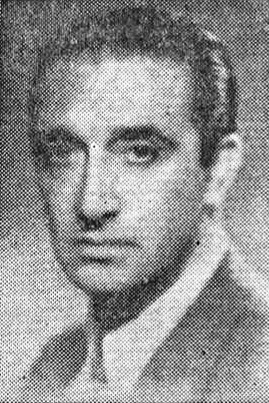
- Born: 1901; Santander, Spain
- Died: 1975 (aged 73–74); Santander, Spain
- Occupation: Dentist
- Known for: Writer
- Political party: Carlism

Ignacio Romero Raizábal (1901-1975) was a Spanish writer and a Carlist activist. In the 1930s in Cantabria he gained some local recognition as a poet, while in the early Francoist era he was moderately known nationwide as the author of novels and historiographic accounts; he published some 35 volumes in total. In the 1930s he headed a Traditionalist review Tradición; during the post-war period he contributed mostly to Carlist periodicals, especially the daily El Pensamiento Navarro and the monthly Montejurra. He did not engage in politics, though he briefly served as secretary to the regent-claimant Don Javier and was one of key Carlist propagandists. Since the early 1960s, when the movement was subject to struggle for domination between traditionalists and progressists, Romero assumed an in-between position.

== Family and youth ==
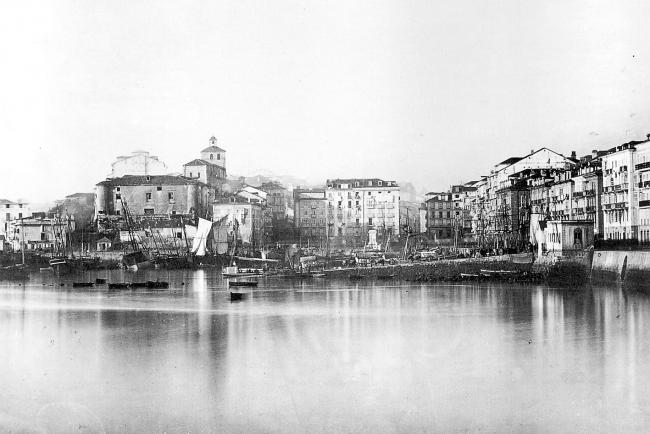
Santander, late 19th c.

None of the sources consulted provides any information on Romero's distant ancestors. It appears that his paternal grandparents were related to Madrid, but there is nothing known about them. His father Justo Romero Magro was born probably in the early 1870s and died prematurely in the late 1900s. He practiced as a dentist; in the mid-1890s as a young doctor he reportedly earned his name in Madrid and served at the Spanish royal court, though details are not clear. In 1896 he married Josefa Raizábal Legorburu (died 1941), the native of Santander; she was daughter to a recognized local dental surgeon and professor, Ramón Raizábal. The latter suggested that the son-in-law moves to the Cantabrian capital so that they could practice together. The newly-wed couple indeed settled in Santander; after Romero Magro got his credentials confirmed by the local authorities in 1897, he started practicing and then opened his own dentist's office.

Justo and Josefa had 4 children, born at the turn at the centuries: two sons and two daughters. The oldest son, Ignacio Romero Raizábal, perished in 1899 at 9 months of age; his younger brother was named after him. The oldest daughter María de los Angeles married in 1927; her sister Pilar married in 1932; she was assassinated during the revolutionary turmoil in Santander in December 1936. Following the death of Justo the widow took over the dentist's office; she was one of the first women practicing and has even attended scientific congresses. The half-orphaned children were brought up in a very pious way; Romero's maternal grandfather was a Franciscan tertiary and Romero's maternal aunt became a nun in the Carmelite order.

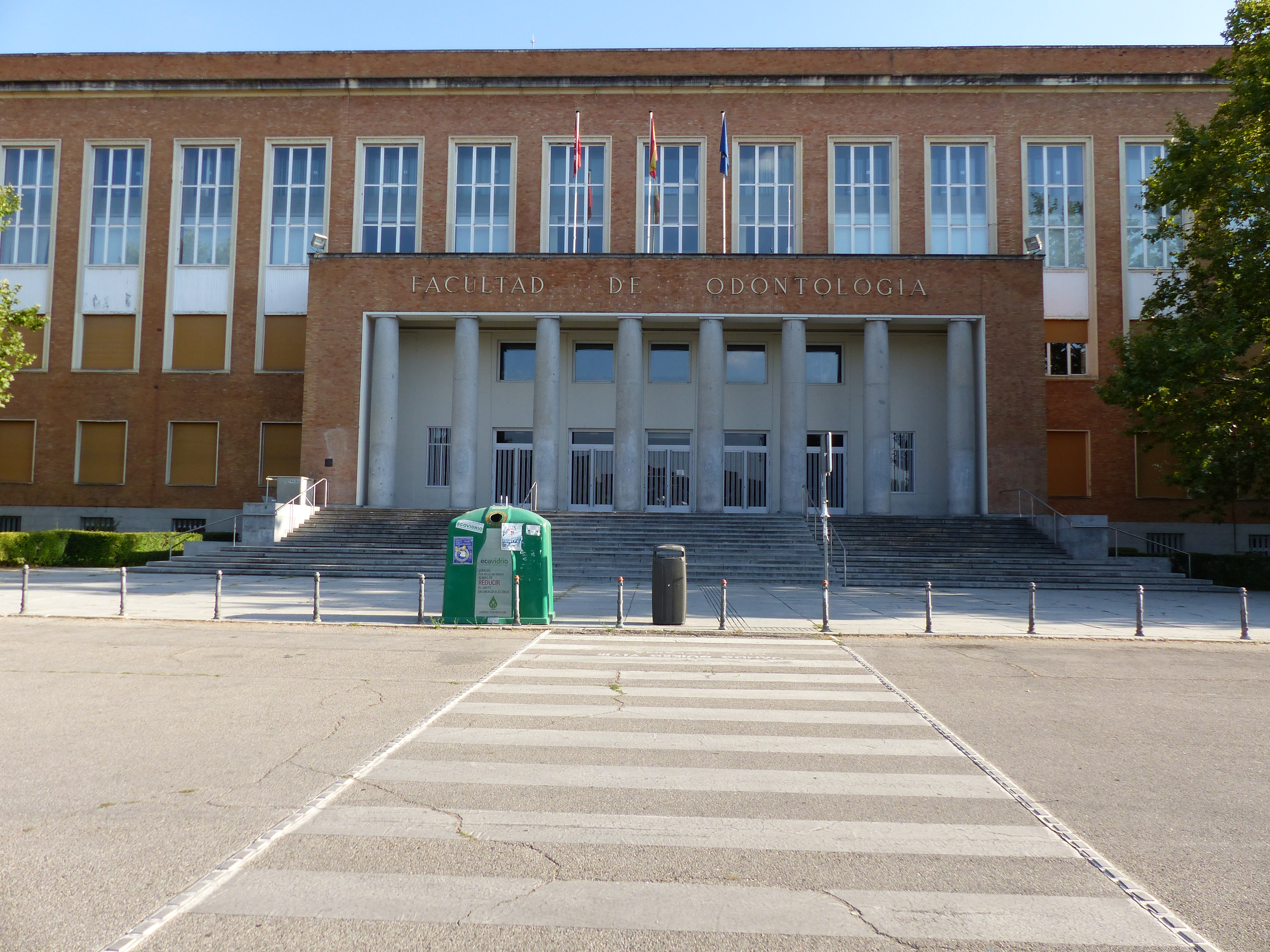
odontologia at Complutense today

Details of Romero's early education are not clear and it is not known what schools he frequented. At the turn of the 1910s and the 1920s he moved to Madrid and commenced studies at Facultad de Odontologia of Universidad Central; he graduated in 1925. At unspecified time he did the obligatory military service. At some point he worked as assistant to the famous odontologist Florestán Aguilar Rodríguez; later he returned to Santander and opened his own dentist practice no later than in 1928; he practiced until 1974. In 1931 Romero married María Rosa Arche Aguirre (died after 1974) from La Cavada in Riotuerto county near Santander, daughter to a local modest landowner. The couple had two children, both of them sons. The first one, Ignacio Romero Arche, died in 1936 at the age of 4. The younger son, Carlos Romero Arche, did not become a public figure. Neither any of the 3 grandsons from the Romero Korndorffer family is recognized nationally.

== Writer ==
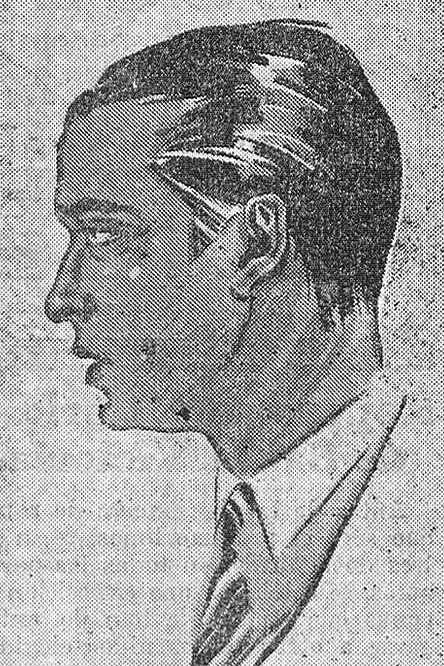
Romero as young poet

Already during his college days Romero penned few dramas. In the late 1910s and early 1920s he was reciting own poems in Catholic círculos; most revolved around religious topics. In 1924 he won first local poetic awards and the same year his poem appeared in a nationwide newspaper. In 1925 Romero published his first poetic volume, Un alto en el camino. In 1928 it was followed by Montón de besos, issued in very limited edition and intended for friends only. The subsequent volumes were La novia coqueta, prologued by Ramón de Solano y Polanco (1928) and Los tres cuernos de satanás (1929); all explored mostly Christian and amorous themes and adhered to serene and popular tone. Boinas rojas (1933) produced a turn to history with emphasis on loyalty and male virtues, with return to previous lyrical and somewhat lighter tone in Rosario de amor (1934) and El cancionero de la Novia formal (1935). Wartime events triggered collections marked by religious and patriotic flavor, En el nombre del Padre (1936) and Cancionero carlista (1938); the last one proved his most popular poetic volume and came out in 3 editions.

In the late 1930s Romero parted the poetic muse and turned to prose. In 1938 he published his first and best-known novel, La promesa del tulipán; its protagonist is a sybarite who undergoes evolution before he volunteers to requeté and finds reward, also in matters of the heart. The author returned to prose with brief Alma en otoño (1944) and Inés Tenorio (1947), the latter a historical variation of the Don Juan theme. Almas distantes (1949) featured two artists facing quasi-apocalyptical disaster embodied in the great fire of Santander, while Como hermanos (1951) again exploited the wartime past. El príncipe requeté (1965), was in fact a veiled documentary account dwelling on Civil War deeds of the Carlist prince, Gaetano Borbón-Parma; in order not to challenge the Francoist censorship, the author formatted the work as literary fiction.

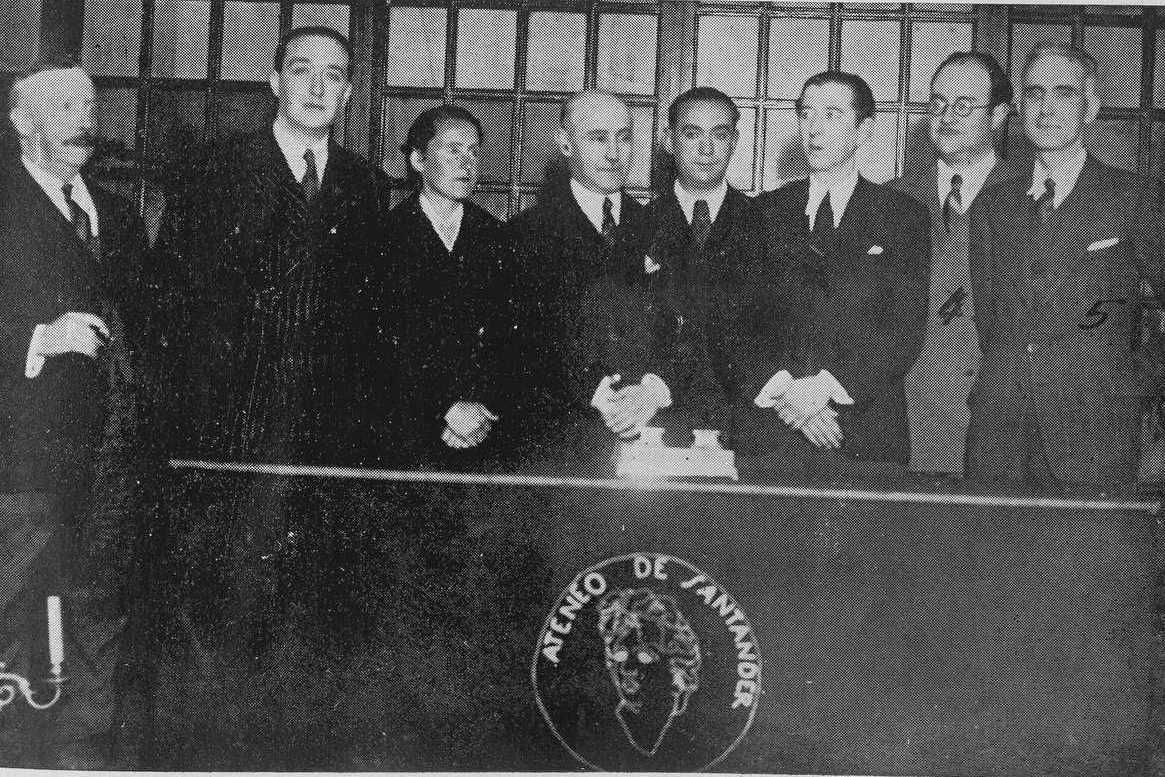
Romero (2fL) among Cantabrian writers, Santander 1936

Apart from poems and novels, Romero wrote also documentary and essayistic works. Chronologically the first one is Boinas Rojas en Austria (1936), covering the journey of the author and the Carlist executive to the funeral of Don Alfonso Carlos. Regalo de la boda (1939) was collection of his earlier Tradición articles, La paloma que venció a la serpiente (1943) was a set of essays on Cristero war in Mexico, while Sendero de luz (1948) and A la hora de la Salve (1950) were pieces on religious topics. Heroes de romance, 25 hombres en fila (both 1952) and Era un monje perfecto (1954) are attempts in psychology and contain short individual portraits of persons related to Carlism or religion. Altar y trono (1960, re-worked and re-issued in 1968 as El carlismo en el Vaticano) is a loose historiographic attempt to reconstruct relations between Carlist kings and Vatican, while El prisionero de Dachau 156.270 (1972) is a set of hagiographic essays revolving around Don Javier and his lot during World War Two.

== Periodista ==
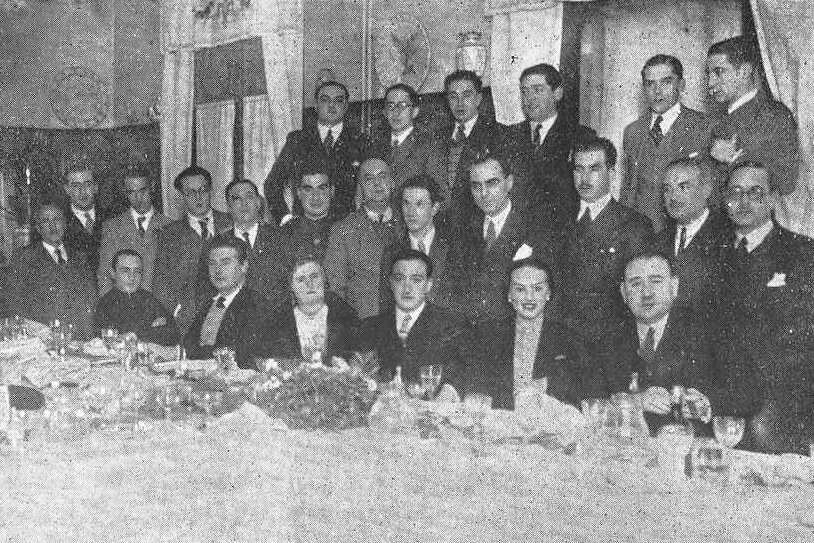
Tradición editorial board, 1934 (Romero sitting in the middle)

Romero's press career commenced in the 1920s, when his single poems appeared first in local Cantabrian dailies and then in the nationwide Integrist newspaper El Siglo Futuro. At the turn of the decades he started to publish poetry in an ambitious literary review Revista de Santander. His most challenging task, however, commenced in 1932, when with a group of friends he decided to launch a high-level Traditionalist review, “más formativa que informativa, mejor dogmática que gráfica”. It materialized as “revista quincenal de orientación política” Tradición, based in Santander, and with Romero as its director. Since 1933 the bi-weekly was issued by Comunión Tradicionalista de Montaña, the provincial Cantabrian Carlist organisation, and since 1935 it became “organó del Consejo de Cultura”, sort of official Carlist periodical supposed to provide ideological guidance. There were 50 issues printed until August 1935, though paradoxically, having been incorporated into the nationwide party media machinery it turned from a bi-weekly to a monthly. Romero remained its editor-in-chief until the end and maintained a very ambitious profile of Tradición; he contributed almost every second issue, steered clear of heated ideological or political questions and focused on literature, history of Traditionalism or exaltation of the Carlist dynasty. It is not clear why Tradición ceased to publish in mid-1935.

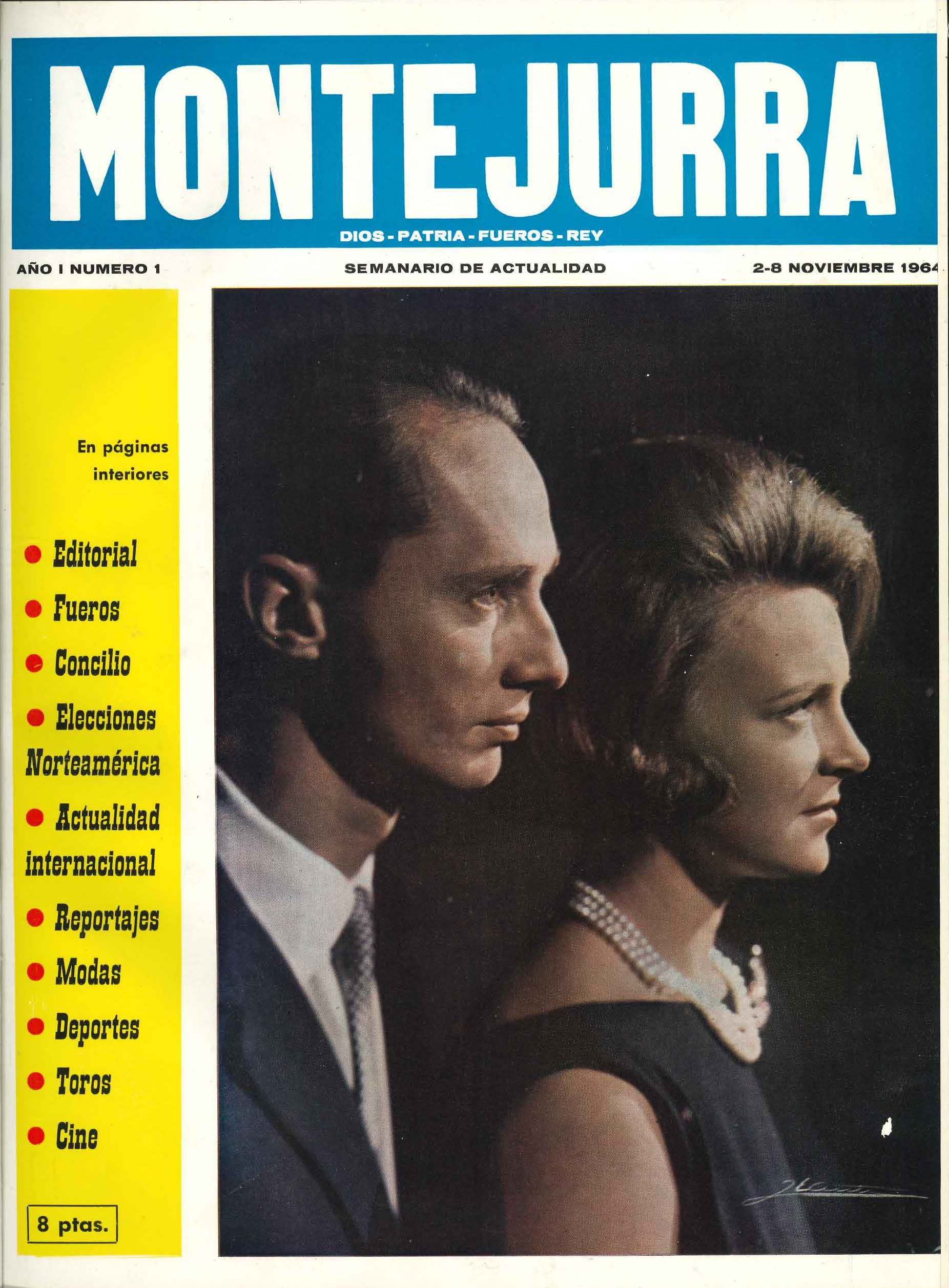
Montejurra front page

In 1936-1939 Romero published rather few pieces in various titles; initially they included the Falangist Labor but later they were only unification-spared and Traditionalism-flavored titles like the Pamplona-based El Pensamiento Navarro or the Vitoria-based El Pensamiento Alavés. During early Francoism his name ceased to appear in the press; some authors claim he was member of the editorial board or even the co-manager of the Catholic daily Ya, but this information is not confirmed elsewhere. In the 1950s his single articles – usually revolving around literary or historical topics - sporadically appeared in El Pensamiento Navarro or El Correo Catalán. In the 1960s, when the conciliatory turn of Carlist policy towards the regime produced some concessions on part of the administration and few new Carlist periodicals appeared on the market, Romero started contributing. The most important of these titles is the illustrated review Montejurra, where he turned one of the most prolific authors; he focused almost exclusively on history. However, Romero's articles were appearing also in more niche party periodicals, like Azada y asta and Esfuerzo común. In case of the latter, an ambitious Zaragoza-based strongly left-leaning doctrinal monthly, sort of Tradición à rebours, he even entered the editorial board in the early 1970s. It is not clear whether he realized its agenda and to what extent he approved of its line.

== Carlist (until 1936) ==
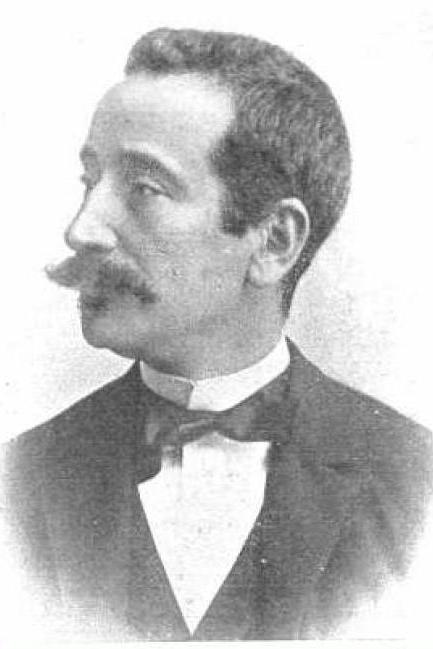
Nocedal

Ignacio's father Justo Romero was related to Integrism and his son inherited this political outlook. During his academic years in Madrid in the early 1920s he was member of Juventud Integrista de Madrid and in the mid-1920s he penned an exalted poem in honor of the late Integrist leader, Ramón Nocedal. There is no trace of his strictly political activity until the very late monarchy. In local elections of April 1931 he ran as “monárquico” and “católico” to the Santander town hall but narrowly failed. In May 1931, following instauration of the republic, as a reserve second lieutenant he refused to take oath to the new regime and was crossed out from the service list. At the time the Integrists, in the 1880s a breakaway branch of Carlism, were re-integrating within the movement; Romero followed suit. When in the fall of 1931 the Alfonsist and Carlist representatives held secret talks about would-be rebellion against the republican regime, one of the meetings was staged in Romero's Santander home, though there is no information on his specific role. In late 1931 he already took part in a joint Traditionalist banquet, yet still formatted as a homage to the Integrist journalist, Manuel Senante.

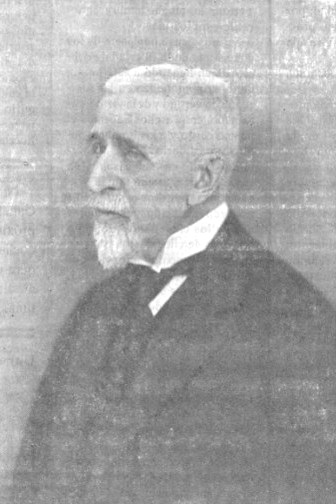
Alfonso Carlos, 1930s

In the early 1930s Romero started to emerge as sort of Carlist authority on culture. This was so partially thanks to the 1932 launch of Tradición, initially his private initiative. However, the impact of this sublime intellectual review was incomparable to impact of the 1933 release of his poetic volume Boinas rojas, a tribute to Carlist paramilitary and military deeds; almost overnight it elevated Romero to the status of a top Carlist poet. Following the 1934 ascent of another former Integrist Manuel Fal Conde to political leadership of Comunión Tradicionalista, Tradición was made official mouthpiece of Consejo de la Tradición, the party's doctrinal body, and reportedly Romero entered this council himself. He started to tour the country, e.g. Romero delivered an address during a grand Carlist rally near Seville; the story was later discussed in detail in his review. At times he demonstrated zeal which bordered grotesque; e.g. his 1934 article dedicated to the claimant Alfonso Carlos was dated “17 de Abril del año 101 de la Era Carlista”. His newly born son was named Carlos in honor of the Carlist king; Romero came to know him personally when the octogenarian started to spend winters in southern France, near the Spanish frontier. It is not clear whether Romero took part in internal debates related to the party strategy, though his articles demonstrated a penchant for “Catholic unity” and at times contained barely veiled insurgent anti-republican tone. Prior to the 1936 elections Romero employed his pen to support the fellow Cantabrian Carlist and also an ex-Integrist, José Luis Zamanillo.

== Carlist (war) ==
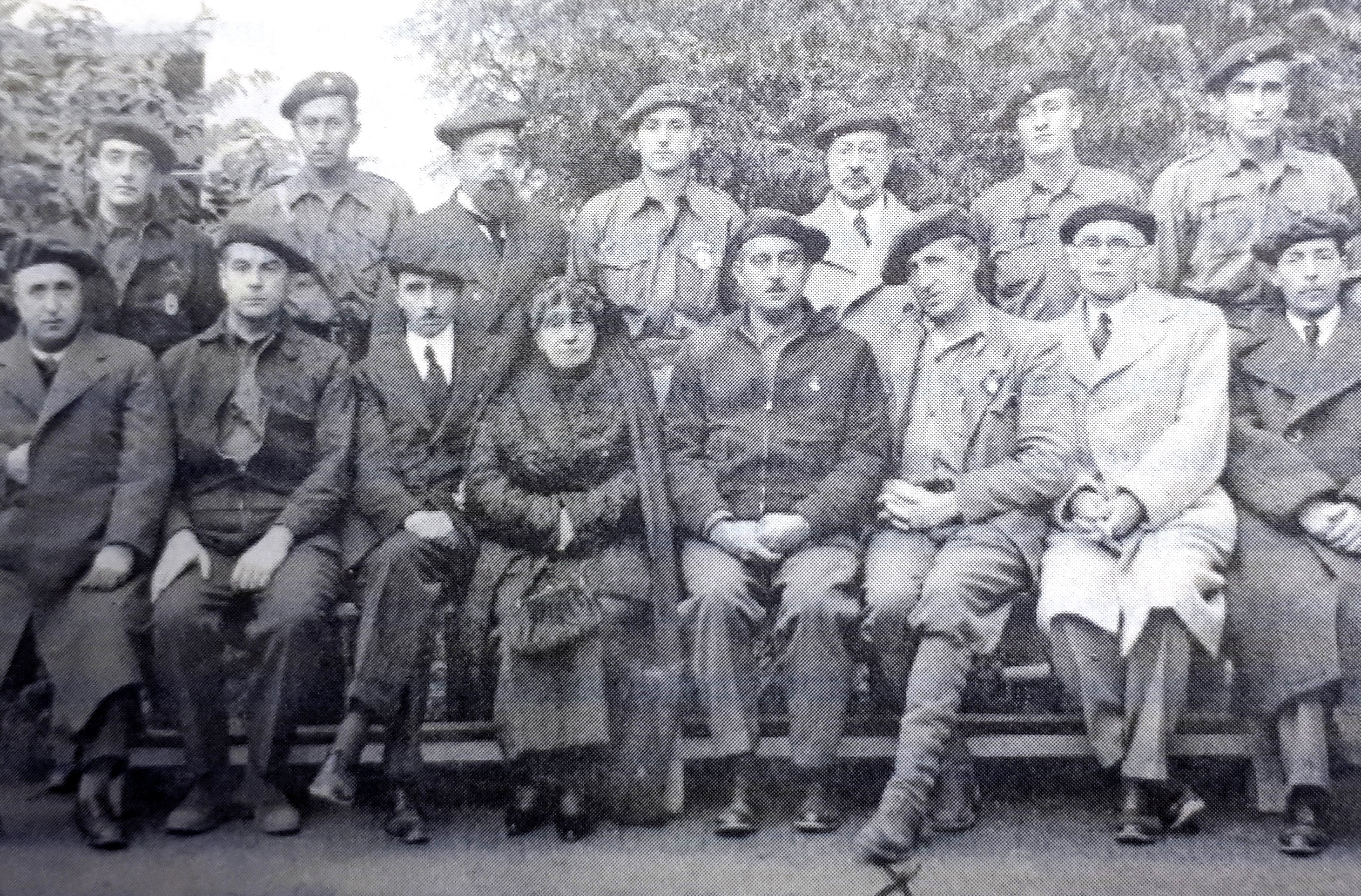
in Vienna, October 1936

It is not clear whether Romero was involved in the Carlist conspiracy unfolding in the spring and early summer of 1936 or whether he was even aware of it. He was rather occupied by deteriorating health of his oldest son; the 4-year-old died on July 13, 1936, and the funeral took place one day before the coup commenced. Romero's whereabouts during few early weeks of the conflict are not known. In early September the Santander police commander demanded that he shows up at the nearest station or be declared a rebel. Later that month he was in Burgos, in the Nationalist zone, but his wife and other relatives remained in the Republican-held Cantabria. Though Romero was not member of Carlist wartime executive or any of its affiliated institutions, in early October 1936 he accompanied top party leaders who travelled from Spain via France and Switzerland to attend the funeral of Don Alfonso Carlos in Vienna. His written account of the journey, which was also an attempt to idolize Fal Conde, was later the same year published by the Carlist Delegación de Prensa y Propaganda; fairly popular, it was re-issued in the second edition of 1938.

Either in October 1936 or shortly afterwards Romero became secretary to the new Carlist regent-claimant Don Javier, resident in the French Saint-Jean-de-Luz. In this role he took part in the February 1937 meeting in the Portuguese Ínsua, when the party executive gathered to discuss strategy towards growing political unification pressure on part of the military; accounts from this meeting do not note him as a protagonist. In the summer of 1937 as Don Javier's secretary he talked to a number of envoys from Spain, like Eladio Esparza. Some sources claim that he served also as secretary to Gaetano Borbón-Parma, though other accounts suggest that he merely interviewed the prince and perhaps helped him to navigate across northern Spain.

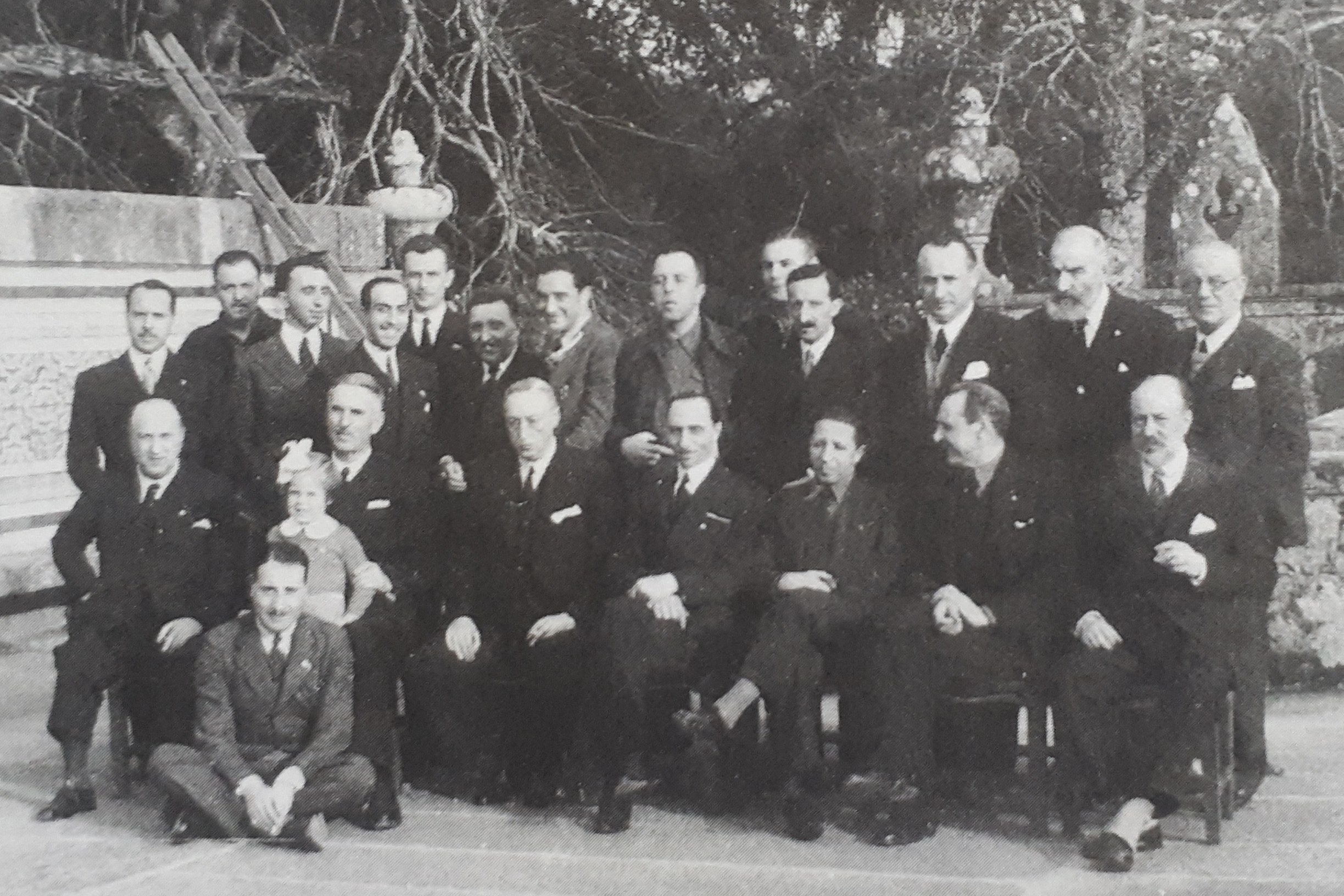
in Insua, February 1937

Romero's service at the regent's office in Saint-Jean-de-Luz lasted around a year, but it is not clear whether following the Nationalist takeover of Cantabria he returned to Santander in late 1937. As late as in July 1938 he appeared as witness during a Bordeaux trial of a Republican militia commander from Santander Manuel Neila, apprehended in France. Romero claimed wrongly that the defendant was responsible for death of his mother and 2 sisters; in fact, his mother and one sister survived the war. Also in 1938 and already with approval of the Francoist censorship he published the poetic volume Cancionero carlista and his best-known novel, La promesa del tulipán; both celebrated the Carlist wartime military effort.

== Carlist (Francoism) ==
Carlist standard

There is no information on Romero's engagement in Carlist structures during early Francoism and even his literary production – save Héroes de romance (1952), dedicated to requetés – evolved mostly around religious topics or episodes from distant past. It is not known how he viewed the change in Carlist strategy, dismissal of Fal Conde and the new, conciliatory course, adopted by the movement in the mid-1950s. However, he maintained links with numerous personalities, including Don Javier, and was gradually getting involved in efforts to install his son, prince Carlos Hugo, in Spain. Romero viewed him in rather sympathetic terms, as “muy sonriente y cariñoso como es norma en los Borbón Parma”, even though he was somewhat skeptical about the mediatic strategy adopted by young entourage of the prince. In 1962 Romero accompanied Carlos Hugo to El Pardo prior to his interview with Franco. In the early 1960s Romero noted that the secretariat of the prince formed an impenetrable wall around him, but he thought it a tactical requirement of the new times. He viewed the invasion of young activists on top Carlist offices as a rather welcome emergence of “nueva ola del carlismo”.

The years of 1963-1964 produced a showdown between the Carlist youth, which assumed an increasingly new tone, and the older traditionalists. Romero was forced to take sides when the huguistas tried to expel his old friend Zamanillo from the party. He sided with his fellow Cantabrian and confronted the virulent anti-Zamanillo pamphlet by Melchor Ferrer, but failed to prevent expulsion of the former. He also nurtured increasing doubts about what he viewed as the clumsy huguista tactics versus Franco; in 1964 he complained that it produced loss of some opportunities and previous gains. At one point he was even leaning towards the breakaway RENACE faction, but eventually Romero opted for full loyalty to his king.

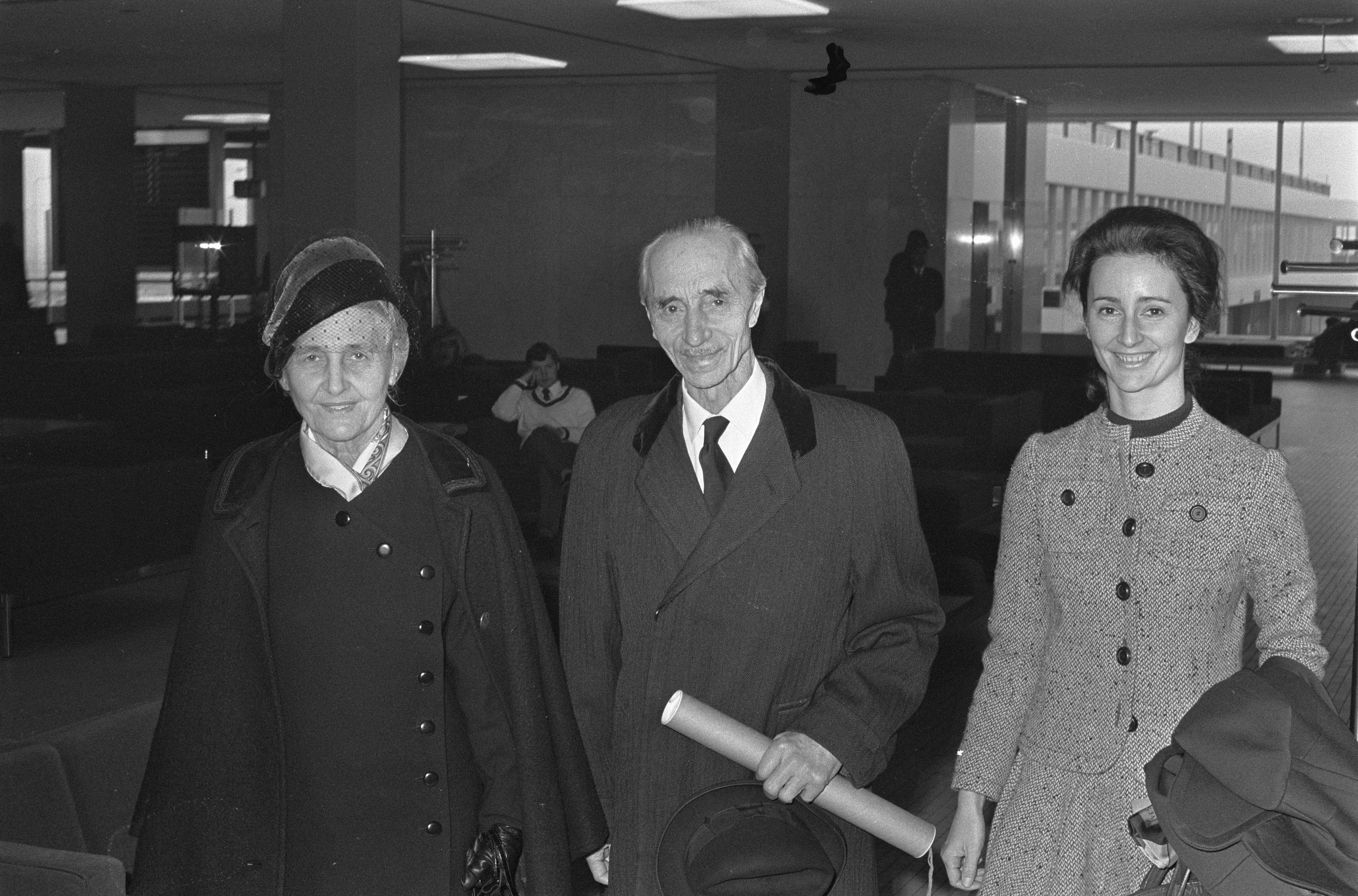
Don Javier and his wife, 1970

In the late 1960s Romero was already one of very few Traditionalist personalities in top Carlist strata; most have either withdrawn or had been already marginalized. He kept publishing traditional, historiographic articles in increasingly progressist party periodicals and even figured in editorial board of Esfuerzo común, a doctrinal organ of the progressists. One source claims he was one of the speakers during the 1967 Montejurra rally, though other sources claim otherwise. At the 1968 Montejurra amassment Romero acted as sort of mediator between two factions, as traditionally-minded Santanderinos tried to assault the progressists with batons and bats. In the early 1970s he kept standing by the dynasty, even though he received repeated warnings about its “carlismo-leninismo”. Romero viewed the Zamanillo-led attempt to build an alternative requeté combatant organisation, code-named Operación Maestrazgo, as sort of treason. His last book El prisionero de Dachau (1972) was a homage to Don Javier personally and to his family.

== Reception and legacy ==
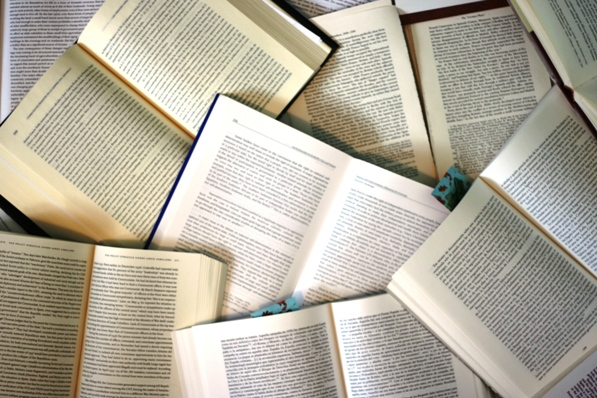

Before the war Romero's poetry was acknowledged only in his native Cantabria; reviewers praised his “elegant style”, “simple and delicate” language and “la formula peca de sencilla y de breve”, at times concluding that “the spirit of our poetry is not lost”. Some saw the Carlist turn as sort of Valle-Inclan's melancholic fascination, but the sincere one. Initially categorized as classicist in tone, in the mid-1930s his poetry was rather described as “agradable cocktail de poesía entre clásica y moderna”. Romero was approached as “delicadísimo poeta” and “romántico siglo XX”, though some complained about shortages in originality, colloquialisms and historiographic misrepresentations.

During Francoism his prosaic works were barely noted nationwide, but reviewers remained rather sympathetic. In case of novels they praised “ease of narration” which maintains “velocidad y ligereza de torrente” though noted some simplistic psychological construction of the protagonists. In case of essays they underlined “estilo suelto, agilidad de espiritú, cultura poco común” and “prosa sencilla y fluida”. Romero was held in particularly high regard among the monarchist audience, which hailed his “Traditionalist soul” and spirit. However, there were exceptions: Roman Oyarzún destroyed his Boinas Rojas en Austria as the piece which referred the tragic episode in “unforgivable light tone” and presented invented fiction as facts.

In the early 1960s Romero started to appear as sort of Cantabrian literary authority, especially in journalism, and received first local homages; they were even more pronounced by the end of the decade. His single poems appeared in centrally printed anthologies and he was noted in some general works on history of Spanish poetry. During late Francoism he earned his place in literary vademecums, though some noted him as “periodista, poeta” and some declared him rather the author of “los mejores novelas contemporáneas”. His death was noted in local Cantabrian press.

Romero's production have not outlived their author and currently he is missing even in footnotes of works on history of Spanish literature. His most frequently referred piece, La promesa del tulipán, is usually presented as typical hopelessly stereotypical work of early Francoism, burdened with nagging moralizing objectives and Manichean perspective; it is relegated to “novela rosa” or “novela para muchachos” rubric. Historians of literature are somewhat less damning when assessing Romero's poetry, valued above his prosaic production. Though some stigmatize him as “chiefly a religious poet”, some note his “línea prudente y antimoderna con el gusto literario petrificado en la residualidad epigonal del 98” and others place him within a wave of young Cantabria-related poets like María Teresa de Huidobro, Alejandro Nieto and Bernardo Casanueva Mazo. In 2007 Romero's poem made it even to a local Cantabrian poetic anthology. Rarely he is mentioned in accounts on history of Spanish republican press or lined-up in a sequence of Carlist writers.

== See also ==
- Carlism
- Carlism in literature
- Traditionalism (Spain)
