= Montejurra (magazine) =

Spanish magazine

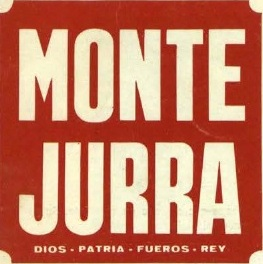
Montejurra late logotype

Montejurra was a Spanish monthly magazine, published between 1960 and 1971. Based in Pamplona it was distributed mostly in Navarre and Northern Spain, though pre-paid copies sent by mail reached recipients in the entire country. Its circulation is not clear; at one point the editors hoped to have 20,000 subscribers. The monthly was formatted as a political magazine and evolved from a 4-page text-only bulletin to a 44-page partially color illustrated review; altogether there were 106 issues published. Politically Montejurra was clearly identified as a Carlist periodical. Its launch was related to Carlism adopting a conciliatory position towards Francoism; following first ambiguous and then increasingly critical stand, since the mid-1960s the monthly suffered from censorship interventions, eventually to be forcibly closed by administration. Montejurra's editorial board was dominated by members of the Progressist faction and the monthly proved vital in their bid for control of the movement; its dominant thread was promotion of the Borbón-Parma dynasty, and especially prince Carlos Hugo.

== General background ==
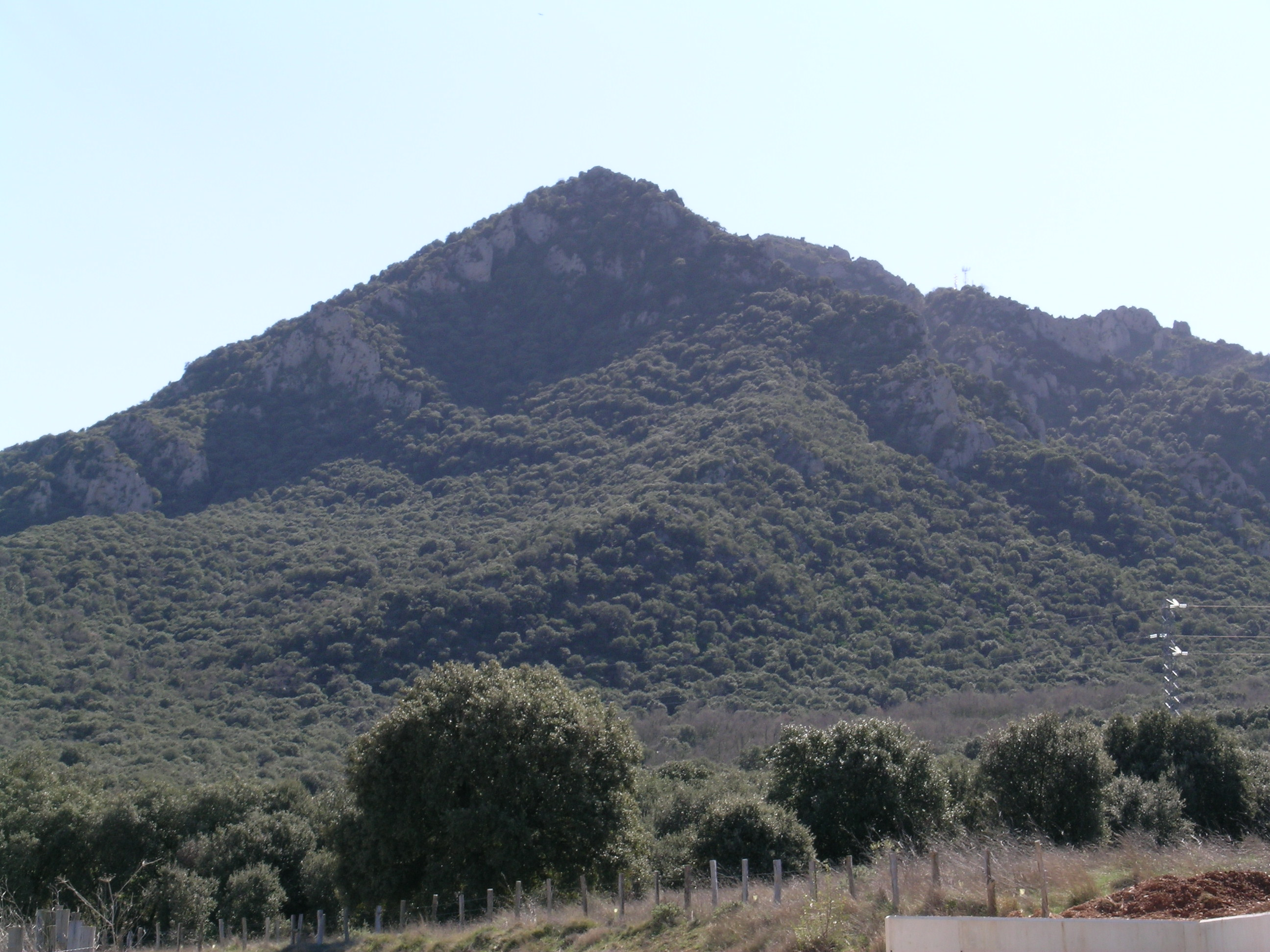
Montejurra (mountain)

Montejurra was set up as a private monthly, though it is not clear whether its owner, Eugenio Arraiza Vilella, from the onset acted as a front-man for semi-legal Carlist structures; at later stages ownership was transferred to a dedicated company. Initially the periodical operated with rather vague authorization on part of the administration, later it was granted a formal license from the censorship office. Having assumed professional and technologically advanced shape, since the mid-1960s Montejurra entered regular distribution channels. Its commercial performance is not clear; the monthly most likely operated at the verge of profitability. Management was composed of local Pamplona journalists; most among some 200 authors recorded provided few contributions, yet some of them stand out for their systematic writings. The title "Montejurra" referred to a mountain near the Navarrese city of Estella, site of battles during the 19th-century Carlist wars and since then an icon forming part of the Carlist mythical imagery.

=== Ownership ===
Some scholars claim that the predecessor of Montejurra was a bulletin El Fuerista, issued in Pamplona in the late 1950s, though there are no details provided. The periodical was founded in 1960 by the captain of Engineers Tomás Martorell Rosáenz and, after its success, in 1964 it began a new stage under the direction of the well-known Navarrese architect and earlier member of the Pamplona city council Eugenio Arraiza Vilella; in his youth an active Carlist and later a Carlist put up with Francoist Spain, he was wealthy enough to provide initial financing and prestigious enough to act as a front-man. It is not clear to what degree the initiative was co-ordinated with the party leadership or co-financed by Carlist structures; the very first issues contained a sub-title "Boletín de la Juventud Carlista de Navarra", dropped already in 1961. Until November 1964, the magazine remained under the control of the group led by Tomás Martorell; as late as in mid-1963 Arraiza suggested to the then Carlist political leader José María Valiente that a parent company to publish the review be set up as sociedad anónima. The proposal was accepted and such a company has materialized; neither its name nor ownership structure is clear, though it is known that in 1964 Comunión Tradicionalista launched a subscription scheme for shares of the company. It is known that the Arraiza family retained a key position; following the 1968 death of Arraiza Vilella it was his sons, José Fermín and Juan Pedro Arraiza Rodríguez-Monte, who took over. Both sympathetic to the Progressist faction within Carlism they ensured that the competing Traditionalists have never managed to gain control of Montejurra, as it happened in 1970 with the Pamplona Carlist daily El Pensamiento Navarro.

=== Format ===
Because of changing format of the review the lifetime of Montejurra might be divided into 3 phases. The first one lasted from 1960 to mid-1963, when the monthly resembled initially simple and then increasingly ambitious bulletin. Published on 35x25 cm sheets, the issues contained almost none to few photographs or pictures of rather poor quality, with text layout usually in two columns and the number of pages growing from 4 to 12. The second phase lasted from mid-1963 to late 1964, when Montejurra became more of a review. The sheet size was broadened to 42x32 cm, covers contained a full front-page photo, layout became more dynamic, red color was introduced in headings and graphics and photographs started to be omnipresent; the number of pages was ranging from 8 to 14. The third phase lasted from late 1964 until 1971, when Montejurra assumed shape of a professional magazine, perhaps resemblant of a weekly rather than a monthly. It was re-sized to the original 32x25 cm, full color was introduced to cover and some inside photos, and text was structured in as many as 4 columns; layout gained even more dynamics, with boxes, in-text graphics and introduction of new fonts. Issues usually exceeded 28 pages, at times reaching as many as 44. Another scholar prefers to single out 4 phases: 1) bulletin (1960-1963), 2) broadsheet (1963-1964), 3) review (1964-1968) and 4) vanguard review (1968-1971).

=== Licenses ===
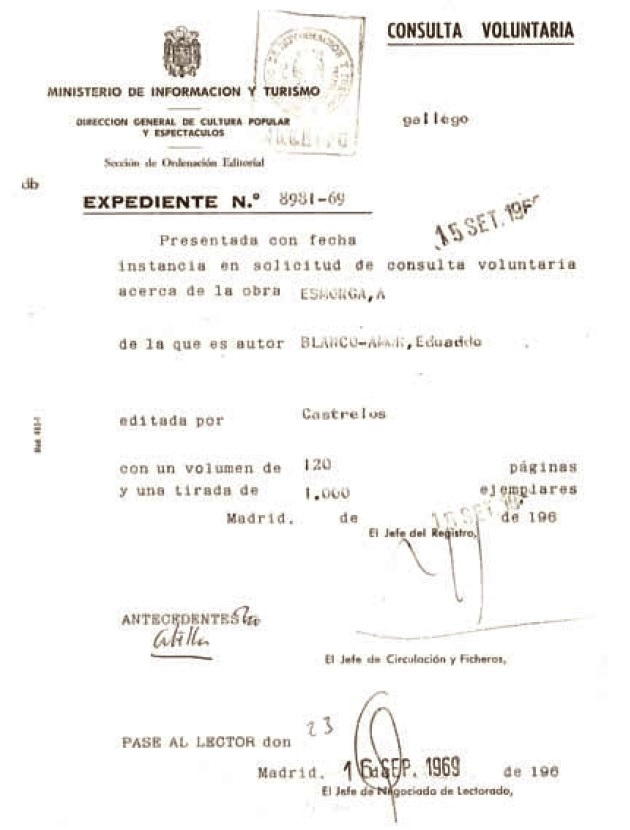
censorship certificate

When launched in 1960 Montejurra was granted no official license. As the review was to be based in Pamplona, formally its appearance on the market was made possible by verbal permission from civil governor of Navarre, a decision no doubt consulted earlier with appropriate central authorities in Madrid. This somewhat shaky official standing was changed probably when the review was taken over by a sociedad-anonima-type company in 1963. At that time the company was granted Depósito Legal, an official registration number; it enabled printing contracts with professional companies, in case of Montejurra with the Pamplona-based Gráficas Navarra. One more step on the path to full institutionalization of the review was formal license issued by Ministry of Tourism and Information, the unit running the censorship office. At this point Montejurra changed numbering of its sequential issues, also because it was to be transformed from a monthly to a weekly; in November 1964 instead of issue nr 47 the subsequent one was numbered as the first one. The plan failed and in early 1965 Montejurra soon returned to a monthly format, yet official censorship license allowed standard commercial distribution. Following a series of consorship-imposed fines and interventions, the ministry withdrew the license in April 1971, which forced closure of the monthly.

=== Commercial performance ===
None of the sources consulted provides any information on financial standing of Montejurra, its commercial performance or business-related issues in general; hence, all opinions are based on speculations. It is evident that upon launch the monthly was primarily a political, not a commercial venture, and its primary objective was about mobilizing support for Carlism, not to generate profit. It is known that initially the Arraiza family provided either all or most of the funding, yet it is not clear whether during first years of operation Montejurra was getting such a heavy financial burden that the family suggested ownership transfer to a sociedad anonima company. Nevertheless, in the mid-1960s the monthly might have seemed fairly successful; its technical standard improved dramatically, issues contained more and more pages and the distribution network widened. Overall circulation of Montejurra was 5,000 copies in 1960 and 10,000 in the early 1960s, with extraordinary issues selling up to 25,000 copies; at one point the review targeted 20,000 subscribers, in Spanish market conditions of the time a rather satisfactory result for a specialized political monthly. In the mid-1960s Montejurra started to run adverts, usually of companies based in Navarre and Vascongadas, e.g. banks or retailers. It is unclear whether Montejurra produced any profit, yet is clear that it was not financial problems which forced closure of the review.

=== Management ===
While it seems clear that the Arraiza family remained key owners of Montejurra it is not known who initially was actually steering the monthly, be it as editor-in-chief or as a business manager. Until 1966 none of the issues named a director, editor or redactor jefe; editorials were unsigned and emphasis seemed to be on collective work. Historiographic works on Carlism of the early 1960s usually single out Ramón Massó Tarruella and Pedro J. Zabala Sevilla as key engineers of the propaganda campaign mounted by the Progressist faction of Carlism, yet it is not known whether resident in Madrid, they were in position to steer the Pamplona-based monthly. The first individual singled out as "director" in 1966 was Juan Indave Nuin, a 35-year-old engaged earlier in various Carlist radio and press initiatives. Later in 1966 he was replaced by María Blanca Ferrer García, also in her mid-30s and apart from engagement in various Navarrese press titles also a poet; she held the job until the early 1970. At this point Victorino del Pozo Barbero became her temporary replacement, while the last Montejurra director was Fermina Gil González; no detail is known about her. It is noted that Montejurra twice experienced major staff turnover: in 1964, probably related to marginalisation of Massó, and in 1968, when a few graduates from the Pamplona Instituto de Periodismo of Universidad de Navarra joined; they were led by Fernando García Romanillos. Since early 1968 until the last issue José Maria Echarri Loidi was listed as "administrator".

=== Major contributors ===
key contributors
no	name	#	period
1	Jose Carlos Clemente	40	1965-71
2	Raimundo de Miguel	36	1965-71
3	Pedro J. Zabala	30	1961-71
4	Antonio M. Solís-García	20	1962-68
5	Evaristo Olcina Jiménez	18	1967-71
6	Francisco López Sanz	16	1965-68
6	Ignacio Romero Raizábal	16	1962-68
8	Antonio Segura Ferns	13	1963-69
9	Ramón Rodon Guinjoán	11	1967-70
9	Inocencio Zalba Elizalde	11	1966-68

There are almost 200 names appearing as contributors, though some might be pen-names of the same individuals; about 150 authors contributed no more than 3 pieces and about 10 signed at least 10 articles. There are two authors who stand out: Raimundo de Miguel and Pedro J. Zabala. Both contributed above 30 pieces, mostly major articles tackling key political issues, and both started to publish in Montejurra in the mid-1960s. Their prominence demonstrates also coexistence of two political visions: de Miguel was a Traditionalist, Zabala emerged as key theorist of Progressism. Also other major contributors can be classified accordingly. The former group included Francisco López Sanz, Ignacio Romero Raizábal, Antonio Segura Ferns, Inocencio Zalba Elizalde, Antonio Maria Solís García and Ramón Rodon Guinjoan, except the last one all members of older generations who lived through the Civil War; they either died before prince Carlos Hugo sealed Progressist domination by setting up Partido Carlista or refused to join it. On the other hand, there were Jose Carlos Clemente and Evaristo Olcina Jiménez, at that time young men who matured during early Francoism; together with Zabala they proved instrumental in building theoretical foundation for the socialist platform championed by prince Carlos Hugo.

== Key threads ==
Having passed its teething phase and upon reaching a more matured format the issues of Montejurra offered a diversified content. There were fixed components: editorial, letters from the readers and periodically various columns and rubrics dedicated to history, literature, social issues or other topics, usually penned by the same authors – e.g. Clemente run the Página literaria section. Though Montejurra was directed at the young audience, somewhat lightweight sections on fashion or sports appeared very briefly and were eventually abandoned. Few pages were usually acknowledging recent events within the movement, though popular gatherings and Borbón-Parma activities were clearly preferred to closed meetings of party leaders. One act attracted particular attention: the Carlist gathering in Montejurra was invariably discussed extensively in one or two spring issues, at later stages with major photo coverage. The remaining space was split between smaller feullieton-like contributions, mid-size essays, interviews and larger theoretical pieces. The focus was clearly on Spain and its internal issues, though especially at later stages some attention was dedicated to international politics. In general, Montejurra remained a rather hybrid periodical, with elements from different ends of media spectrum combined; they ranged from sophisticated theoretical political monthly, to cultural or religious journal, illustrated news magazine, militant fanzine down to people or even celebrity review.

=== Borbón-Parmas ===
The single thread which clearly dominated throughout the entire Montejurra lifetime and which dwarfs all other subjects was exaltation of the Borbón-Parma family, with veiled perspective of prince Carlos Hugo assuming the Spanish throne constantly in the background. Every single issue contained omnipresent references to family members; as the monthly assumed more technologically advanced format, photographs of the Borbón-Parmas were increasingly dotting the pages. At times it might have appeared that Montejurra was some sort of a Borbón-Parma family bulletin. From 1960 to 1971 members of the family 673 times appeared on photos, on average 6 times per issue. Not all of them received equal treatment: prince Carlos Hugo remained on the forefront with 220 photos, his wife Irene earned 194 pictures, his sisters featured 152 times, his father and the Carlist king Don Javier was photographed 67 times and his mother 40 times; in comparison, the Carlist political leader José María Valiente was pictured 22 times. Montejurra editors seemed perfectly aware of the consumer society features. Apart from notes from official events like lectures, visits or sermons they formatted the thread as a series of media scoops, e.g. the prince as a miner, parachuter or running with the bulls during the Sanfermines; at times Montejurra resembled a glamour magazine, with extensive stories from aristocratic feasts or leisure events, be it the Borbón-Parmas in ski resorts on during yachting ventures. Massive coverage of Carlos Hugo's wife and sisters, all in their 20s, demonstrates that Montejurra editors were conscious that photos of young females rendered the content more attractive to many readers.

=== Francoism ===
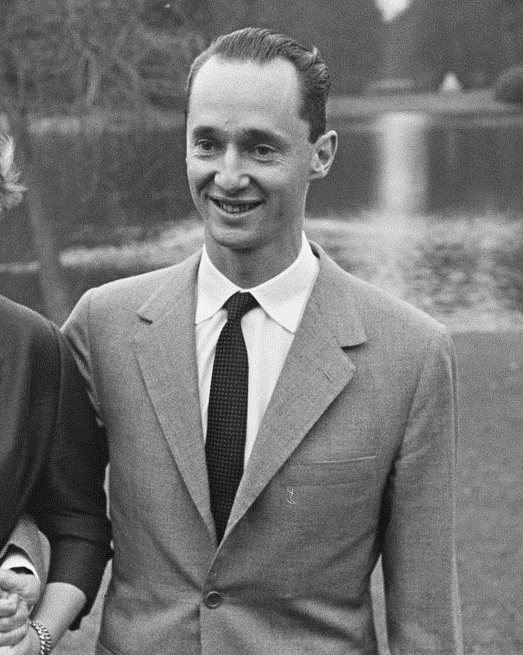
prince Carlos Hugo

Until the mid-1950s Carlism remained in opposition to the regime, its veiled institutional outposts barely tolerated by the administration. In 1955-1957 this strategy was replaced with cautious cooperation. Prince Carlos Hugo joined the new platform and his public statements sounded like an offer to Franco, with dynastic hopes vaguely in the background. The rapprochement produced some visible concessions on part of the regime, and green light for a few Carlist periodicals was one of them. Until the mid-1960s Montejurra pursued a careful tactics. The monthly underlined the official auto-definition of the system as a representative and social monarchy and tried to stress the royal threads as much as possible. On the other hand, while loyal to Franco the monthly preferred to avoid exaltation of caudillo, to de-emphasize Falangism and to mark its distance to autocratic features. The censorship office remained suspicious and imposed a number of restrictions, aimed at preventing dynastic propaganda. When in the mid-1960s it became clear that Carlos Hugo was losing the race for Franco's favors to Juan Carlos, Montejurra became increasingly adamant; this in turn produced problems in censorship, and the second half of the decade was marked by escalating tension. Following the 1968 expulsion of Carlos Hugo Montejurra became openly critical of the regime; though "Cruzada" was exalted as late as 1969, tension grew into a war. Turn of the decade brought constant administrative interventions and fines, which climaxed in eventual withdrawal of the license.

=== Social threads ===
From the very onset Montejurra devoted attention to social issues like minimum salary, a thread barely characteristic for Carlism so far; particular focus was on the rural milieu and some authors advocated even "expropriación forzosa de los latifundios". In isolated but systematically re-appearing articles the review lambasted greedy capitalism yet ridiculed also "aberración del comunismo y socialismo". Both Marxism and capitalism were denounced as two forms of exploitation of the working people, though when Ya claimed that Montejurra was looking for "a Third Spain", the editors objected. However, indeed also later the monthly seemed equidistant towards capitalist and communist models, publishing articles which denounced both penetration of US capital in Spain of the late 1960s and breakdown of steered economy in Poland of 1970. Its social militancy was getting more and more visible. Questions of agrarian reform, discussed mostly by Zabala and Olcina, earned a dedicated rubric and appeared regularly; these theoretical schemes were increasingly boasting of social justice, the working people, their rights and defense against exploitation. New Carlist workers’ organizations, like MOT, were dedicated more and more attention. However, until 1971 Montejurra has never advocated a particular model and did not embrace the term "socialismo"; instead, it opted for "sociedalismo".

=== Political regime ===
Montejurra was clearly a monarchist monthly and within limits permitted by the Francoist censorship it constantly exploited officially adopted auto-definition of Spain as "monarquía", invariably in relation to the Borbón-Parma dynasty. Other features of the existing regime were getting de-emphasized, though not challenged. From time to time the monthly applauded organic democracy, a model of representation adopted during Francoism, as opposed to "parlamentarismo inoperante" of other Western European states. However, the approach was changing over time, as evidenced by usage of the term "democracy". Until 1964 it appeared seldom, on average 4 times per issue, and usually against suspicious or openly hostile background, e.g. as "so-called democracy"; Zabala dubbed democracy – along totalitarianism – a natural child of liberal demagogy and Don Juan, who took part in the Munich opposition congress of 1962, was lambasted as compromised by his democratic companions. In 1965-1968 democracy was referred to 12-15 times in every issue, during this phase in increasingly ambiguous usage. Finally, since 1969 "democracy" became a dominating theme featuring 23-25 times per issue, already clearly as an objective pursued; if qualified, it appeared no longer as "orgánica" but rather as "carlista", "autárquica", "nueva", "social", "directa", "del pueblo" and similar. The democratic vision pursued has never been clearly specified, though it appeared to be distinct from all existing models, also these of Western Europe, as demonstrated by professed "antipartidismo" of Carlism.

=== Religion ===
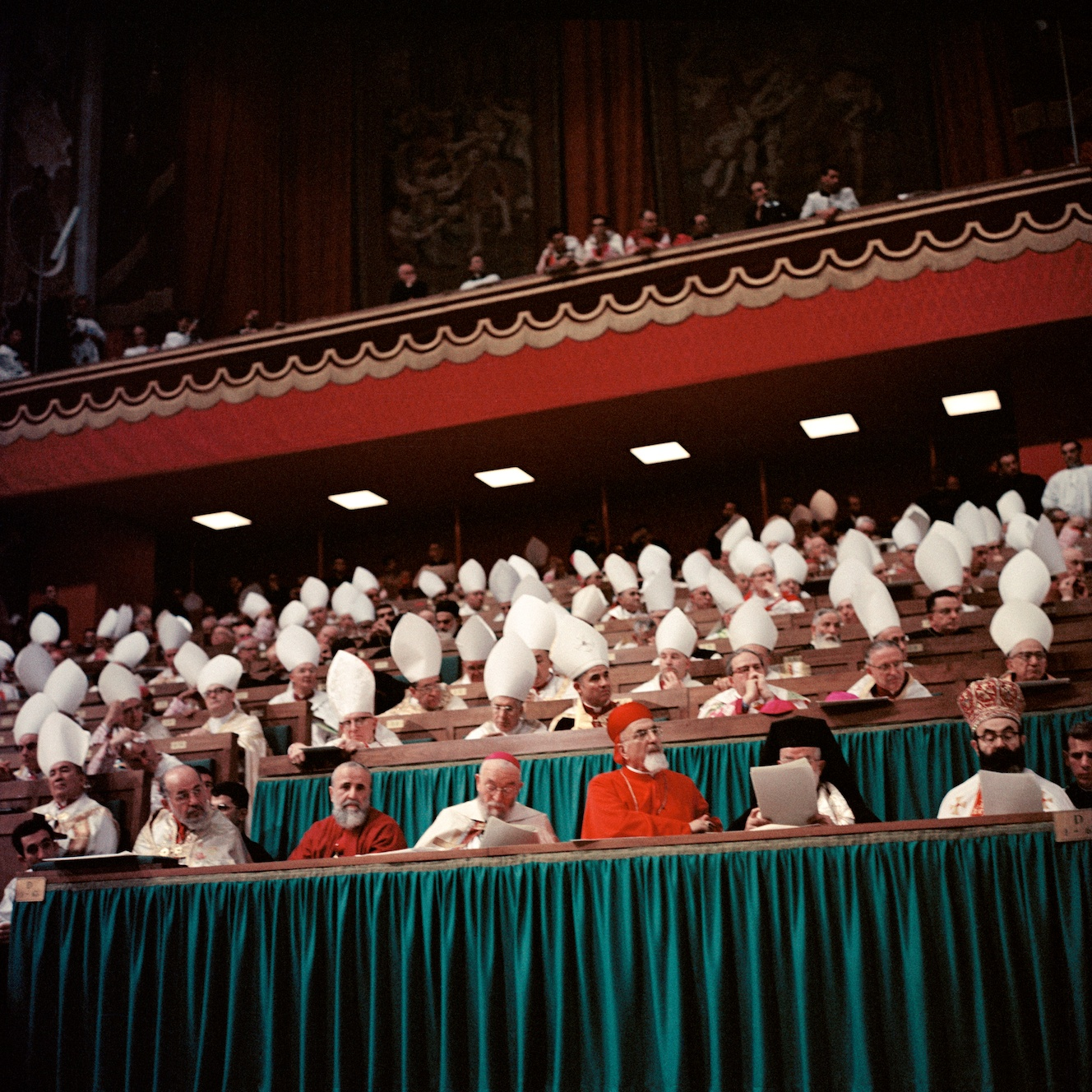
Vaticanum II at work

As key component of the Carlist outlook religion was one of major threads appearing in Montejurra, invariably presented as Roman Catholic orthodoxy; most issues contained information on religious feasts attended by the Carlists, interviews with hierarchs, photographs related and theoretical essays. However, in course of the decade religion became a challenge. In the early 1960s Montejurra advanced a traditionalist version of Christianity, integral component of Alzamiento Nacional and basis of peace and justice ruling in Spain after 1939; various authors remained skeptical of foreign challenges to "our spiritual patrimony", e.g. posed by foreign tourism, and there were even anti-masonic threads appearing. Christian Democracy, especially the Italian way, became a preferred bad boy, constantly and repeatedly charged with distortion of Catholic thought and working for the benefit of Moscow. Vaticanum II brought bewilderment. Initially ironic notes about ecumenism gradually gave way to open and vehement campaign against religious liberty, yet later on Montejurra settled for traditional Carlist doctrine "not a step back and not a step ahead of the Church". In practical terms it amounted to tacit endorsement of the new outlook; in 1969 the key theoretical pundit of Montejurra, Zabala, claimed openly that "religious liberty is the first fundamental right of a man". However, even in the very late 1960s authors like Alvaro d’Ors published articles advancing a traditionalist vision.

=== History ===
Almost every issue of Montejurra contained one or few pieces dwelling on the Carlist past; the author who specialized in the topic was Romero Raizabal. Some 130 years of Carlist history provided a vast assortment of episodes to choose from and their treatment in Montejurra did not differ significantly from the usual Carlist approach, with exaltation of patriotic virtues, sacrifice, determination and loyalty. The period featured regularly was the last Civil War, which earned a rubric titled Estampas de la Cruzada; however, also the Third and the First Carlist War received extensive treatment, Carlist kings and leaders presented as icons of Spanish history. Historical threads in Montejurra were published with contemporary objectives in mind, though it is not clear whether authors like Romero Raizabal were conscious of this long-term strategy. References to glorious past served as means of sustaining mobilization among the rank and file. They were also supposed to provide sound Carlist credentials to the monthly which was increasingly advancing a new agenda and whose leaders were at times criticized for deviating from the party orthodoxy. Unwavering loyalty to Carlist kings, constantly underlined as a key virtue, remained instrumental in consolidating the ranks behind the Borbón-Parmas; fidelity to the legitimate dynasty played major role in the Progressist strategy of taking control of the movement. Finally, theoretical essays on Carlist history were calibrated to emphasize threads useful in advancing own ideological agenda and presented Carlism as a movement of social protest.

=== Polemics ===
As already in the very early 1960s Montejurra was advancing concepts, threads and rhetoric which raised many eyebrows, the monthly became subject to suspicion among the Carlist pundits. In 1963 some Traditionalist intellectuals grouped around a review Siempre openly raised alarm, presenting the monthly as a vehicle of Huguistas in their bid for power in the movement. Though Montejurra avoided open confrontation with the Traditionalists this time the editorial board stroke back; characteristically, the monthly posed as representative of orthodoxy against heterodoxes, not the other way round, and used loyalty to the claimant as a yardstick gauging fidelity to the doctrine. The general strategy of toning down controversies was used also later on and rather than to bank on secessions and defections in the party, Montejurra tended to ignore them. Expulsion of the chief enemy of Progressists, Zamanillo, was passed over in silence, and Zamanillo was mentioned as if nothing had happened as late as in 1964. The Traditionalists, already convinced that the monthly was controlled by subversive left-wing dissidents, attempted to mount a counter-offensive; during a massive 1966 Carlist congress their formal proposal was that "the Montejurra review is to be considered Carlist, but not a doctrinal authority for Comunión Tradicionalista". The bid failed, yet also later Montejurra did not openly challenge or lambaste the Traditionalists; articles of their top intellectuals like Rafael Gambra were printed in Montejurra as late as in 1968, and until the very late 1960s Montejurra might have seemed "a mosaic" of not necessarily compatible outlooks.

== Impact ==
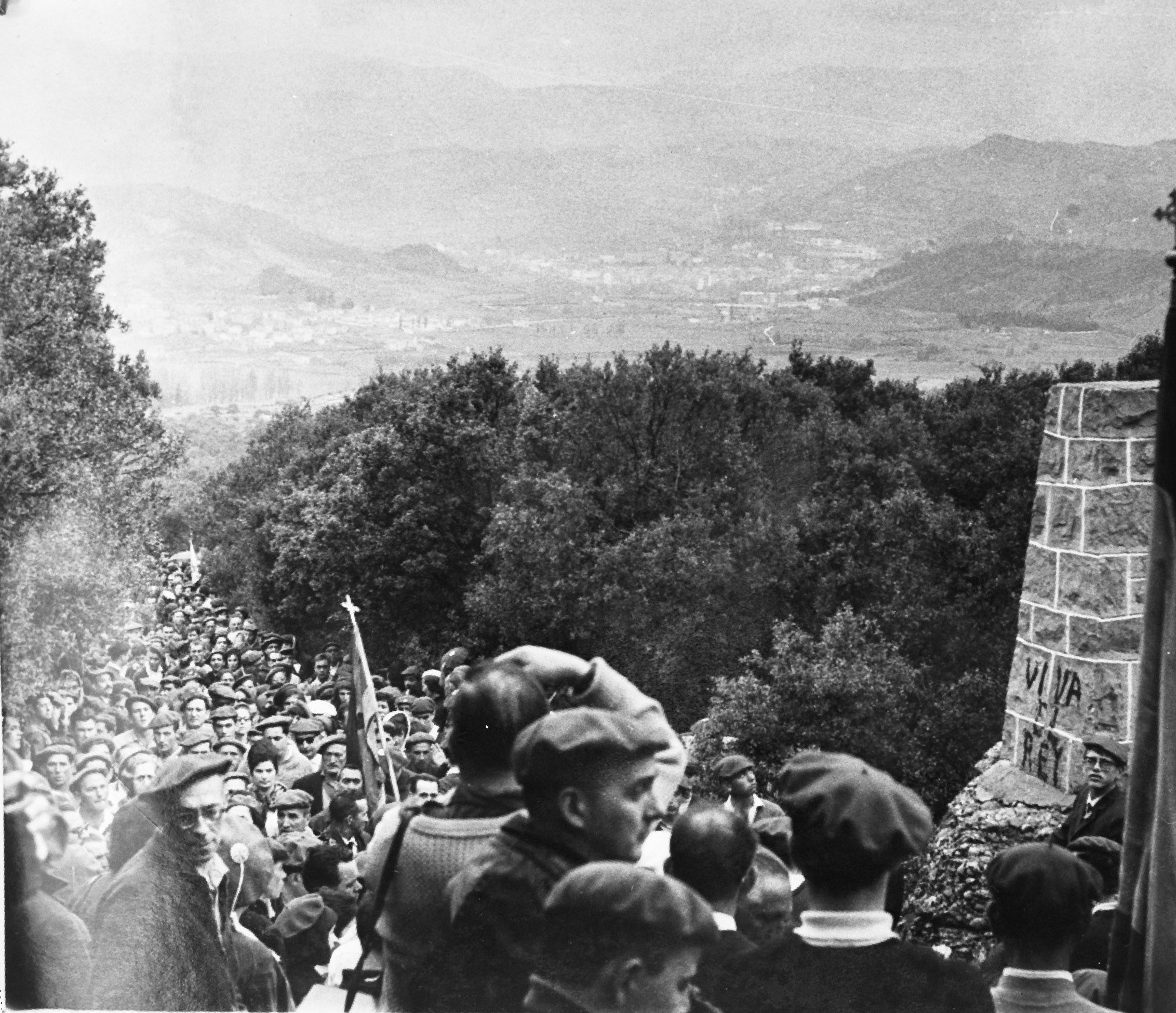
Montejurra gathering, 1973

Montejurra made little if any impact on the Spanish market in general; it was nowhere near the role of a major discussion platform, performed by monthly reviews like Cuadernos para el Diálogo or El Ciervo. However, it was vital for Carlism of the 1960s. Fairly popular among the young and mid-age generation of party militants, together with other periodicals set up at the turn of the 1950s and 1960s - like La Encina, Información Mensual, Azada y Asta and Esfuerzo Común – it served as key information channel within the movement. Some scholars claim that Montejurra was the most important Carlist publication since the civil war; the claim can hardly be verified, yet it remains clear that no party publication could have compared to Montejurra in terms of popularity, the success resulting from its format of professionally edited, colored illustrated magazine. Other scholars remain more cautious and though they consider the monthly indeed vital for the Carlists, they note that it did not set the tone but merely followed political direction marked by other party periodicals, especially Información Mensual.

It is generally agreed that Montejurra contributed to major transformation of Carlism of the era. The monthly helped to educate a generation of young militants who understood Carlism as a socialist movement of protest; it proved instrumental for the Progressist takeover of the movement and gradual marginalisation of the Traditionalists. However, it is not clear whether Montejurra was from the very onset a platform controlled by supporters of prince Carlos Hugo or whether it was rather a platform of first coexistence and then competition between the Traditionalists and the Progressists, with the latter taking the upper hand around 1968. In the former case selected orthodox threads would have been a camouflage and a lever enabling later a left-wing turn. In the latter case orthodox threads would have been present due to initially highly heterogeneous and balanced composition of the editorial board. It is not clear whether Traditionalist authors like de Miguel, López Sanz or Romero Raizabal were manipulated by the Progressists pulling the strings, like Massó, Zabala or Clemente, or whether presence of two groups in Montejurra demonstrated the old gradually giving way to the new in Carlism of the 1960s.

== See also ==
- Carlism
- Traditionalism (Spain)
