= Tejera =

Tejera (Spanish pronunciation: [teˈxeɾa]) is a Spanish-language surname, meaning place of yew trees.

It may refer to:

- Carolina Tejera (born 1976), Venezuelan model and actress
- Domingo Tejera de Quesada (1881-1944), Spanish publisher
- Domingo Tejera (1899–1969), Uruguayan footballer who played as a defender
- Enrique Tejera (1889–1980), Venezuelan physician
- Enrique Tejera Paris (1919–2015), Venezuelan lawyer, diplomat and politician
- Eusebio Tejera (1922–2002), Uruguayan footballer who played as a defender
- Federico J. González Tejera (born 1964), the president and CEO of Radisson Hospitality AB
- Gustavo Tejera (born 1988), Uruguayan football referee
- Humberto Tejera (1890–1971), Venezuelan lawyer and writer
- Juan Tejera (born 1983), Uruguayan footballer who plays as a centre-back or defensive midfielder
- Marcelo Tejera (born 1973), former Uruguayan footballer who played as an attacking midfielder
- María Josefina Tejera (1931–2021), Venezuelan phylologist
- Martín Tejera (born 1991), Uruguayan footballer who plays as a goalkeeper
- Michael Tejera (born 1976), former Cuban Major League Baseball pitcher
- Nivaria Tejera (1929–2016), Cuban poet and novelist
- Sergio Tejera (born 1990), Spanish footballer who plays as a central midfielder
- Victorino Tejera Márquez (1922-2018), Spanish scholar and professor of philosophy
- Diego de la Tejera Farías (born 1995), Mexican football midfielder

== See also ==
- Teixeira, the Portuguese-language version
- Tejada (disambiguation)
- Tejeda (disambiguation)
