= Texeira =

Texeira is a variant spelling of a common Portuguese surname Teixeira. Notable people with the surname include:

- Mark Texeira, American comic book artist
- Manuel Texeira, priest
- Kanekoa Texeira, American baseball pitcher
- David Texeira, Uruguayan footballer
- See also Teixeira and Teixeira (disambiguation)
