= List of shipwrecks in January 1821 =

The list of shipwrecks in January 1821 includes ships sunk, wrecked or otherwise lost during January 1821.

== 1 January ==
List of shipwrecks: 1 January 1821
Ship	State	Description
Henry	United Kingdom	The ship was abandoned in the Atlantic Ocean with the ultimate loss of ten of her fourteen crew. Survivors were rescued by Endeavour (United Kingdom). Henry was on a voyage from Saint John, New Brunswick, British North America to Dublin.
Rolla	United States	The ship was driven ashore and wrecked at Eastham, Massachusetts with the loss of eight lives. She was on a voyage from Guadeloupe and St. Thomas, Virgin Island to New York.

== 2 January ==
List of shipwrecks: 2 January 1821
Ship	State	Description
Anna Maria	Netherlands	The ship departed from Havana, Cuba for Amsterdam, North Holland. No further trace, presumed foundered with the loss of all hands.
Ferdinand	Stettin	The ship was driven ashore and wrecked on the coast of Lincolnshire, United Kingdom. She was on a voyage from Stettin to Bordeaux, Gironde France.
Gothenburg	Sweden	The ship was driven ashore and wrecked on the coast of Lincolnshire. She was on a voyage from Gothenburg to Cádiz, Spain.
Marmion	United Kingdom	The ship ran aground on the Hindebank. She was later refloated and beached on Goree, Zeeland, Netherlands.
Ontario	United States	The ship was wrecked on a reef off Timor, Netherlands East Indies. She was on a voyage from New York to Canton, China.

== 3 January ==
List of shipwrecks: 3 January 1821
Ship	State	Description
Bounty	United Kingdom	The ship was driven ashore in Lough Swilly.
John & Sarah	United Kingdom	The ship was abandoned whilst on a voyage from Riga, Russia to Hull, Yorkshire.

== 4 January ==
List of shipwrecks: 4 January 1821
Ship	State	Description
Dorah	United Kingdom	The ship was driven ashore and wrecked in Table Bay.
Emma	United Kingdom	The ship was driven ashore and wrecked in Table Bay.
Fame	United Kingdom	The ship was driven ashore at Bélem, Portugal. She was later refloated.
Indian Packet	Denmark	The ship was driven ashore and wrecked at Table Bay.
Rebecca	United Kingdom	The ship was wrecked at Cromore Point, County Kerry. Her crew were rescued. She was on a voyage from Galway to Dublin.

== 5 January ==
List of shipwrecks: 5 January 1821
Ship	State	Description
Actress	United States	The ship was driven ashore and severely damaged at Gibraltar. She was later refloated.
Adeline	United States	The brig was driven ashore at Gibraltar. She was later refloated.
Anna Louisa	United States	The brig was driven ashore and wrecked at Cádiz, Spain.
Conceicão	Spain	The ship was driven ashore at Gibraltar. She was later refloated.
Fortuna	United Kingdom	The ship was driven ashore and severely damaged at Cádiz.
Hero	(United Kingdom of Great Britain and Ireland) Gibraltar	The sloop was driven ashore at Gibraltar. She was later refloated.
Hope	United Kingdom	The ship ran aground and sank at Carlingford, County Louth. She was on a voyage from Quebec City, Lower Canada, British North America to Liverpool, Lancashire.
Jane & Mary	United Kingdom	The ship departed from Halifax, Nova Scotia, British North America for Madeira, Portugal. No further trace, presumed foundered with the loss of all hands.
Olive	United Kingdom	The ship was wrecked near Fife Ness with the loss of two of her crew. She was on a voyage from Riga, Russia to Dundee, Forfarshire.
Superior	United Kingdom	The ship was driven ashore and wrecked at Gibraltar. Her crew were rescued. She was on a voyage from Saint Kitts to Malta.
William	United Kingdom	The sloop was driven ashore and wrecked at Chipiona, Spain. She was on a voyage from Exeter, Devon to Cádiz.

== 6 January ==
List of shipwrecks: 6 January 1821
Ship	State	Description
Ann and William	United Kingdom	The ship foundered in the Atlantic Ocean (41°07′N 17°58′W). Her crew were rescued by Union (United Kingdom). She was on a voyage from Plymouth, Devon to Terceira, Azores, Portugal.
Anna	United Kingdom	The ship was driven ashore at Newry, County Antrim. She was on a voyage from Greenock, Renfrewshire to Waterford.
Cora	United Kingdom	The ship was wrecked at Blyth, South Shetland Islands. Her crew were rescued.
Foyle	United Kingdom	The ship was driven ashore and wrecked at Ballycotton, County Cork. Her crew were rescued. She was on a voyage from Chepstow, Monmouthshire to Londonderry.
Friendship	United Kingdom	The ship ran aground at Carlingford, County Louth. She was on a voyage from Whitehaven, Cumberland to Dublin.

== 7 January ==
List of shipwrecks: 7 January 1821
Ship	State	Description
Ann	United Kingdom	The ship ran aground off Portaferry, County Down and was severely damaged. She was on a voyage from Liverpool, Lancashire to Belfast, County Antrim. Ann was later refloated and taken in to Portaferry.
Katherine	United Kingdom	The brig was driven ashore and wrecked at Nantucket, Massachusetts, United States. Her crew were rescued. She was on a voyage from Montego Bay, Jamaica to Bermuda.
Philo	United States	The ship capsized with the loss of all but two of her crew. She was on a voyage from Smyrna, Ottoman Empire to Boston, Massachusetts. She was later righted and taken in to Charleston, South Carolina, where she arrived in late March.
Sisters	United Kingdom	The ship was driven ashore and wrecked near Montrose, Forfarshire. Her crew were rescued. She was on a voyage from Riga, Russia to Hull, Yorkshire.
Swift Packet	United Kingdom	The ship caught fire in Belfast Bay and was scuttled. She was on a voyage from Bristol, Gloucestershire to Dumbarton.

== 8 January ==
List of shipwrecks: 8 January 1821
Ship	State	Description
Amiable Fanny	Kingdom of Sardinia	The ship was wrecked at Mogador, Morocco.
Delegate	United Kingdom	The ship was abandoned in the Atlantic Ocean (38°44′N 67°28′W). Her crew were rescued by Marchioness of Queensbury Packet (United Kingdom).

== 9 January ==
List of shipwrecks: 9 January 1821
Ship	State	Description
Birch	United Kingdom	The ship was lost off Jamaica. All on board were rescued. She was on a voyage from Liverpool, Lancashire to Jamaica.
Ebe	Austrian Empire	The ship foundered off Corfu, Greece. Her crew were rescued.
Ré	Austrian Empire	The brig was driven ashore and wrecked on the Istrian coast. Her crew were rescued.

== 11 January ==
List of shipwrecks: 11 January 1821
Ship	State	Description
Anna Margaretta	Kingdom of Hanover	The galliot was driven out to sea crewless from Porto, Portugal.
Fair Hibernian	United Kingdom	The ship capsized with the loss of three of her crew. She was subsequently driven ashore and wrecked at Vila do Conde, Portugal.
Matilda	United Kingdom	The ship was driven ashore and severely damaged at Porto. She was on a voyage from Porto to Dublin. Matilda was later refloated.
Minerva	United Kingdom	The ship was damaged in the Douro and was beached at Porto. She was later refloated.
Santa Antonio Vencedor	Spain	The coaster sank at Porto.
Senhora da Panta	Portugal	The yacht was wrecked at Porto.
Triumfo da Inveja	Portugal	The yacht was wrecked at Porto.

== 12 January ==
List of shipwrecks: 12 January 1821
Ship	State	Description
Ann and Susannah	United Kingdom	The ship was wrecked at The Needles, Isle of Wight. Her crew were rescued. She was on a voyage from Falmouth, Cornwall to Cowes, Isle of Wight.

== 13 January ==
List of shipwrecks: 13 January 1821
Ship	State	Description
Barrett	United Kingdom	The ship was abandoned in the Atlantic Ocean. Her crew were rescued by Ann (United Kingdom). Barrett was on a voyage from Saint John, New Brunswick, British North America to Liverpool, Lancashire.
Convention	Prussia	The ship was wrecked on "Hesselae", in the Kattegat. She was on a voyage from St Martin's to Pillau.

== 14 January ==
List of shipwrecks: 14 January 1821
Ship	State	Description
Anna Margaretta	Kingdom of Hanover	The schooner was driven ashore and wrecked at Azurara, Portugal.
Caledonia	United Kingdom	The ship departed from Newfoundland for Lisbon, Portugal. No further trace, presumed foundered in the Atlantic Ocean with the loss of all hands.
Fair Hibernian	United Kingdom	The brigantine was wrecked at Porto, Portugal with the loss of three or four of her crew.
Matilda	United Kingdom	The brigantine was wrecked at Sampayo, Portugal.
Providence	Sweden	The ship was wrecked at "St. Eulabe". Her crew were rescued. She was on a voyage from Cádiz, Spain to St. Sebastian's.
Thomas Durham	United Kingdom	The ship was driven ashore and wrecked in Mossel Bay with the loss of all hands.

== 15 January ==
List of shipwrecks: 15 January 1821
Ship	State	Description
Industry	United Kingdom	The ship was driven ashore and severely damaged at Buncrana, County Donegal. She was on a voyage from Sligo to Liverpool, Lancashire. Industry was subsequently refloated with assistance from HMRC Townsend ( Board of Customs).
Krone	Unknown	The ship sprang a leak and was abandoned in the Atlantic Ocean. Her crew were rescued by Neptune (United States). Krone was on a voyage from Havre de Grâce, Seine-Inférieure, France to Charleston, South Carolina, United States.
Providentia	France	The ship was wrecked near Dungeness, Kent, United Kingdom. Her crew were rescued. She was on a voyage from Le Croisic, Loire-Inférieure to Ostend, West Flanders, Netherlands.

== 16 January ==
List of shipwrecks: 16 January 1821
Ship	State	Description
Two Brothers	United Kingdom	The ship was wrecked at Cape Wrath, Sutherland. She was on a voyage from Belfast, County Antrim to Portmahomack, Ross-shire.

== 18 January ==
List of shipwrecks: 18 January 1821
Ship	State	Description
Fanny	United Kingdom	The ship was driven ashore near Troon, Ayrshire. Her crew were rescued.
Juno	United Kingdom	The sloop was wrecked on the Isle of Islay with the loss of all five crew.
Venelia	United Kingdom	The sloop was driven ashore at Dunnet Head, Caithness. Her crew were rescued. She was on a voyage from Belfast, County Antrim to London.

== 19 January ==
List of shipwrecks: 19 January 1821
Ship	State	Description
Isabella	United Kingdom	The ship was abandoned in the Atlantic Ocean. She was on a voyage from New Brunswick, British North America to Liverpool, Lancashire. All on board were rescued by Swift (United Kingdom). Isabella was observed on fire on 22 January.

== 20 January ==
List of shipwrecks: 20 January 1821
Ship	State	Description
Hope	United Kingdom	The ship was driven ashore and wrecked at Loop Head, County Clare. She was on a voyage from London to Limerick.

== 22 January ==
List of shipwrecks: 22 January 1821
Ship	State	Description
Echo	United Kingdom	The ship departed from St. Mary's, Africa for London. No further trace, presumed foundered with the loss of all hands.
Mars	United States	The ship was driven into the quayside at Dover, Kent, United Kingdom and sank. She was declared a total loss.

== 23 January ==
List of shipwrecks: 23 January 1821
Ship	State	Description
Russell	United Kingdom	The ship ran aground on the Haisborough Sands, in the North Sea off the coast of Norfolk. She was refloated but consequently foundered whilst making for Great Yarmouth, Norfolk. Her crew were rescued. Russell was on voyage from Sunderland, County Durham to Weymouth, Dorset.

== 24 January ==
List of shipwrecks: 24 January 1821
Ship	State	Description
Levant	United Kingdom	The ship was wrecked in Almeira Bay. She was on a voyage from Great Yarmouth, Norfolk to Ancona, Papal States.
Orpeo	Spain	The ship was wrecked at A Coruña with the loss of all hands. She was on a voyage from Gibraltar to A Coruña.
Two Brothers	United Kingdom	The ship ran aground on Scroby Sands, Norfolk and consequently foundered off Great Yarmouth. Her crew were rescued.

== 25 January ==
List of shipwrecks: 25 January 1821
Ship	State	Description
Hope for Peace	United States	The ship capsized in the Gulf Stream and was subsequently driven ashore on the coast of East Florida, New Spain on 30 January. Her crew were rescued. She was on a voyage from New Orleans, Louisiana to Charleston, South Carolina.
Lady	(United Kingdom of Great Britain and Ireland) Guernsey	The ship was wrecked on the English Bank. Her crew were rescued. She was on a voyage from Tarragona, Spain to Buenos Aires, Argentina.
Two Sisters	Kingdom of Hanover	The ship foundered off Skagen, Denmark. Her crew were rescued. She was on a voyage from Amsterdam, North Holland, Netherlands to Pillau, Prussia and Ventava, Courland Governorate.

== 26 January ==
List of shipwrecks: 26 January 1821
Ship	State	Description
Supply	United Kingdom	The ship was lost on the coast of East Florida, New Spain. Her crew were rescued. She was on a voyage from Jamaica to Havana, Cuba.

== 29 January ==
List of shipwrecks: 29 January 1821
Ship	State	Description
Eliza	United Kingdom	The ship was driven ashore and wrecked at Kilrush, County Clare She was on a voyage from Trinidad to Cork.
Perseverance	United Kingdom	The ship was wrecked on the Cannon Rock, in the Irish Sea off Strangford, County Antrim with the loss of a crew member. She was on a voyage from Liverpool, Lancashire to Buenos Aires, Argentina.
Virginie	France	The ship foundered whilst on a voyage from Cayenne to Bordeaux, Gironde.

== 30 January ==
List of shipwrecks: 30 January 1821
Ship	State	Description
Harrington	United Kingdom	The ship capsized in a squall at Jamaica. She was on a voyage from Bermuda to London. Harrington was righted the next day.
Intrepid	United States	The ship was wrecked at Jacmel, Haiti.
Magnamine	France	The ship was driven ashore at Marennes, Charente-Maritime. She was on a voyage from Marennes to Antwerp, Netherlands.
Union	United Kingdom	The ship was wrecked 25 leagues (75 nautical miles (139 km)) south of the mouth of the Rio Grande. She was on a voyage from Havana, Cuba to Buenos Aires, Argentina.

== 31 January ==
List of shipwrecks: 31 January 1821
Ship	State	Description
Alert	United Kingdom	The schooner was driven ashore at Foreness Point, Kent. She was on a voyage from Portland, Dorset to London.
Felix Aurora	Portugal	The ship was wrecked on the Cabidello Sands, off Porto. Her crew were rescued.
Teresa	United Kingdom	The ship departed from Harbour Grace, Newfoundland, British North America for Málaga, Spain. No further trace, presumed foundered with the loss of all hands.

== Unknown date ==
List of shipwrecks: Unknown date 1821
Ship	State	Description
Amitie	France	The ship was lost in the Bay of Sior. She was on a voyage from Senegal to Bordeaux, Gironde.
Bulmer	United Kingdom	The ship sailed from Madras on 28 December 1820 and encountered a hurricane that so damaged her that on 6 January 1821 she stopped at Sadras Roads. There she was surveyed, condemned, and sold for breaking up.
Cora	United Kingdom	The ship was lost in the New Shetland Islands.
Dominica Packet	United Kingdom	The ship foundered in the Atlantic Ocean. Her crew were rescued by Midas (United States). Dominica Packet was on a voyage from Londonderry to New York, United States.
Estrella	Portugal	The ship was lost near Tarifa, Spain. She was on a voyage from the Algarve to Genoa, Grand Duchy of Tuscany.
Four Sons	United Kingdom	The ship foundered whilst on a voyage from Puerto Rico to Tobago. Her crew were rescued.
Freundschaft	Bremen	The ship was wrecked by ices in the Hoogenweg.
Harriet	United Kingdom	The ship foundered in Tramore Bay with the loss of all hands. She was on a voyage from Swansea, Glamorgan to Youghall, County Cork.
Henry Newport	United Kingdom	The ship foundered in the Atlantic Ocean with the loss of all but five of her crew. Survivors were rescued by Endeavour (United States).
Indefatigable	United Kingdom	The ship was in collision with HMS Leveret (Royal Navy) and was abandoned in the Atlantic Ocean 100 nautical miles (190 km) west of Land's End, Cornwall. Her crew were rescued by Abeona (United Kingdom). Indefatigable was on a voyage from Saint John, New Brunswick, British North America to London. She came ashore at Land's End, Cornwall on 1 February.
Prosperous	United Kingdom	The ship was driven ashore and wrecked near Cherbourg, Seine-Inférieure, France. She was on a voyage from London to Southampton, Hampshire.
Rapid	United Kingdom	The ship was lost in the Courantine River, Demerara in early January.
Seaflower	United Kingdom	The ship was abandoned in the North Sea on or before 29 January. She was on a voyage from Bridlington, East Riding of Yorkshire to Hull, Yorkshire. Seaflower was taken in to Hull by a pilot boat on 29 January.
St. Giuseppi	Malta	The ship foundered whilst on a voyage from Malta to Genoa, Grand Duchy of Tuscany and Marseille, Bouches-du-Rhône, France.
Tamar	United Kingdom	The ship was wrecked on the "Bocas", She was on a voyage from Puerto Rico to Trinidad.
Thomas	United Kingdom	The ship was abandoned in the Atlantic Ocean. Her crew were rescued by Venus (United Kingdom). She was on a voyage from Quebec, British North America to Liverpool, Lancashire.
Thomas & Henry	United Kingdom	The ship was abandoned in the Atlantic Ocean before 10 January She was on a voyage from Nova Scotia, British North America to Liverpool.
