= José Teixeira =

José Teixeira may refer to:

- José Teixeira (football manager) (1935-2018), Brazilian football manager
- José Roberto Magalhães Teixeira (1937–1996), Brazilian politician

== See also ==
- Josué Teixeira (born 1960), Brazilian football manager
- Diogo Dalot or José Diogo Dalot Teixeira (born 1999), Portuguese professional footballer
- Teixeira (disambiguation)
