= Presidente Bernardes =

Presidente Bernardes, named after President Artur Bernardes, may refer to:

== Places ==
- Presidente Bernardes, Minas Gerais
- Presidente Bernardes, São Paulo

== Other ==
- Presidente Bernardes Refinery, a refinery in Cubatão, Brazil
