= Román Oyarzun Oyarzun =

Spanish political activist and writer

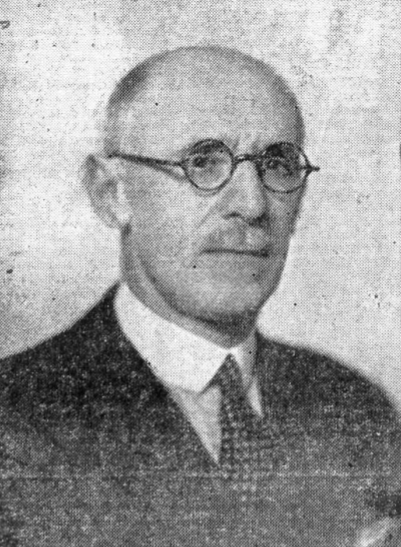
- Born: Román Oyarzun Oyarzun; 1882; Olagüe, Spain
- Died: 1968 (aged 85–86); Pamplona, Spain
- Occupations: lawyer, entrepreneur, publisher, public servant
- Known for: historian
- Political party: Carlism

Román Oyarzun Oyarzun (1882–1968) was a Spanish political activist, publisher, diplomat, entrepreneur and historian. He is best known as author of Historia del Carlismo (1939), for half a century a key reference work on history of Carlism and today considered the classic lecture of Traditionalist historiography. He is also acknowledged as member of the Spanish consular service, briefly editor of a daily El Correo de Guipúzcoa and a Carlist militant himself.

== Family and youth ==
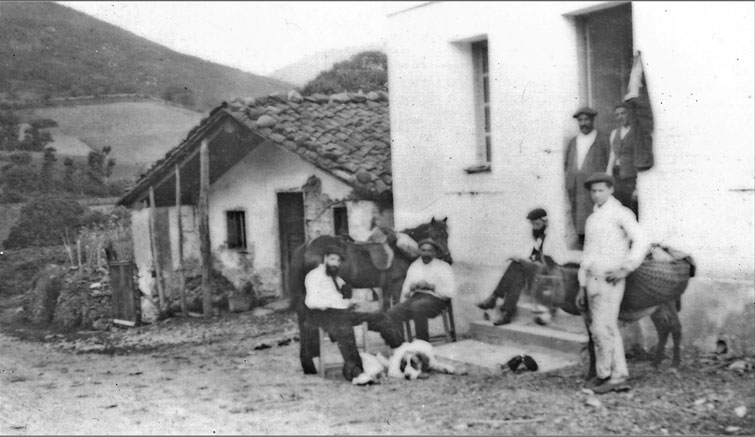
rural Navarre, 1898

The Oyarzun family originated from Valle de Atez, an area in Prepirineos of Northern Navarre. Ethnically Basque Román's ancestors formed part of the agricultural working class, holding plots around the hamlet of Olagüe. His father, Juan Miguel Oyarzun Seminario (1856–1908), ran a petty rural merchant business; though in the 1890s struggling when transporting goods on his mules across the hostile terrain, in the early 20th century he was already operating a few shops. He married a local girl, Patricia Oyarzun; nothing is known either about her family or about a possible kinship between the two. The couple settled in Olagüe; it is not clear how many children they had, apart from Román the other two known are Martina and Victoriano. It seems that they were brought up in a fervently Catholic, militant ambience, perhaps flavored by Integrism; in the early 1890s the parents and children alike are recorded as signing up various letters, e.g. protesting reported mistreatment of the Pope, and printed later in an Integrist newspaper El Siglo Futuro.

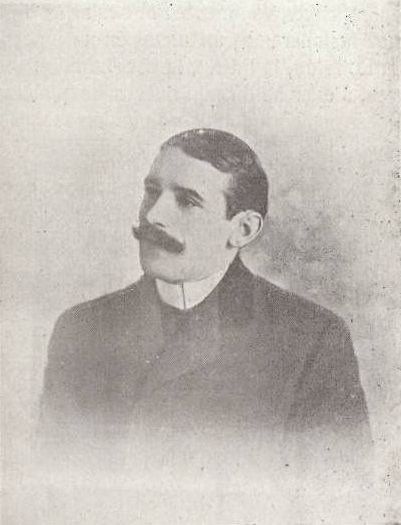
Román Oyarzun (1908)

None of the sources consulted offers any information on early education of Román. Already during his childhood he developed a knack for letters; in 1893 he sent a contribution to the Pamplonese daily El Pensamiento Navarro. Signed "U.E.", it was published and the author was invited to contribute more before his identity was finally revealed. In 1902 he was recorded as excellent student at the Pamplona Instituto Provincial, which might suggest that following bachillerato he trained to be a teacher. At unspecified time he commenced university studies at Universidad Central in Madrid. He first enrolled at law, the curriculum completed "brillantamente" in only two years, to study philosophy and letters later on. Date of him graduating in law is not clear; in philosophy and letters he graduated in 1905. In 1906 he applied for chair of Catédra de Psicología, Lógica, Etica y Rudimentos de Derecho at state colleges in Lerida and Teruel, but was not successful. In 1908 he commenced editorial duties in a San Sebastián daily, El Correo de Guipúzcoa.

In 1911 Román Oyarzun married María de la Concepción Iñarra Sasa (1884–1979); nothing is known about her family. The couple settled in Pamplona, where at that time Román practiced as a lawyer. They had 5 children, born between 1912 and 1923. Román Oyarzun Iñarra served as alférez provisional in the requeté Tercio de Zarate; he and his brother Francisco Javier joined Ministry of Foreign Affairs during the early Francoist era and held various posts in Spanish diplomatic service, assigned to missions across the world though mostly in Latin America. Since the late 1960s serving as ambassadors, they retired in the 21st century; Francisco Javier tried his hand also as historian. María Oyarzun Iñarra served as archivist. Socorro Oyarzun Iñarra was a painter. Teresa Oyarzun Iñarra was a translator and simultaneous interpreter. The son of Francisco Javier, Román Oyarzun Marchesi, followed in the footsteps of his father and grandfather and entered diplomacy, since the 2010s serving in the rank of ambassador.

== Early Carlist engagements ==
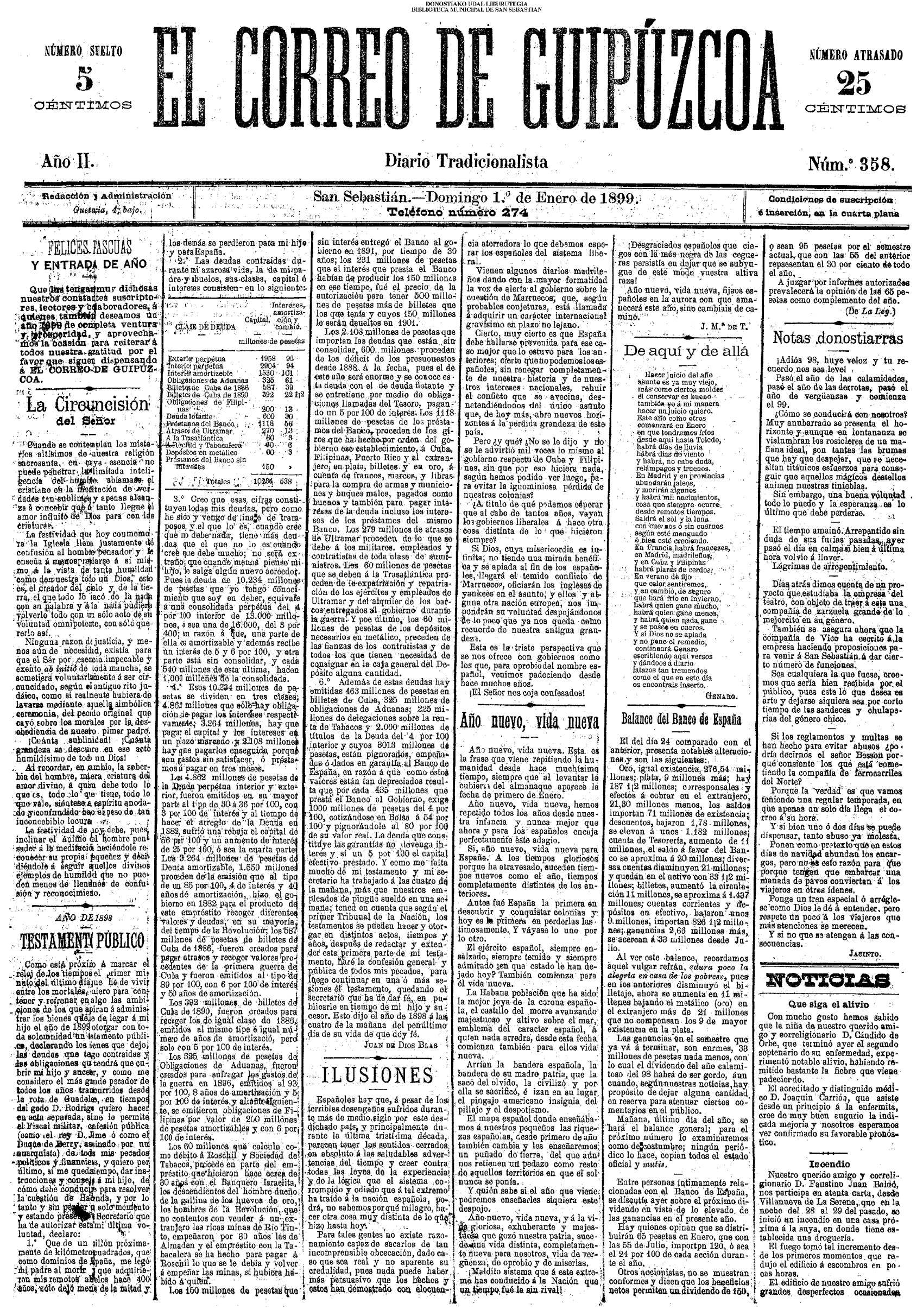
El Correo de Guipúzcoa

It seems that already at home Roman was formed as a Traditionalist, though it is not clear whether of the Integrist or rather of the mainstream Carlist breed. During his academic years he clearly sided with the latter and was noted as member of Juventud Carlista. When back in Pamplona he engaged in party initiatives; apparently considered an erudite, he was entrusted with delivering addresses to local audience, e.g. during opening of a new city círculo in 1906. In early 1908 Oyarzun moved to San Sebastián to join the staff of El Correo de Guipúzcoa, an 1898-founded daily owned by one of the Carlist Vascongadas leaders, José Pascual de Liñán. Oyarzun was contracted as editor-in-chief and maintained militantly Traditionalist, though also vehemently anti-Integrist line of the paper. He contributed to other party initiatives in the region; in 1908 he co-organized a huge meeting demanding reinstatement of Gipuzkoan fueros, known as Acto de Zumárraga. The amassment, claimed politically by the Carlists and Basque nationalists alike, gathered some 25,000 people and was reported in nationwide press. In wake of the feast, El Correo published pieces later denounced as instigation to rebellion; Oyarzun was brought to court. As a lawyer he defended himself and though initially the odds were against him, he was finally absolved. Two years later he resigned from editorial duties quoting family issues and returned to Pamplona.

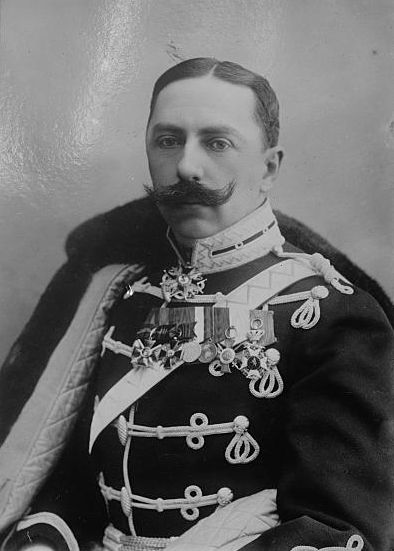
Don Jaime, 1911

In 1910 the Vascongadas party tycoon, Tirso de Olázabal, first advised and then "almost forced" Oyarzun to visit the exiled Carlist king, Don Jaime, in his Frohsdorf residence. The purpose quoted was to gather information for a booklet, though it is also possible that following earlier resignations of Juan Vázquez de Mella and Antero Samaniego, Don Jaime was looking for their successor as his personal secretary. Oyarzun spent some 2 months with his king as unpaid "secretario interino" and according to his own account they went together very well, discussing even Don Jaime's matters of the heart. His king offered Oyarzun the permanent job but he declined; the reason quoted was that already engaged with a fiancé, he was willing to marry. The stay in Austria produced only few correspondence pieces to Navarrese press, saluting Don Jaime as the king who "pregunta por su Patria, á la que no puede ver, como se pregunta la madre que vive lejos y que está en peligro de muerte". Oyarzun's return to Navarre was hastened by news of Mondragón Carlists awaiting trial; Don Jaime asked Oyarzun to defend them in court, which he later did successfully. However, at that point Oyarzun's political engagements were abruptly put on hold. In the 1910s he entered consular service and was assigned abroad, in the 1920s he dedicated himself to business and in the 1930s he resumed his foreign engagements; there is no information on his political or politics-related activities during the period until the mid-1930s.

== Professional intermezzo ==
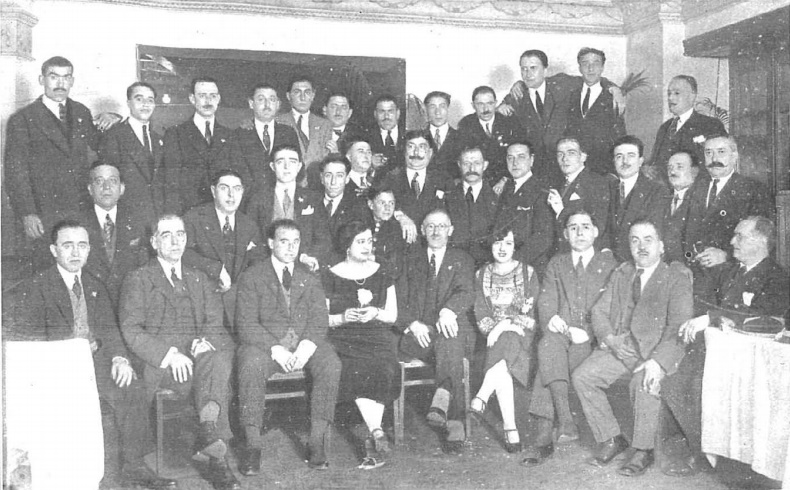
with his employees from Román Oyarzun y Cía, 1925

Advised by a friend, in the spring of 1911 Oyarzun decided to take public examinations for consular service and following brief period of intense learning, he was successful. Assuring his king that he was ready to abandon public duties any moment should the need to "conquistar el trono español" arise, later that year he entered the Spanish consular corps and in 1912 was already vice-consul in Liverpool, holding the post also in 1913 and 1914. Either in 1914 or in 1915 he was promoted and assigned to Rio de Janeiro as commercial attaché, the post held until 1919, when he asked for leave.

In 1919 Oyarzun returned to Spain to launch an own business, which from the onset assumed an impressive shape. He set up a company, named Alpha S.A., which dealt in import and sales of specialized machinery; it opened premises at prestigious locations in Madrid, but also in Barcelona, Valencia, Bilbao, Cádiz, Zaragoza and Vigo. Initially the business covered a wide range of products for domestic use, office purposes, food production and agriculture, mostly small and mid-size tools though at times ranging up to tractors. By the early 1920s the company operated already as Román Oyarzun y Cía. During few years its business model was formatted chiefly to trading in high quality, modern specialized electric kitchen appliances for home usage and dining industry, including dishwashers, mincers, band saw machines, mixers, spiral mixers, graters, peelers, coffee machines, blenders, immersion blenders, scales, roberval balances, blade grinders, wet grinders, cash registers, roasters, cutting machines, kelvinators and other cookingware. Undoubtedly taking advantage of his experience as commercial attaché and personal relations forged, Oyarzun developed the business dynamically; openings of new premises were attended by personalities like US ambassador or president of Círculo Mercantil. In 1928 he was already "opulento hombre de negocios" with own car and own driver. Another milestone step was made in 1932, when near Atocha he moved into a 14,000 square meters building, serving also as an assembly plant; at that stage the company was active also in Portugal and Northern Africa.

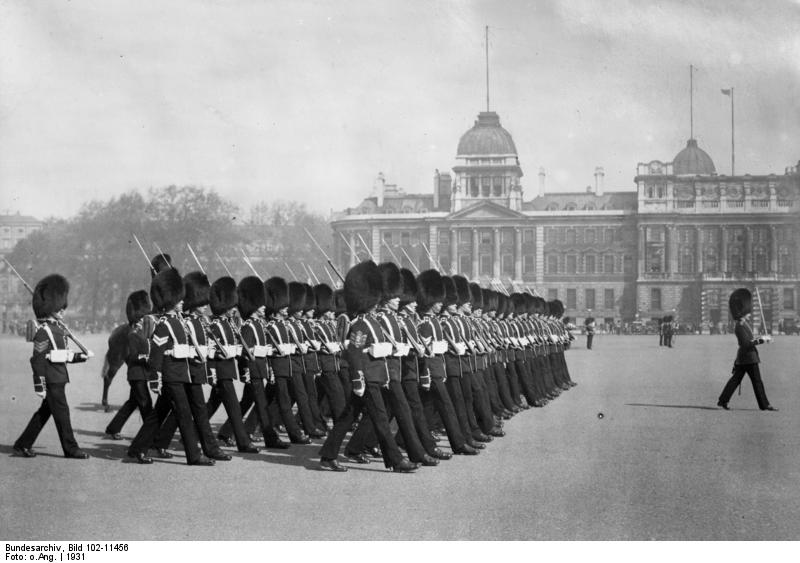
London, 1930s

In parallel to already stable and prosperous business, in January 1931 Oyarzun applied for resumption of consular service and was admitted as agregado commercial de segunda clase. Soon afterwards he was posted to London as commercial attaché. Duration of his service in England is not clear; some sources claim that Oyarzun served as a consul also in Nice, though no dates are given. In particular, it is not known whether Oyarzun was still in London when in 1934 he was appointed to Vienna, promoted to first secretary of the Spanish legacy and accepting his already customary post of commercial attaché, territorially covering Austria, Hungary and Czechoslovakia. He assumed the duties in early 1935.

== Late Carlist engagements ==
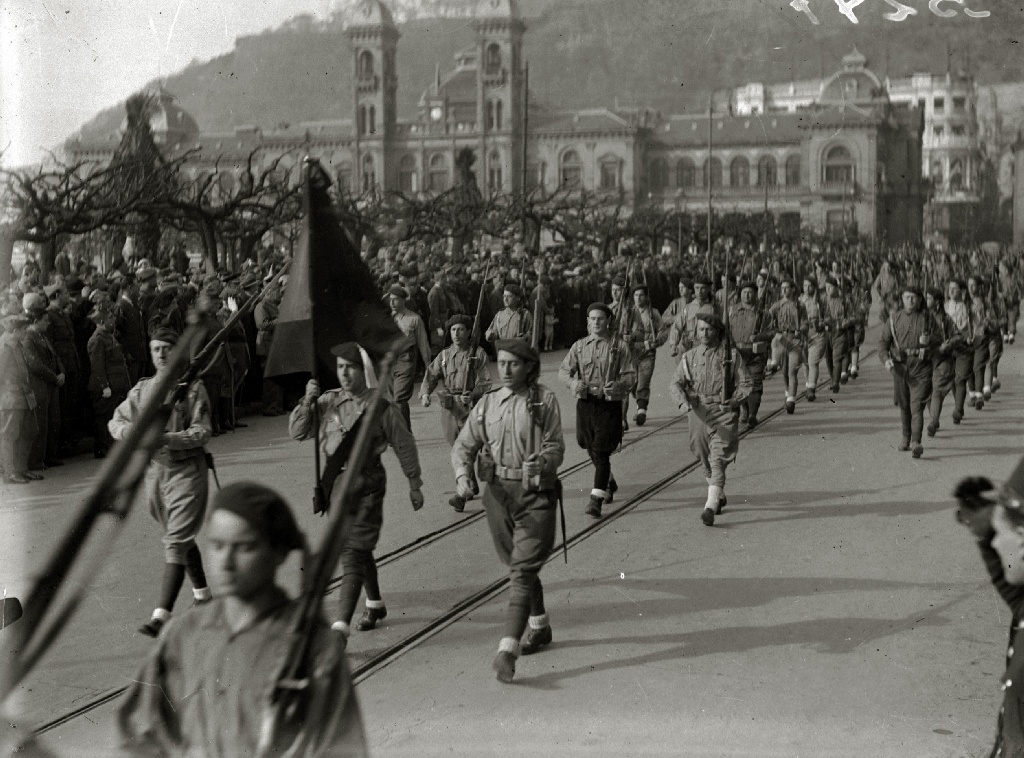
Requeté in San Sebastián, 1936

Prior to 1931 elections Oyarzun lamented Quema de conventos and advocated an alliance of Catholic, monarchist, patriotic and regionalist forces. Entrusted by Don Jaime with launching a Carlist daily, he failed due to financial issues but launched an own Pamplona-based review, Tradición. In the 1936 elections he ran as a Carlist candidate on a joint Candidatura Contrarrevolucionaria ticket in Madrid and failed. The July 1936 coup caught Oyarzun on a diplomatic mission in Vienna. Asked to sign a declaration of loyalty he refused, in his August 2 statement noting that such an act would violate his conscience, especially given the government was dominated "por elementos revolucionarios, comunistas y socialistas revolucionarios". He then travelled to the Nationalist zone offering the Burgos junta his services, only to find that in late September he would have to visit Vienna again: together with a group of top Carlist politicians he attended the funeral of his king Don Alfonso Carlos and in October he visited the new regent Don Javier in his Puchheim residence.

In December 1936 Oyarzun published a press article titled Una idea: Requeté y Fascio; most authors claim it advanced an idea of a union between the Carlists and the Falangists, though few maintain that it rather highlighted the differences. Until some time in 1937 he believed in birth of a foral corporative regime, yet also following the Unification Decree he remained entirely loyal to the emerging Francoist system and occasionally published pieces looking like a praise of Carlist identity within the new national conglomerate. At that time he was already part of the new administration. In late 1936 Oyarzun was nominated Presidente del Comité Ejecutivo de Comercio Exterior, a unit within the Francoist quasi-ministry of economy. Its task was to control private foreign trade by means of licenses; CECE operated until March 1938, when its duties were taken over by Comisión Reguladora. It is not clear whether Oyarzun joined the body; he was rather noted for presence in other minor economy-related institutions. In 1939 he resumed consular service, posted to Perpignan. It is known that his assignment did not expire before 1944.

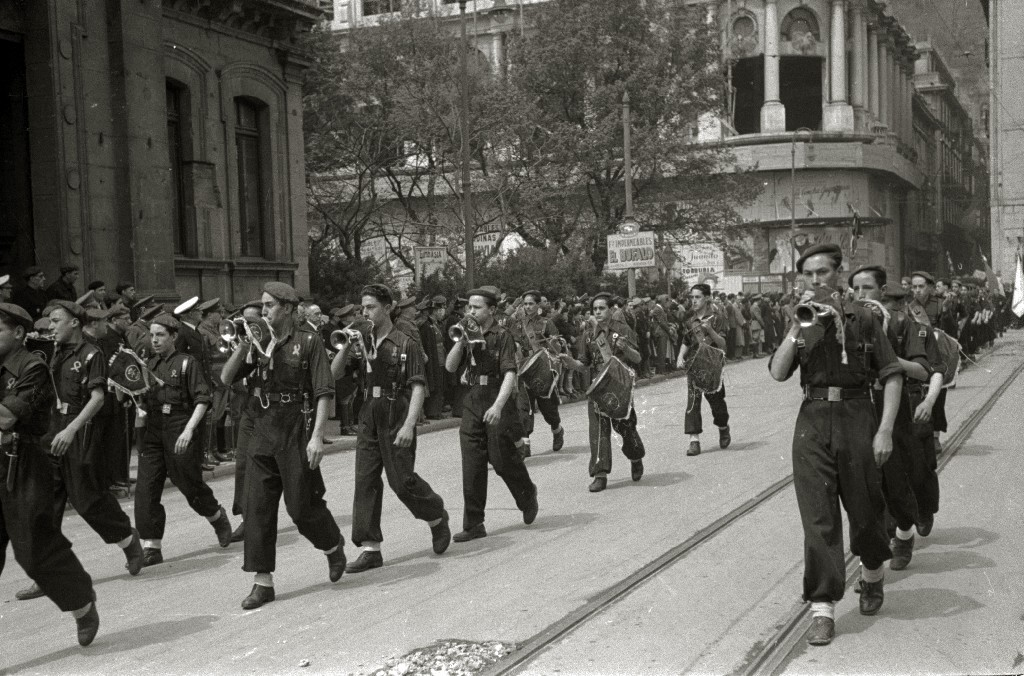
Francoism, 1940s

In a 1945 text Oyarzun criticized Don Javier for protracting the regency and lamented bewilderment among the Carlists, yet he offered no solutions. He refrained from taking an active stand and withdrew into his Pamplona privacy, limiting himself to the observer's role. Over time he started to consider himself sort of an appendix to an extinguished idea, as he declared the Carlist dynasty finished and Carlism "reduced into debris and ashes". Priding himself on cool matter-of-fact analysis, he considered the monarchist idea in decline with the throne vacant and no appropriate candidate, yet in 1965 he bothered to publish a work intended to counter the Juanista propaganda. At least in terms of would-be monarchy he seemed entirely put up with the prospect of Franco's personal decision. He did not engage in Francoist propaganda, yet by Traditionalists he was considered a Francoist and an ex-Carlist.

== Historian ==
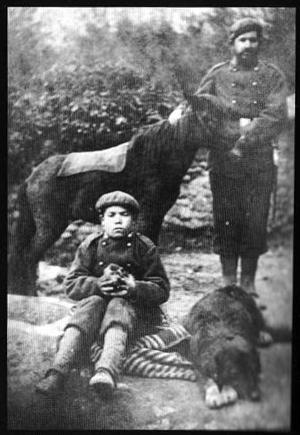
a Carlist, a boy, a pottok and a dog, 1872

A trained historian, until his late 50s Oyarzun did not try his hand in the field. The first incursion into the area was a 1935 translation from English, Campaña de doce meses en Navarra y las Provincias Vascongadas con el general Zumalacárregui. During the Civil War he wrote Historia del Carlismo, first published in 1939, considered his opus magnum and re-published in 1944, 1954, 1965, 1969, 2008 and 2013. Vida de Ramón Cabrera y las guerras carlistas, a study on the Carlist commander from the First Carlist War, went into print in 1961, in 1964 followed by similarly formatted work focusing on a far less known military, El alavés D. Bruno de Villarreal, teniente general carlista. Pretendientes al trono de España (1965) was a political pamphlet rather than a historiographic work, while Nacimiento, vida, muerte y resurrección de los sacerdotes obreros (1966) appeared as a somewhat unexpected glossa to Vaticanum II, a discussion of socially minded French and Spanish priests of the early 20th century, the phenomenon Oyarzun witnessed and sympathized with himself.

The work which earned Oyarzun name in the Spanish historiography is his History of Carlism. Though historiographic and especially political literature on Carlism had already been massive, the only precedent work attempting an overall history of the movement was Historia de la guerra civil y de los partidos liberal y carlista by Antonio Pirala Criado. The study was first published in 1858 and prolonged systematically in following editions, the last one of 1906 covering the period up to the 1870s; it is usually considered a high-quality, fairly non-partisan account. Oyarzun's proposal, originally to be titled Compendio de Historia del Carlismo, immediately replaced outdated Pirala's work as the first reference book on history of Carlism, the position it would occupy itself for the next half of a century. Once completed the author did not re-edit the work for further releases; except minor changes, the 1939 and the 1969 versions almost do not differ.

Carlist standard

Historia del Carlismo is structured in 33 chapters and covers the period from the 1830s to the 1930s. Its focus is clearly on military history, as the two Carlist wars are covered in 23 chapters; in comparison, the 60-year-long period after 1876 is treated in 4 chapters. Belligerent threads aside Oyarzun is concerned primarily with politics, much attention dedicated also to personalities and some to the doctrine; social transformations and economic issues are generally treated marginally. Since the author ignores non-Carlist Traditionalism the book tends to emphasize the dynastic question as the backbone of Carlism, especially that with the death of Alfonso Carlos he considers the Carlist history to be over. Like most synthetic works Historia does not contain references to sources, which might be a problem given at times it is referenced as a source itself. Except the epilogue narration is generally far from zealous style, and represents a midpoint between somewhat bombastic Oyarzun's pieces from the 1900s and his embittered, skepticism-ridden writings from the 1960s.

== Reception and legacy ==
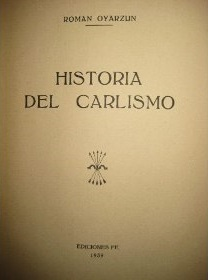
Historia del Carlismo

Already during the Republic days Oyarzun's translation was received rather well. Later monographs on Cabrera and Villareal were acclaimed and the former rewarded. Historia del Carlismo was welcome by scholars and the public alike as certified by numerous re-editions, especially that the narrative ended conveniently in 1936 and did not pose a challenge to the official Francoist propaganda. Until the 1990s it remained the key concise volume on Carlist history, with an alternative offered only by massive and detailed series of Melchor Ferrer, appearing between the early 1940s and the late 1970s. As a primary source of scholarly reference Oyarzun's synthesis was replaced as late as in the late 20th century, by the 1990-1992 works of Clemente and especially by the 2000 work of Canal. Until today it remains a must-have bibliographic entry of every work dealing with the Carlist history until the Civil War; a 2008 PhD dissertation declared it "the main reference work" and indeed another one of 2012 referred it 45 times. Until recently, it was counted among " clásicas obras", acknowledged as "una obra a un tiempo de corte clásico y moderno", "obra clásica sobre la historia del carlismo", "síntesis ya clásica"

Since the late 20th century the general reception of Historia del Carlismo has changed. It is now typically placed within "Traditionalist historiography", which usually though not always serves as a euphemism for bias and partiality. Denied the credit of "objective or professional historiographic attention" and "histoire critique", the work is considered ""un breviario de partido", "propaganda carlista", "prosa partidista", "very partisan", "quite one sided", "apologetic", falling into the rubric of "narrative, uncritical, and often hagiographic", "sin ningun distancia respecto al objeto de estudio" and at times not only Traditionalist, but even "ultratradicionalista". Some concede that among partisan authors, Oyarzun offers "nearest approximation", "readable" and "best one-volume narrative"; cases of referring Oyarzun without stigmatizing him first tend to be fairly rare. In the recent history of Spanish historiography Oyarzun's work is spared a damning judgement as equipped with "una seña de identidad bibliográfica que reunía los requisitos mínimos para sobrepasar el radio de partidarios y simpatizantes".

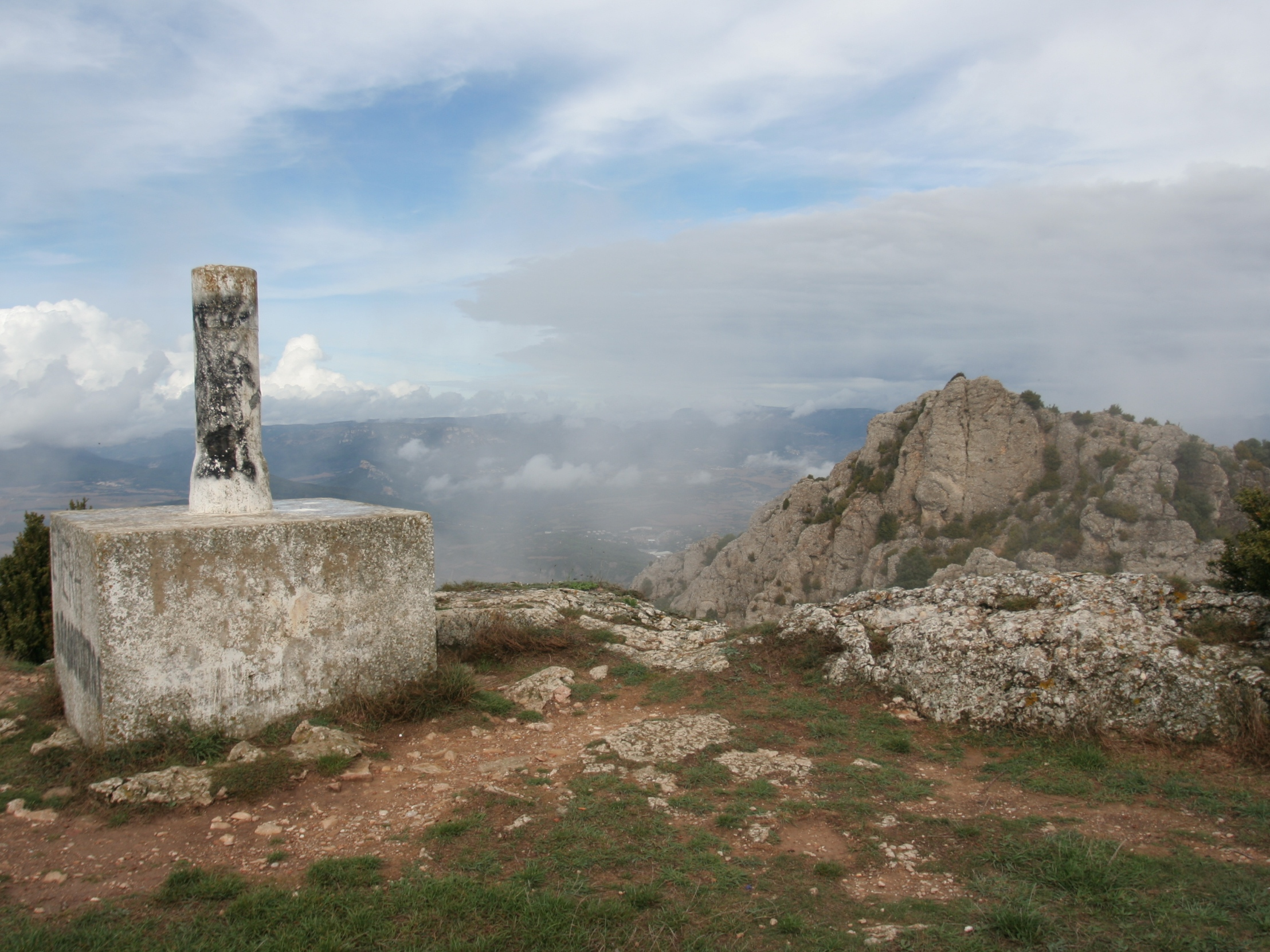
Montejurra, 2014

Within the Traditionalist camp Oyarzun was not spared criticism, up to the point of near-dismissal of the work altogether and getting declared a heterodox. His perceived pride in technocratic, no-nonsense "let’s get real" stand was deemed responsible for excessive and unfair challenge on allegedly spiritual and romantic nature of Carlism. He was charged with dedicating too much attention to heterodoxes and secessions and too little to some of the Carlist triumphant episodes. Apart from customary charges related to bias, the other ones raised most often are insufficient source criticism, overfocus on dynastic issues and military history, entanglement in juridical hair-splitting, ignorance as to the social dimension, downplaying religious issues, failure to investigate the link to peripheral nationalisms, factual errors, reducing internal debates and secessions to personal squabbles, unduly emphasis – bordering obsession - on the Integrist thread and rejection of menendezpelayista perspective of examining the cultural fabric.

== See also ==
- Traditionalism (Spain)
