= Tejeda (disambiguation) =

Tejeda is a municipality in the island of Gran Canaria, Spain.

Tejeda may also refer to:

== People ==
- Adalberto Tejeda Olivares (1883–1960), Mexican politician, who served two terms as Governor of Veracruz
- Altaír Tejeda de Tamez (1922–2015), Mexican writer
- Anay Tejeda (born 1983), Cuban hurdler
- Carlos Tejeda (born 1980), Venezuelan volleyball player
- Frank Tejeda (1945–1997), decorated United States Marine and politician
- Gladys Tejeda (born 1985), Peruvian long-distance runner
- Robinson Tejeda (born 1982), Dominican professional baseball player
- Sebastián Lerdo de Tejada (1827–1889), jurist and ex-president of Mexico
- Yeltsin Tejeda (born 1992), Costa Rican footballer

== Places ==
- Camarón de Tejeda, a town in Veracruz, Mexican
- Camarón de Tejeda (municipality), a municipality in Veracruz, Mexican
- Chicontepec de Tejeda, a municipality in Veracruz, Mexican
- Sierra de Tejeda, a mountain range in Andalusia, Spain
- Tejeda de Tiétar, a municipality in Cáceres, Extremadura, Spain
- Tejeda y Segoyuela, a municipality in Salamanca, Castile and León, Spain

== See also ==
- Tejada (disambiguation)
- Tejedor, a surname
- Tejera (disambiguation)
