= Tejada =

Tejada may refer to:

- Tejada (surname)
- Tejada, Province of Burgos, Castile and León, Spain
- Tejada (Huelva), historical town located in Huelva
- Lerdo de Tejada (Monterrey Metro)
- Puerto Tejada, Cauca, Colombia
- Taifa of Tejada, medieval kingdom in modern Spain

== See also ==
- Tejeda (disambiguation)
- Tejera (disambiguation)
