= Melchor Ferrer Dalmau =

Spanish historian and Carlist militant

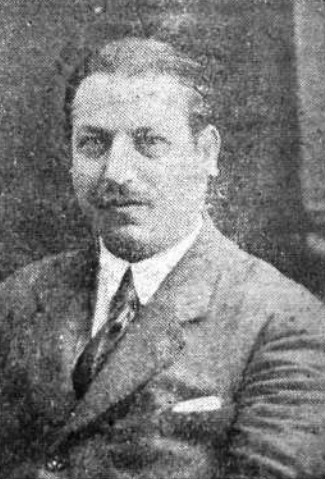
- Dalmau in 1935
- Born: Melchor Ferrer Dalmau; 1888; Mataró, Spain
- Died: 1965 (aged 76–77); Valencia, Spain
- Occupations: publisher, writer
- Known for: historian, publisher
- Political party: Carlism

Melchor Ferrer Dalmau (1888–1965) was a Spanish historian and a Carlist militant. He is known mostly as principal author of a massive, 30-volume series titled Historia del tradicionalismo español, considered fundamental work of reference for any student of Carlism. Ferrer is recognized also as "periodista" (journalist), chief editor of a national and a few local traditionalist dailies and contributor to a number of others. Politically he maintained a low profile, though periodically he was member of the party executive, and during internal party strife of the early 1960s his support might have tipped the balance in favor of the progressist faction.

== Family and youth ==
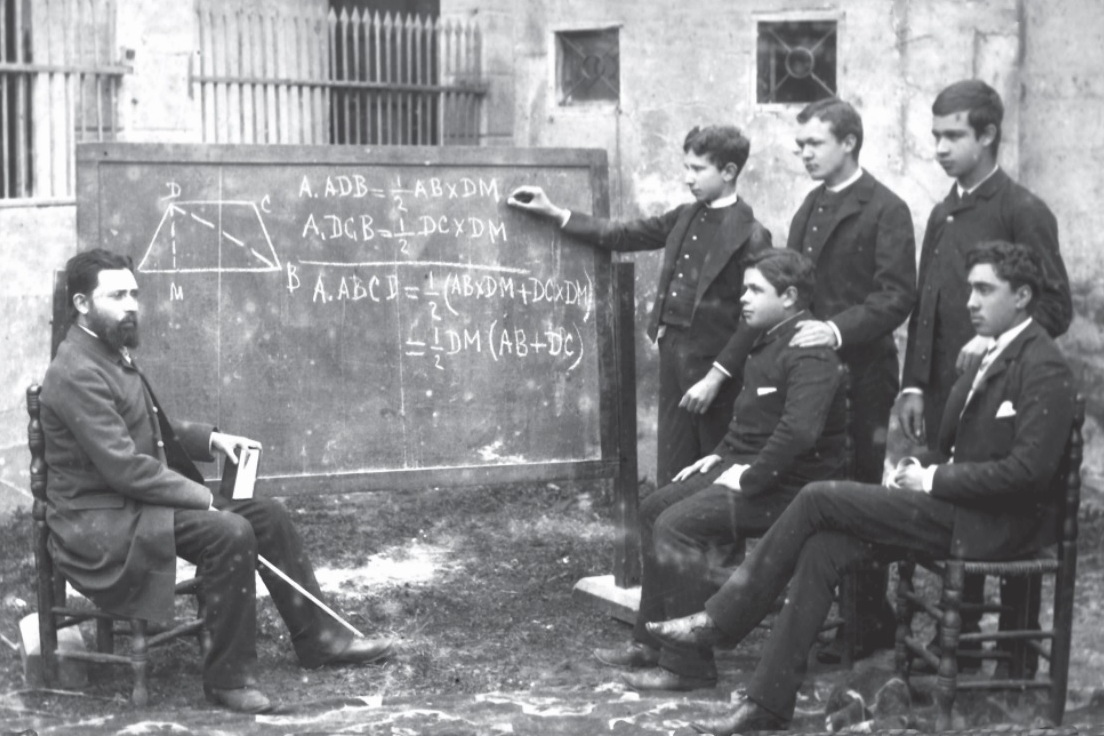
Ferrer Arman teaching, 1870

Ferrer counts among the oldest and most common names in Catalonia; one family lived in the town of Mataró, where in the 14th century it was first noted when turning from "lo ferrer" to "lo Fferrer". They grew into prominence as traders and bankers in the 15th century, dubbed "primera familia de patricis de Mataró". Some of them held high posts in the Principality, e.g. emerging as its general treasurers in the 16th century and becoming key representatives of the emerging Catalan bourgeoisie in the 17th and 18th century. The family got very branched later on, also in the Latin America. None of the sources consulted specifies which branch Melchor descended from and little is known about his grandfather, Antonio Ferrer, a cord manufacturer ("cordonero").

The father of Melchor, Antonio Ferrer Arman (1845?–1899), in the 1860s studied engineering in Barcelona In 1870 he applied for a job at Instituto de Tarragona but failed, eventually he landed a teaching position in the Valldemia college, which at that time was already run by the Piarists. Though during his youth he demonstrated some penchant for Liberal ideas, during the Third Carlist War he sided with the legitimists and volunteered to Carlist troops; details of his service are unknown, except that he grew to an officer and served under command of Rafael Tristany. Having returned to Mataró in the mid-1880s he became first headmaster of the newly founded Escuela de Artes y Oficiales and remained at this post until his death, teaching mathematics. In the 1890s he was also active as ingeniero municipal, land surveyor and tonnage inspector, co-founder of Associació Artístich-Arqueológica Mataronesa and author of semi-scientific works, like Geometria analítica (1898). He is counted among local Mataró intellectuals who contributed to conservative Catholic Catalanism in the area, collaborating e.g. with Josep Puig i Cadafalch. Ferrer Arman married Teresa Dalmau Gual, originating from Matanzas in Cuba; nothing is known about her family, apart from the fact that they were also of Catalan origin and may have had a Naviera business.

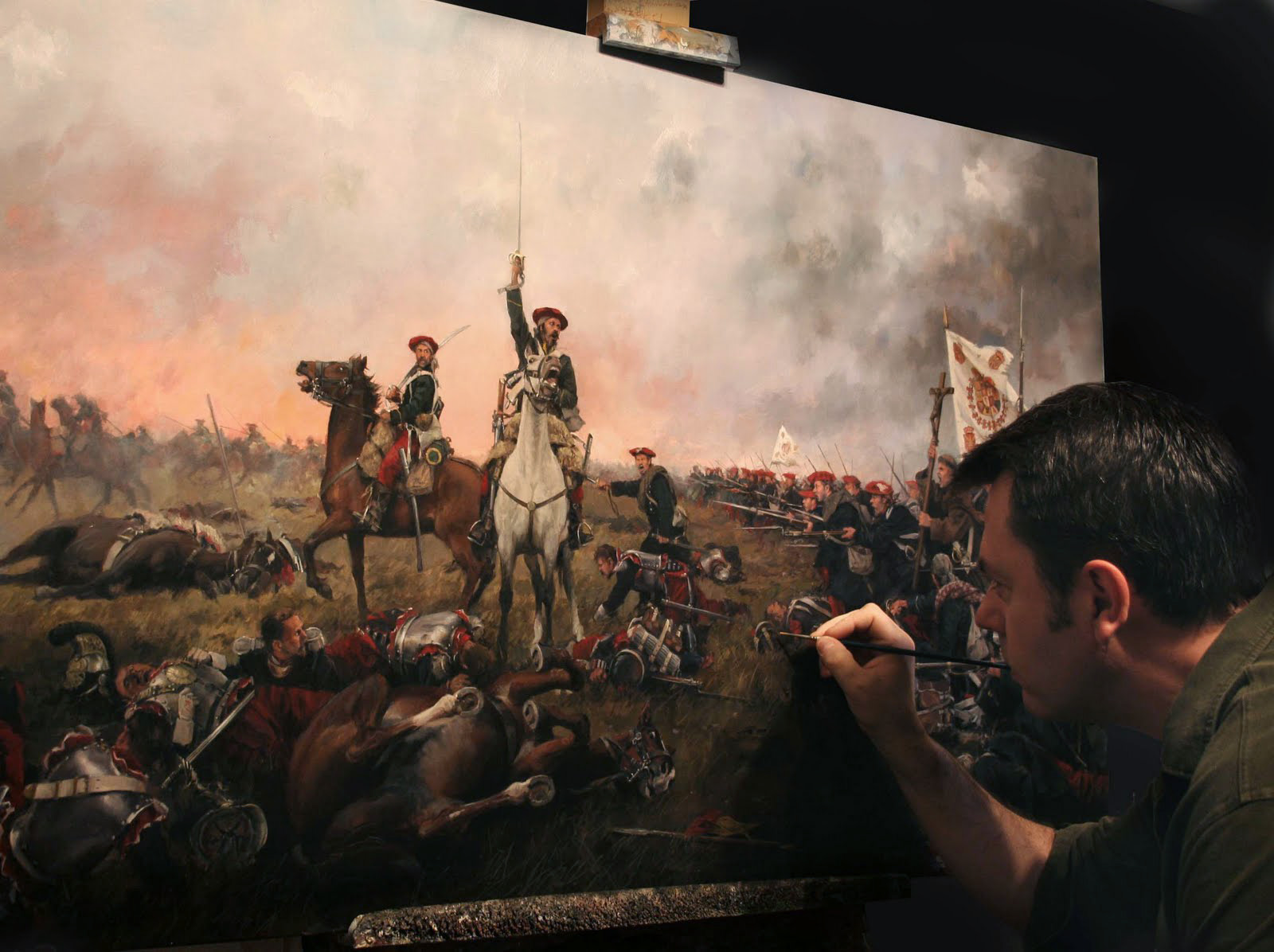
Ferrer-Dalmau Nieto at work, 2013

The couple had at least 4 children; Melchor was born among the youngest ones. His older brothers, Antonio and Augusto, graduated as engineers and developed own textile and chemical businesses in Barcelona and Valencia. Melchor was first educated in the Mataró Piarist college and then in Instituto de Barcelona. Like his siblings he trained to become an engineer and received technical education at Escuela de Ingenieros Industriales y Textiles in the nearby Terrassa. It is not clear if he graduated, yet Melchor has never pursued a related career; in 1910 he commenced co-operation with Catalan journals. In 1920 he married Paquita Rubio García; nothing is known about her except that she came from a military family. The couple remained childess, yet Melchor and his sister-in-law Elvira Bonet had one son, Xavier Ferrer Bonet, a later Partido Carlista acitivist and writer. Augusto Ferrer-Dalmau Nieto, a well-known painter specializing in historical military themes, is the great-grandson of Melchor's brother.

== Restoration ==
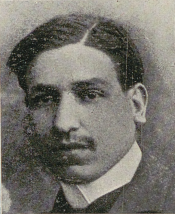
in 1912

With his father a Carlist combatant and older brothers engaged in Carlist activities, Melchor followed suit in his youth. During academic years he joined the Barcelona section of Juventud Tradicionalista. From the onset he demonstrated interest in the realm of communication in general and newspapers in particular. Engaged in Sección de Prensa and becoming president of "sub-sección de ventas" he supported sales of Traditionalist papers beyond usual distribution channels; he was also member of Junta Directiva of Sección de Propaganda. First contributing minor pieces to youth and party bulletins, in 1910 he formally entered the editorial board of El Correo Catalán, an established Barcelona-based daily and a regional Carlist mouthpiece. It is not clear what his work consisted of and whether the young Ferrer published pieces of his own; he kept working for Correo until 1914.

Though Ferrer delivered lectures at meetings of Carlist paramilitary organisation requeté he had no military experience himself when in 1914, heavily influenced by Maurras and admirer of L'Action Française, he decided to join the French army and fight the Germans. The Republican press ridiculed him as a future field marshal, though with no news of his whereabouts Ferrer was first feared dead in combat. In fact things turned out oddly, yet the entire episode is far from clear. According to contemporary press the pro-German stand of Correo combined with anonymous denunciation cost Ferrer arrest; presumed to be a spy, he was court-martialled in Lyon but spared a sentence ending up in Légion étrangère, the fate he accepted with resignation as result of his idealistic and perhaps childish "chiquillada". Other accounts either deny the arrest episode or simply claim that Ferrer volunteered to the legion. This way or another, Ferrer served in the Foreign Legion in Champagne and grew to NCO before being released in 1918.

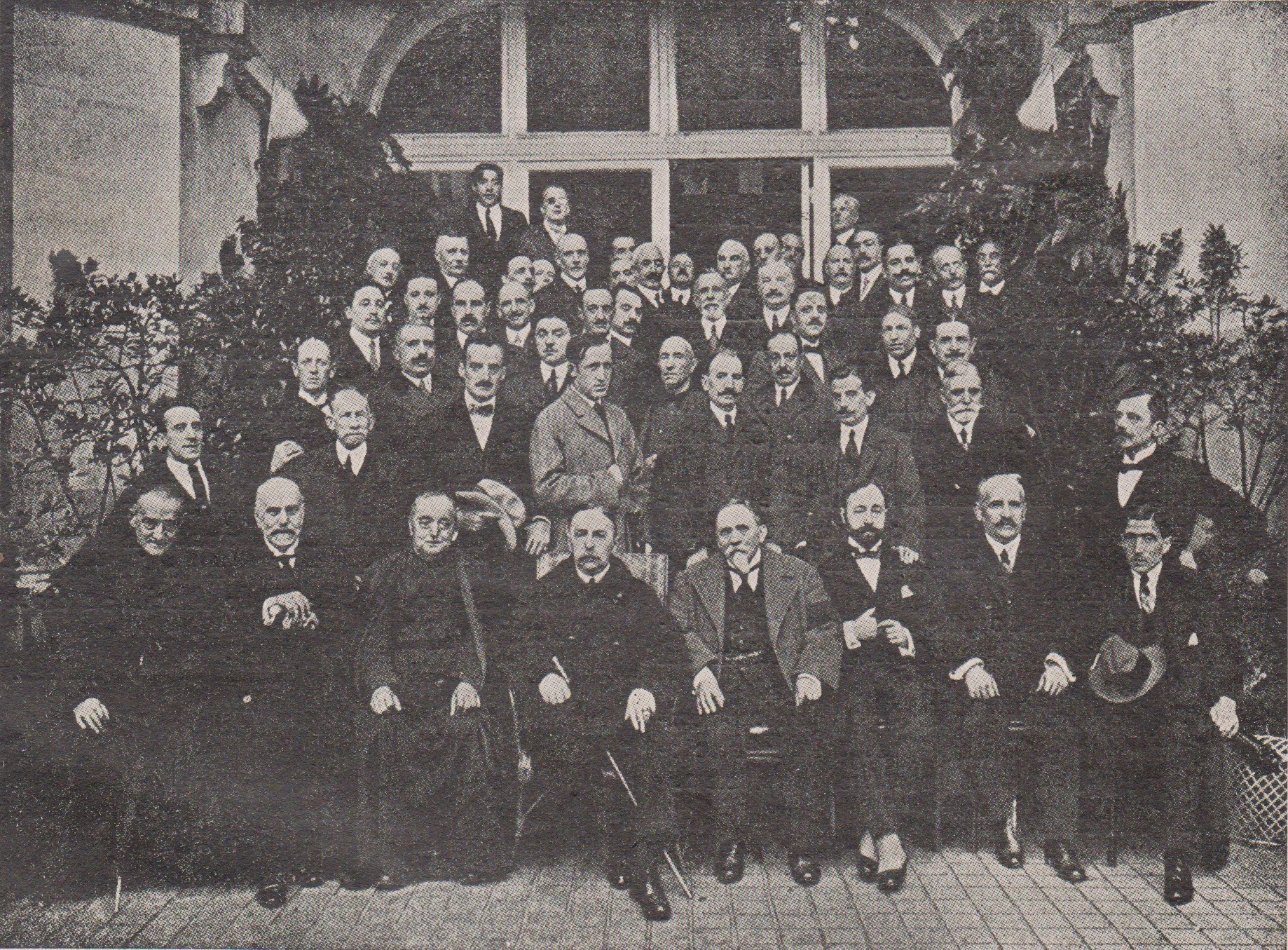
Magna Junta de Biarritz, 1919

In late 1918 and early 1919 Ferrer spent some time in Paris; it is there he entered the entourage of the Carlist pretender Don Jaime. The two found common ground, not unlikely given their shared francophilia. As a result, upon his return to Spain in the spring Ferrer was nominated director político of El Correo Español, the Madrid daily serving as national Carlist mouthpiece; his task was to ensure loyalty of the newspaper, so far controlled by the dissenting Mellista faction. As he was largely unknown beyond Catalonia some Carlist heavyweights suspected dirty tricks on part of Don Jaime's secretary Melgar and asked for confirmation, which finally permitted Ferrer to assume his post. His mission proved successful; though Mellista defection decimated Carlist ranks, Correo maintained loyalty to the claimant. Ferrer remained in close touch with his king; he used to travel to Paris for consultations and in late 1919 took part in the massive gathering known as Magna Junta de Biarritz, where he represented Castilla La Nueva. He also toured Spain, trying to save what was left of the crumbling Carlist organisation. Ferrer's term in Correo lasted until mid-1920; it is not clear why he left the daily.

== Dictatorship, Republic and War ==
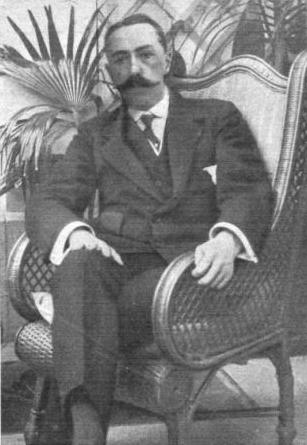
Don Jaime, 1920s

It does not seem that Ferrer left Correo because of discrepancies with his king; quite to the contrary, in the movement plagued by defections and by some considered dead he remained among most loyal individuals and a bulwark against the Mellistas. His position was confirmed when at unspecified time in the 1920s Ferrer became secretario particular – sort of a personal secretary – to Don Jaime himself. None of the sources consulted clarifies whether he moved to Paris when performing the new job, yet his contributions kept appearing in numerous dailies and periodicals, including the French ones. Some scholars suggest he might have been involved in efforts to animate the Requeté organisation across Spain and that Ferrer might have also contributed to loose preparations to stage an eventually cancelled Carlist anti-primoderiverista coup in Seu d’Urgell in 1928; Ferrer himself points rather to his older brother Antonio. Another scholar claims that Ferrer remained the secretary of Don Jaime until the Carlist king died in late 1931.

In late 1930 Ferrer assumed management of Diario Montañés, a conservative Santander daily strongly flavored with Traditionalism. Circumstances of his appointment are not known; it is neither clear how it could have been reconciled with alleged work for Don Jaime. Ferrer's term in Santander lasted almost 5 years and seems rather successful, at least in terms of mobilizing support for the cause; during the Republican period the Cantabrian Carlism enjoyed its revival. Ferrer contributed also by attending various meetings, where he used to give lectures. In 1931 he published one of his few theoretical booklets and penned pieces to a Santanderine review Tradición. Apart from those discussing ideological threads, some were also his first incursions into the field of history, like piece on aristocratic titles conceded by Carlist monarchs or a summary of party's political leadership during the previous half a century.

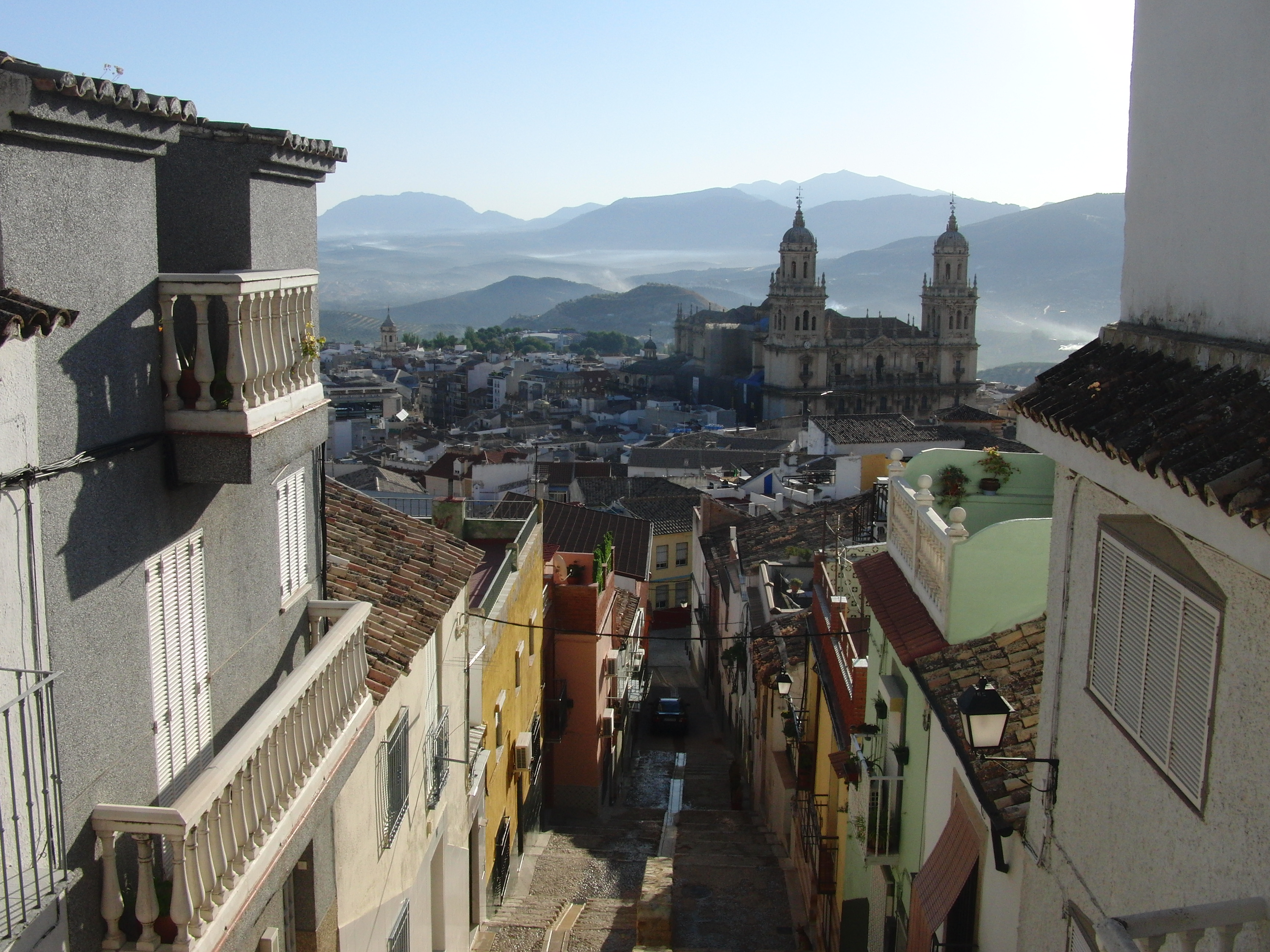
Jaén (current view)

In early 1935 Ferrer moved from the coast of Biscay to Andalusia, where he assumed management of the local daily Eco de Jaén. A recently established newspaper, it was in fact successor to El Pueblo Católico, a Traditionalist daily issued since 1893 by Francisco Ureña Navas; the latter underwent ownership changes and finally closed, to be reborn under a new name. When Ferrer took over the daily was still shaped by its previous Integrist heritage; Ferrer brought it fully into Carlist orthodoxy and converted into a modern newspaper. Like in Santander, he supported the Carlist buildup by attending local meetings and mobilizing support. It is not clear whether Ferrer contributed to or was even aware of the Carlist anti-Republican conspiracy; one author claims the 1936 coup caught him by surprise. Eco de Jaén operated until late July, when first its premises were ransacked and then the paper was turned into the mouthpiece of local Frente Popular. Having lost his job Ferrer was subject to unspecified persecution and harassment, yet he survived the revolutionary terror. After almost 3 years in the Republican zone Jaén was captured by the Nationalists in late March 1939.

== Early Francoism ==
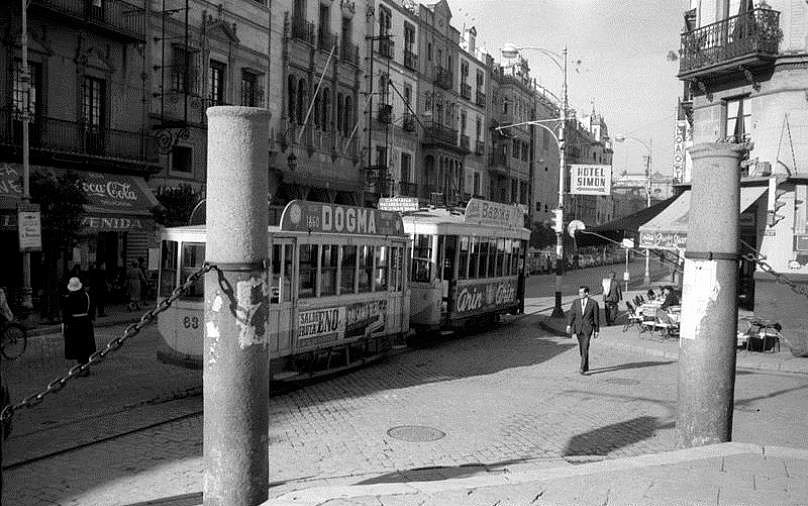
Seville, early post-war period

Shortly after the Nationalist takeover of Jaén Ferrer moved to Seville; the local Carlist daily La Unión was subject to heavy censorship measures and its head Domingo Tejera ceded management to Ferrer in hope to spare the newspaper. However, the Francoist structures were determined not to tolerate dissenting party titles and La Unión closed on 31 December 1939. Ferrer's position went from bad to worse when he refused to join the new state party, Falange Española Tradicionalista, and its syndicate press structures; as a result, in 1941 he got his press license revoked. It is not clear how Ferrer made a living; at unspecified time he assumed teaching duties in the local Escuela Náutica San Telmo and at preparatory courses to entry exams to military academies. It is in the early 1940s that he started publishing Historia del tradicionalismo español, a series which would become the source of income but which also in few years would earn him – still fairly unknown in the Carlist realm across Spain – enormous prestige nationwide.

Since the mid-1940s Ferrer was taking part in resumed meetings of Consejo Nacional Carlista, the National Carlist executive. The nature of his mandate is unclear, as he did not held formal posts in the party structures; it was probably related to his personal friendship with the Carlist leader Manuel Fal Conde, also resident of Seville. Confronted with growing fragmentation and bewilderment among the Traditionalists Ferrer maintained total loyalty to the regent Don Javier and used his pen to fight off competing factions. His 1946 booklet Observaciones de un viejo carlista a unas cartas del Conde de Rodezno was aimed against those advancing Don Juan as a legitimate Carlist heir. The 1948 booklet Observaciones de un viejo carlista sobre las pretensiones de un Príncipe al trono de España was aimed against Carloctavismo; offering "a ultranza" defense of the regency in insulting style Ferrer ridiculed Carlos VIII and the cause of "farsa carloenchufista que encubre un carlofascismo de ocasión". Acknowledging the apparent stabilization of the regime in 1949 Ferrer advocated change of the Carlist strategy; instead of courting potentially rebellious generals he suggested popular mobilization.

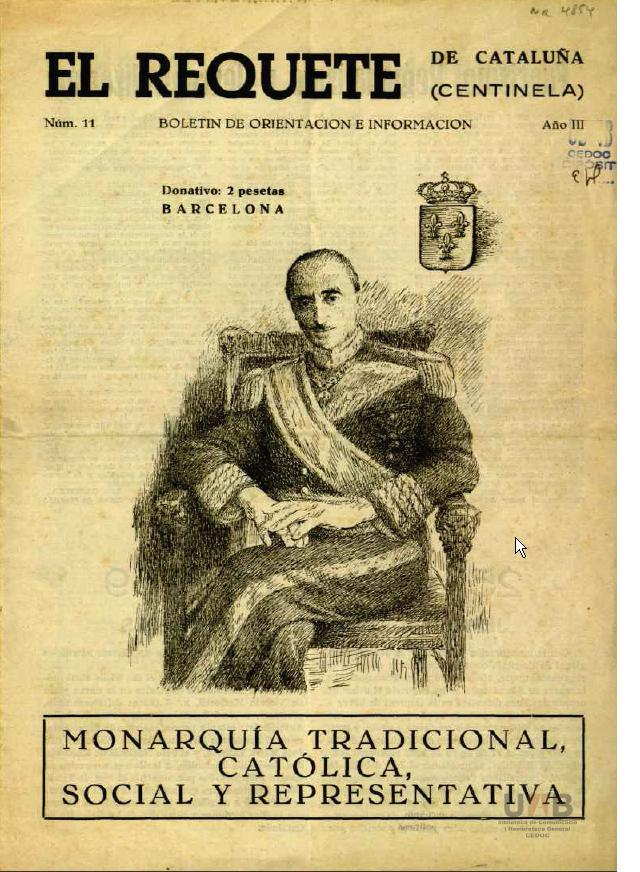
Javier I, 1950s

It is not clear whether uncompromising position of Ferrer from the onset encompassed also suggestions to replace the regency with personal Don Javier's claim to the throne; this stand prevailed among the Carlist executive in the early 1950s and Ferrer remained in line. He co-worked to prepare documents, made public during the Eucharistic Congress in Barcelona in 1952, which acknowledged Don Javier as a legitimist monarch. Unwavering loyalty to the Borbón-Parmas, which was already becoming sort of Ferrer's trademark, was further demonstrated in a booklet released in 1955; anonymous though generally attributed to Ferrer, it was distributed by the Carlist academic youth mostly in Madrid. Designed as response to earlier Franco's meeting with Don Juan and increasing prospects of Alfonsists restoration, the booklet denounced such a possibility as treason to the spirit of July 1936, allegedly shaped by a pact between the Carlists and the military.

== Mid-Francoism ==
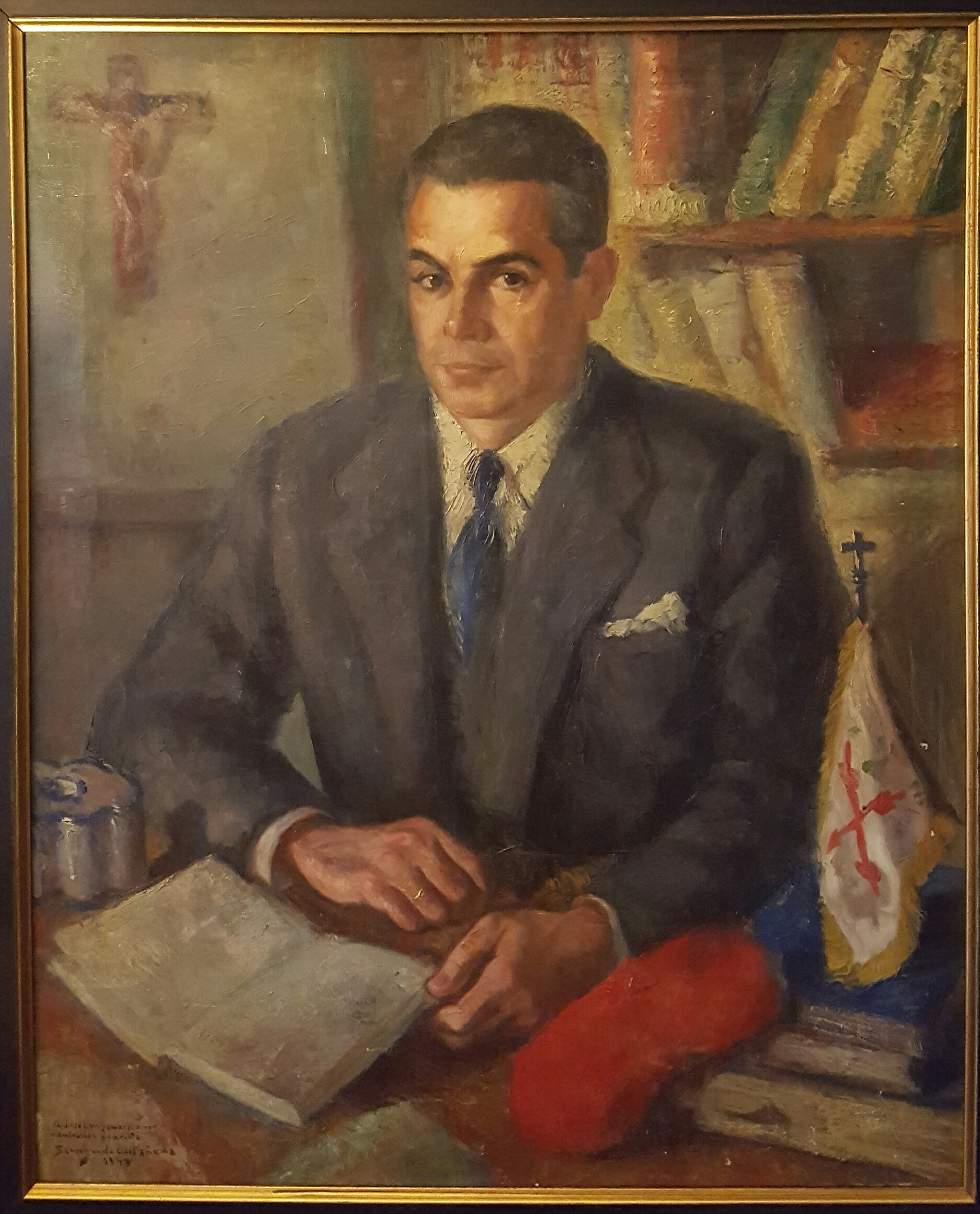
Zamanillo

Ferrer was very uneasy about 1955 Fal's dismissal from political leadership and pro-collaborationist turn of the party. During a 1956 meeting of the executive he warned about a forthcoming Franco-Juanista maneuver dubbed "Plan Artajo", yet he remained totally loyal to his king, to the new strategy he sponsored and to the new party leader, José María Valiente; he remained on fairly good terms with the latter. In the late 1950s Ferrer's historiographic production assumed already massive scope and earned him enormous prestige in the party ranks. It was reflected by his continuous presence at executive sessions; in 1960 he was even entrusted with writing sort of a rulebook for organization of Consejo Nacional sittings. In 1961 he entered a newly formed Comisión de Cultura; as censorship eased, he contributed to Comisión's mouthpiece Reconquista, bulletins of Circulos Vázquez de Mella and other new periodicals like Montejurra.

Until the early 1960s Ferrer's actual impact on Carlist politics remained marginal; his position was rather this of a patriarch, scarcely involved in day-to-day business. This changed when discrepancies between the old Traditionalist guard and the unorthodox Carlist youth became visible. Ferrer tended to side with the latter, guided not that much by their theoretical innovations but rather by their absolute and unconditional loyalty to the Borbón-Parmas. In 1961 he opposed attempts to set up a board co-ordinating Carlist propaganda, put forward by orthodoxes concerned with new tones advanced by periodicals like Azada y Asta. Ferrer remained also on excellent terms with leader of the youth, Don Javier's oldest son Don Carlos Hugo, though initially he was perplexed by the bachelor status of the prince. When the Traditionalists, led by José Luis Zamanillo, started to mount an opposition strategy against the Huguistas, Ferrer did not hesitate to confront them. In 1962 he accused Zamanillo – due to his requeté past enormously respected in the party ranks – of inactivity.

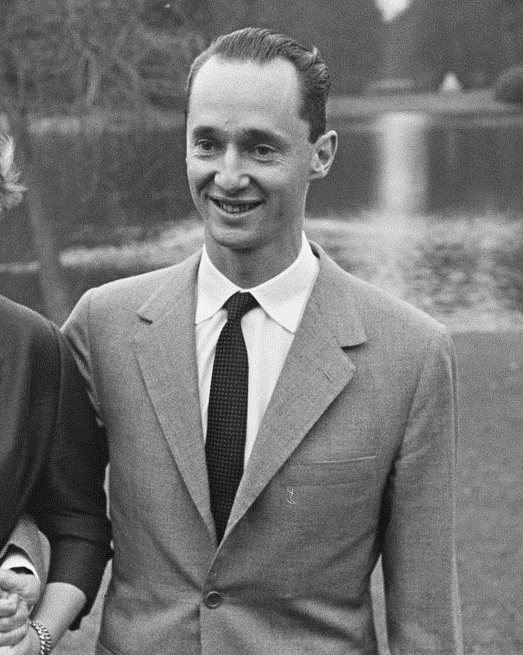
Carlos Hugo (1964)

In 1963 the showdown between Zamanillo-led Traditionalists and Massó-led Huguista was already in full swing. Ferrer threw his authority behind the latter and released a memorandum, charging Zamanillo and the review Siempre with mounting a pro-Juanista plot. Dubbing himself "the bellboy of Carlism" Ferrer noted he was happy to keep the door open for Zamanillo to leave, in aggressive and mocking tone lambasting also other dissidents like Sivatte or Cora. His stand might have tipped the balance; Zamanillo was expulsed and control of the party slipped to the Huguistas. Last years of Ferrer's life are marked by attempts to reinforce the position of Don Carlos Hugo. In 1964 he fathered a booklet intended to demonstrate the rights of Borbón-Parmas to Spanish citizenship, a document the prince had in hand when talking to Franco. Then he drafted analysis advancing their right to the Spanish throne; it was used during a grand Carlist gathering in 1965 in Puchheim, where Don Javier confirmed his royal claim. Ferrer himself was already unable to attend; he was rewarded by Orden de la Legitimidad Proscrita, a high Carlist honor awarded by the claimants.

== Historian ==
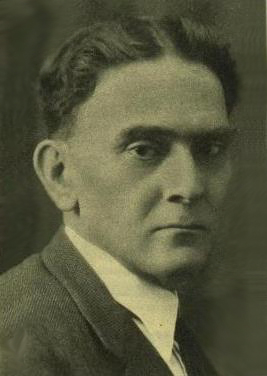
Domingo Tejera de Quesada

Ferrer was educated to be an engineer and his professional career is usually described as this of a periodista, though perhaps not a very successful one. He demonstrated no particular interest in history until in the mid-1930s he penned a few articles discussing the Carlist past, especially La dirección política de la Comunión Tradicionalista desde 1876. According to some authors already during his idle years in Jaén of the Civil War he started gathering materials for a general history of Carlism. According to others he acted on suggestion of Fal Conde, who in 1939 proposed that to maintain Carlist identity in wake of political amalgamation into one Francoist state party, a general history of Carlism was badly needed. One more group of scholars claim that Ferrer and his collaborators commenced their work to counter Historia de la guerra civil y de los partidos liberal y carlista by Antonio Pirala Criado, a 19th-century study which until 1939 was the only work serving as the overall history of the movement. In 1939 a former Carlist militant Roman Oyarzun published the first concise historiographic account of Carlism, Historia del Carlismo, yet his work was greeted with mixed feelings among the Carlists. Many considered Oyarzun's book an unorthodox attempt and were near to dismissing it altogether, still calling for sort of an "official" Carlist history.

In 1941 Ferrer and two other Seville-based authors, José F. Acedo Castilla and Domingo Tejera de Quesada, published in the local Editorial Católica Española the first volume of Historia del tradicionalismo español, intended as a general, in-depth history of Carlism. The team kept working on further volumes, though contribution of each of its members is difficult to gauge; Tejera died in 1944 yet all 11 volumes published until 1949 were attributed to all three authors. As Acedo left orthodox Carlism, starting volume XII Ferrer was named as the sole author. He managed to keep momentum and there were 18 volumes published in 15 years until 1956; during the following 5 years Ferrer completed subsequent 11 volumes, in 1960 releasing volume XXIX and bringing the narrative to the year of 1931.

Carlist standard

Ferrer kept working on consecutive volumes, yet he did not live to see them released. According to one author, the delay was caused by problems with censorship; eventually volume XXX, covering the period of 1931–1936, was edited posthumously by Enrique Roldán González and released in 1979, attributed to Ferrer only. In total Historia del tradicionalismo español amounts to around 9,300 pages; each volume includes some 50–150 pages of documental appendices and a bibliography. The series clearly focuses on military history; the First Carlist War is covered in 15 volumes and the Third Carlist War is treated in 4 volumes, while 32 years in-between both conflicts deserved just 5 volumes; 33 years of 1876–1909 are discussed in just 1 volume and 22 years of 1909–1931 in another. A concise version of the massive work was released by Ferrer in 1958 as Breve historia del legitimismo español.

== Theorist ==
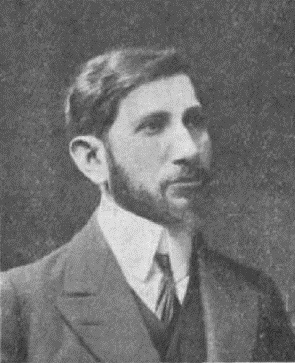
Charles Maurras

Compared to Ferrer's massive historiographic production his theoretical works seem minor and scarce; they amount to two booklets, Síntesis del programa de la Comunión Tradicionalista Española (1931) and Bases de la Representación (1942), apart from a handful of analytical articles scattered across Carlist periodicals of the 1930s and tens of contributions to daily press, especially those formatted as editorials to El Correo Español. They demonstrate that Ferrer nurtured a penchant for political theory, yet in history of Traditionalist thought he merits attention as perhaps the most eminent case of a Carlist thinker influenced by integral nationalism; the impact of L'Action Française is especially evident in Ferrer's earlier writings.

From his youth Ferrer remained impressed by writings of Charles Maurras; his decision to join the French army in 1914 is at times attributed to Ferrer's admiration for the Frenchman and his concepts. In general terms they prompted Ferrer to advocate renewal of Carlism; unlike many, he totally disregarded Vázquez de Mella and considered Traditionalism of the 1920s stuck in Romanticism, old esthetics and 19th-century schemes. His intention was to blend Traditionalism and modernity. Specifically, Ferrer tried to re-define the role of nation and state in the Carlist theoretical framework. Both concepts were usually neglected if not mistrusted by Carlist thinkers; Ferrer considered them crucial for modern outlook and strove to ensure their central position within the Traditionalist ideological toolset. Indeed, some scholars consider him the disciple of Domingo Cirici Ventalló and follower of his "españolismo Catalan". In terms of economy Ferrer acknowledged collapse of the Liberal order, challenged by social utopias on the one hand and technocratic estatismo on another; his own recipé was "reorganización corporativa".

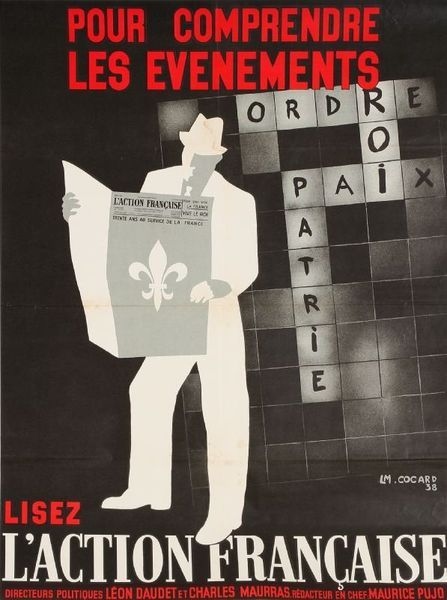
L'Action francaise poster

In the 1930s Ferrer followed Maurras diagnosing that France was trapped in permanent parliamentarian crisis, longing for a strong executive. He shared anti-parliamentarian stand of the Nazis yet deplored their ethnicity-based nationalism and drive for social engineering; Ferrer sympathized rather with Hugenberg. He preferred Italian Fascism, born out of fundamental opposition to the spirit of 1789, liberalism and individual rights and offering a syndical approach of concerting all social interests. However, he noted that armed with Traditionalism, Spain needed no foreign models; some see it as Ferrer's refusal to accept "física social" of Comtean positivism, forming the basics of Maurras’ integral nationalism. Admirer of L'Action Française, Ferrer despised its Spanish copy, Acción Española, and charged Carlists involved in the project, especially Pradera, with "tradicionalismo de corto alcance". Disdainful towards emerging Francoism, Ferrer thought it an anti-Traditionalist regime. In opposition to the new Cortes, considered born out of "origen revolucionario", he specified his own vision of representation. It was to be based on regional diets, each composed of 4 separate chambers and constructed in line with local tradition. They in turn were supposed to delegate members of the national diet;. its authority was to be limited to supra-regional issues like foreign affairs, army or money.

== Reception and legacy ==
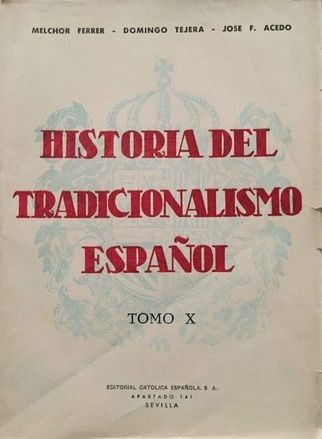

When in 1941 volume I of Historia went to print Ferrer was scarcely known beyond the realm of Catalan and Cantabrian Carlists; when in 1960 volume XXIX reached the market among the Carlists he was already the ultimate authority on the past; though there were controversies about treatment of particular episodes, the opus was accepted as sort of an "official" Carlist history. Among historians the reception of his work was mixed; massive scale of Ferrer's account earned respect, but especially the back matter raised many eyebrows. A fellow Carlist Jaime del Burgo judged harshly that Ferrer's approach to bibliography was excessively light and that he lacked sufficient source criticism; a strict inspection revealed glaring errors in documents quoted and another scholar identified 64 inaccuracies on just 4 pages of one of the appendices, in 1967 delivering a damning judgement that Historia was "a work with no scientific value".

Today the adjective accepted almost unanimously when describing Historia is "monumental". It reflects the scope and breadth of the work, which as a party history is perhaps unique globally; even the massive Soviet История Коммунистической партии Советского Союза pales in comparison. Apart from size, all other features are acknowledged in widely different terms. To some, Ferrer is "a Carlist Herodotus". According to an opinion repeated also in less definite wording, "no-one should dare to write a single line about Carlism without consulting Ferrer first" and indeed, one PhD dissertation quoted Ferrer no less than 164 times; almost every work on Carlist history prior to mid-20th century contains tens of similar references. More balanced comments praise Ferrer principally for exhaustive data provided; at times he is also commended for scientific rigor, combination of erudition and readability; vast documentary part, attractive writing style, personal familiarity with persons/issues and, last but not least, passion. Among the Carlists Ferrer is credited for offering an alternative to Liberal reading and clearing history of the movement from unjust imputations.

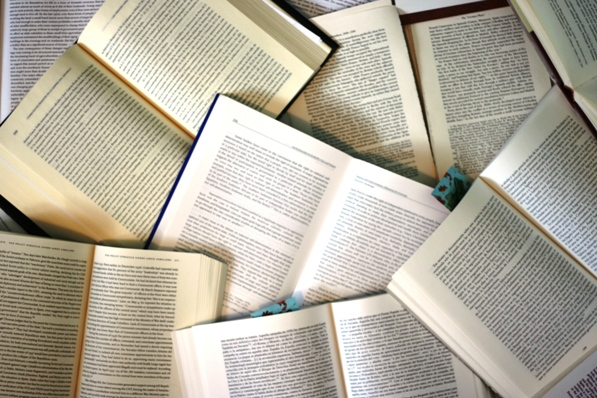

Carlist passion is also held against Ferrer, who is offered a dubious praise of "the greatest Carlist historian" or "probablamente el más importante de los historiadores carlistas", his work dubbed "la principal obra surgida de las filas carlistas". He is usually stigmatized as "traditionalist historian". All the above is a euphemism for bias, the allegation raised straightforwardly when Ferrer is charged with "sectarismo", presented as apologetic partisan, panegyric zealot, hagiographer or simply representative of "linea tradicionalista"; some critics reveal their own preferences when charging Ferrer with "parcialidad reaccionaria". Other faults attributed are poor command of sources, overfocus on military issues, scarce social background, poor integrity, overplaying personal issues and downplaying ideological differences, confusing and difficult to follow narrative, factual errors and distorted appendices. Some attribute merely "mediocre value" to the series, some are more severe and either note that Historia should be eliminated from bibliographies or refer to Ferrer as "historiador" in quotation marks. Some settle for conclusion that despite "enormous criticism received" the work remains obligatory lecture for any student of Carlism, fundamental and "la obra de referencia".

== See also ==
- Traditionalism (Spain)
- Carlism
- Augusto Ferrer-Dalmau
