= Teixeira =

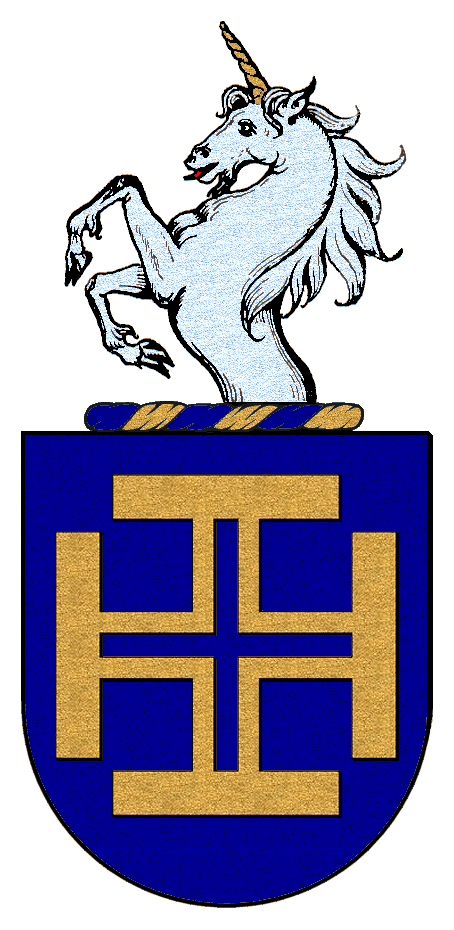
- Teixeira original coat of arms.
- Pronunciation: European Portuguese: [tɐjˈʃɐjɾɐ] Galician: [tejˈʃejɾɐ]
- Language: Portuguese, Galician

Origin
- Meaning: Place of the yew trees
- Region of origin: Iberian Peninsula

Teixeira (European Portuguese: [tɐjˈʃɐjɾɐ], Galician: [tejˈʃejɾɐ]) is a Galician-Portuguese surname based on the toponym Teixeira, derived from teixo "yew tree" (Latin taxus). The progenitors of the name were a "Noble Portuguese Marrano family, originally bearing the surname of Sampayo," and the Teixeira coat of arms was conferred "in accordance with a decree of King Philip IV of Spain" in 1643. A less frequent variant spelling is Texeira. The variant Técher is common in the highlands of Reunion Island, notably in the Cilaos area.

Notable people with the surname include:

== Historical ==
- Tristão Vaz Teixeira (1395–1480), Portuguese navigator and explorer
- Luís Teixeira (16th century), Portuguese Jesuit cartographer, mathematician and humanist
- Bento Teixeira (1560–1618), Portuguese writer
- Pedro Teixeira Albernaz (1595–1662), Portuguese cartographer
- Pedro Teixeira (died 1640), Portuguese explorer
- António Teixeira (composer) (1707–1769), Portuguese composer
- Antônio Gonçalves Teixeira e Souza (1812–1861), Brazilian author
- Alexander Teixeira de Mattos (1865–1921), Dutch-English journalist, literary critic and publisher, and translator

== Politicians ==
- António Teixeira de Sousa (1857–1917), Portuguese medical doctor and politician
- Constantino Teixeira, Guinea-Bissau politician
- Fernando Teixeira dos Santos (born 1951), Portuguese politician
- Humberto Cavalcanti de Albuquerque Teixeira (1915–1979), Brazilian lawyer, politician, musician, and composer
- José Roberto Magalhães Teixeira (1937–1996), Brazilian politician
- Manuel Teixeira Gomes (1860–1941), Portuguese politician
- Miro Teixeira (born 1945), Brazilian politician and journalist
- Nuno Severiano Teixeira (born 1957), Portuguese politician
- Osmar Teixeira (born 1998), Brazilian politician
- Paulo Teixeira (politician) (born 1961), Brazilian politician, lawyer, and professor

== Sports ==
- Alex Teixeira Santos (born 1990), Brazilian footballer
- Armando Gonçalves Teixeira (born 1976), known as Petit, Portuguese footballer
- Dimas Teixeira (born 1969), Portuguese footballer
- Dionatan Teixeira (1992–2017), Brazilian-born Slovak footballer
- Filipe Teixeira (born 1980), Portuguese footballer
- Glover Teixeira (born 1979), Brazilian mixed martial artist
- Humberlito Borges Teixeira (born 1980), Brazilian football player
- João Carlos Teixeira (born 1993), Portuguese football player
- João Miguel da Cunha Teixeira, Portuguese footballer
- José Batlle Perdomo Teixeira (born 1965), Uruguayan footballer
- Juarez Teixeira (1928–2026), Brazilian footballer
- Júlio César Teixeira, (born 1979) known as Julinho, Brazilian footballer
- Mark Teixeira (born 1980), American baseball player
- Pedro Teixeira (born 1998), Swiss footballer
- Renan Teixeira da Silva (born 1985), Brazilian footballer
- Ricardo Terra Teixeira (born 1947), former president of the Brazilian Football Confederation (CBF)
- Ricardo Teixeira (born 1982), Angolan racing driver
- Rodrigo Teixeira (born 1978), Brazilian footballer
- Tallison Teixeira (born 1999), Brazilian mixed martial artist
- Virgilio Teixeira (born 1973), Dutch footballer
- Wilson Teixeira Beraldo (1917–1998), Brazilian physician and physiologist

== Other people ==
- Anísio Teixeira (1900–1971), Brazilian educator, jurist, and writer
- Anya Teixeira (1913–1992), British photographer and photojournalist
- Armando Teixeira (born 1968), Portuguese musician
- Carlos Teixeira (born 1976), Portuguese volleyball player
- Eduardo Teixeira Coelho (1919–2005), Portuguese comic book artist
- Fernando Teixeira, American engineer
- Francisco Gomes Teixeira, Portuguese mathematician and historian of mathematics
- Gonçalo Teixeira (disambiguation), several people
- Heloísa Teixeira (1939–2025), Brazilian writer, essayist, editor and literary critic
- Henrique Teixeira de Sousa (1919–2006), Cape Verdean doctor and author
- Jack Teixeira (born 2001), American air national guardsman accused of being responsible for 2023 Pentagon document leaks
- Marlon Teixeira, Brazilian model
- Moises Teixeira da Silva, Brazilian criminal
- Ruy Teixeira, American political scientist
- Thalissa Teixeira, British-Brazilian actress
- Urano Teixeira da Matta Bacellar (1947–2006), Brazilian military officer
- Virgílio Teixeira (1917–2010), Portuguese film, television and stage actor

== See also ==
- Tejera, the Spanish-language version
- Tissera, Sinhala-language version
