= Teixeira (disambiguation) =

Teixeira is a Portuguese-language surname.

Teixeira may also refer to:

== Places ==
- Teixeira (Seia), Portugal
- Teixeira, Paraíba, Brazil
- Teixeira de Freitas, State of Bahia, Brazil
- Teixeira Soares, Paraná, Brazil

== See also ==
- A Teixeira, a municipality in Ourense, Galicia, Spain
- Teixeira Duarte, a Portuguese business conglomerate
- Teixeira planisphere, a 1573 map by Domingos Teixeira
- Teixeiranthus, a genus of Brazilian plants
- Teixeiras, a municipality in Minas Gerais, Brazil
- Teixeirão stadium, São José do Rio Preto, São Paulo State, Brazil
