= Tissera =

Tissera is a Sinhalese surname derived from the Portuguese Teixeira. It may refer to the following notable people:

- Dayasritha Tissera, Sri Lankan politician
- Matías Tissera (born 1996), Argentine football forward
- Michael Tissera (born 1939), Sri Lankan cricketer
  - Sobers–Tissera Trophy
- Rob Tissera (born 1966), British DJ and record producer
- Protus Tissera (1925–2007), Sri Lankan politician
