= Paula Cândido =

Municipality in Minas Gerais, Brazil

Coordinates: 20°53′S 42°58′W

- Municipality
- Interactive map of Paula Cândido
- Country: Brazil
- State: Minas Gerais
- Region: Southeast
- Time zone: UTC−3 (BRT)

Location of Paula Cândido within Minas Gerais

Paula Cândido is a municipality in the state of Minas Gerais, Brazil. The city belongs to the mesoregion of Zona da Mata and to the microregion of Viçosa. As of 2020, the estimated population was 9,584.

== See also ==
- List of municipalities in Minas Gerais
