= Domingo Tejera de Quesada =

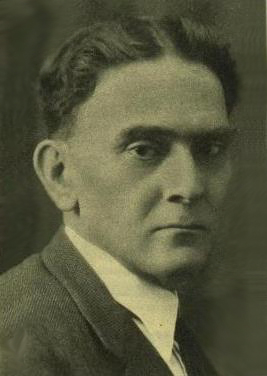
- Born: Domingo Tejera de Quesada; 1881; Las Palmas, Spain
- Died: 1944 (aged 62–63); Seville, Spain
- Occupation: journalist
- Known for: publisher
- Political party: Carlism

Domingo Tejera de Quesada (1881–1944) was a Spanish publisher. In 1911 to 1913 he managed a Madrid illustrated review Nuevo Mundo, in 1922 to1939 a Seville-based daily La Unión, and during short spells also other minor periodicals. During his career he contributed to numerous other newspapers, and gained recognition as the 1914 to 1917 war correspondent of ABC. Politically he initially sided with the Maurista faction of the Conservatives, but later he adopted a Traditionalist posture and became one of the most vehement Carlist propagandists. His political climax fell on the period of 1933 to 1936, when he served within the Carlist minority in the Cortes.

== Family and youth ==
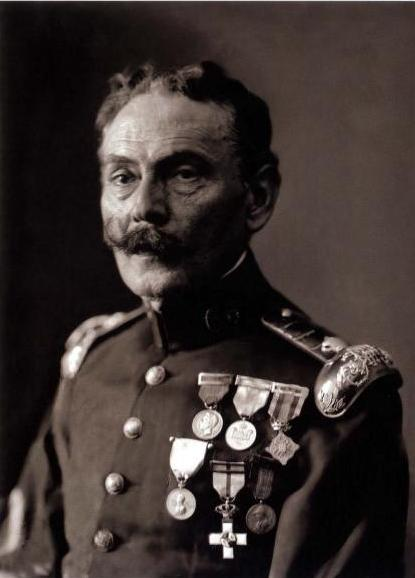
father

The Tejeras originated from Northern Spain. One branch settled in the Canary Islands, though distant ancestors of Domingo are unknown. His grandfather Santiago Tejera married Dominica Ossavarry, granddaughter to a painter José Ossavarry; he perished mid-aged during the cholera epidemics in the 1850s. Social standing of the widow was modest and their oldest son, Santiago Tejera Ossavarry (1852-1936), was initially educated in a seminary. Aged 17 he opted for military career and became “músico militár”. He served on the peninsula but eventually returned to his native island and until retirement in 1914 he directed a local military band. Tejera Ossavarry was well known in Las Palmas, first because every Thursday his band entertained the city dwellers, and then because as retiree he worked as an organist by the cathedral. Apart from briefly editing a humoristic bulletin he composed music; some of his zarzuelas are played until today. In advanced years he was reduced to poverty; the ayuntamiento purchased rights to his works and kept paying him extra pension.

Tejera Ossavarry married María Quesada Déniz (died 1920), daughter to a local Canarian family. The family had at least 3 children, all of them boys. The oldest one, Santiago Tejera Quesada, gained some recognition locally as a painter but he died prematurely mid-aged in 1916; the youngest brother perished in 1931. Domingo was raised in atmosphere marked by cultural heritage of the Ossavarries, literary and musical endeavors of his father, publishing business of the Quesada family and early painting achievements of his older brother. It is known that from his childhood he tried his hands in letters, yet his exact early education is not clear. At some point he moved to Madrid and entered Facultad de Derecho at Universidad Central; he was last recorded as a student in 1906, though it is not confirmed that he graduated. At the time he already commenced co-operation with numerous periodicals and entered the editorial board of a popular Madrid review Nuevo Mundo; as its correspondent he already travelled to Cuba.

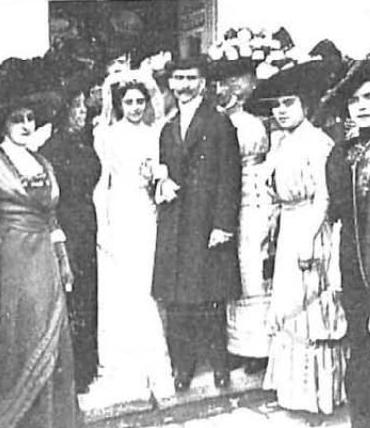
Tejera's wedding, 1910

In 1910 Tejera married a girl from Madrid, Emilia García Nogales, the niece of a writer José Nogales. The marriage barely endured a year. His wife developed grave health problems and in 1911 she died; the couple had no issue. In 1917 Tejera remarried with Teresa Arroyo Mateo; nothing closer is known about her or her family. The couple had many children, born between the late 1910s and the early 1930s. None of them became a public figure. At least 4 of them entered religious orders; Manuel Tejera Arroyo was Rector del Colegio Máximo de la Compañía de Jesús in Seville. Santiago Tejera Arroyo sided with Carlists; he served under colonel Redondo as requeté during the war, was moderately active in the post-war years and declared Don Juan the legitimate heir to the throne in the late 1950s. He was best known, however, as manager of the Seville-based football club Real Betis.

== Early career (1907-1918) ==
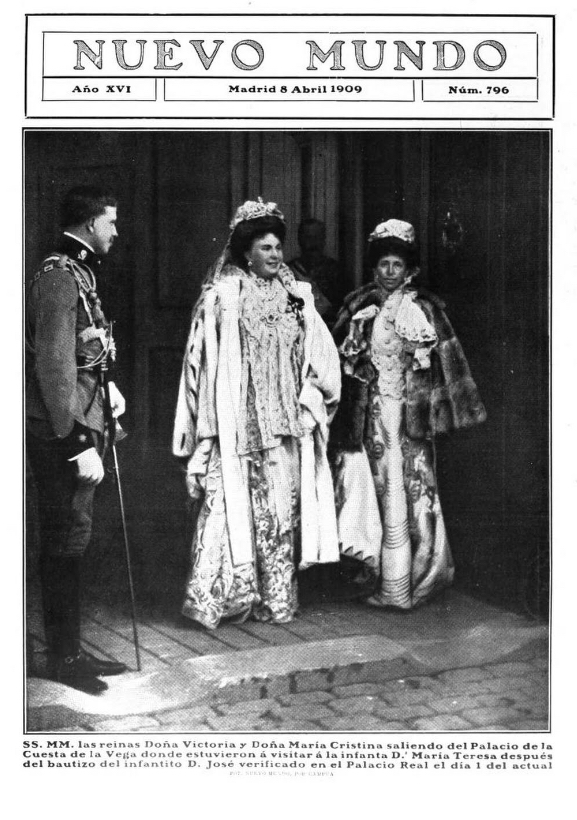
Nuevo Mundo front page

In his mid-20s Tejera entered the circle of José Perojo, a conservative politician elected to the parliament from the Canaries; one scholar describes him as “lugarteniente de Perojo”. Perojo was co-owner of Nuevo Mundo, a modern Madrid-based magazine; in 1906 Tejera, known merely for few poems and single contributions to local dailies, started to publish in a weekly add-on Por Esos Mundos, and the same year he entered the editorial board of Nuevo Mundo. Since 1907 he started to publish his own pieces, and in 1909 he again travelled as its correspondent to Cuba. Following death of Perojo the magazine underwent changes in ownership; though related to the previous owner, Tejera declared himself happy also under the new one. In 1911 he was nominated the new editor-in-chief of Nuevo Mundo; initially his appointment was something of a stopgap measure, but it turned out to be more than provisional. Tejera managed the review for some 2 years; in 1913 and in circumstances which remain unclear, he resigned.

Following outbreak of World War I Tejera started to co-operate with a Madrid daily ABC; between 1914 and 1917 he published 82 articles which traced wartime developments. He published under the pen-name of “R. Schneider” and his correspondence demonstrated a hardly veiled pro-German and pro-Austrian bias; apart from ongoing analysis which usually underlined arguments in favor of the Central Powers, he claimed that outbreak of the war was triggered by Russia, which sought domination in the Balkans. One of his opponents – probably aware of identity of the author – noted that “R. Schneider piensa y discute como un auténtico aleman”. He contributed war correspondence also to other periodicals; in 1915 Tejera published in Ilustración Española y Americana, and after 1917 especially in La Acción, where he wrote many first-page editorials. At times Tejera published also in El Bien Público, La Gaceta de Tenerife, La Independencia, La Cruz and other newspapers.

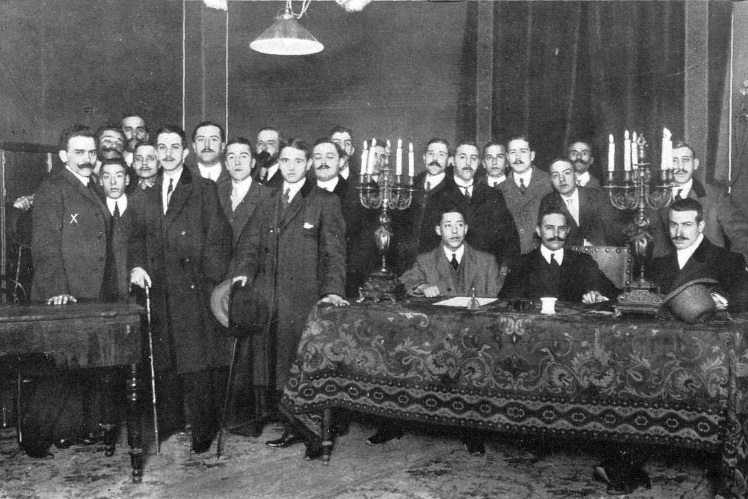
Tejera (1fL) among members of Juventud Conservadora, 1910s

In the entourage of Perojo Tejera approached the right-wing faction of the conservative party, headed by Antonio Maura. In the early 1910s he stepped up engagement in political structures, both in the Canary Islands and in Madrid, e.g. giving lectures in local circles of Juventud Conservadora. He gained some recognition as vehement participant in debate over would-be division of the Canary Islands into two provinces; in numerous publications he opposed the plan and hailed Gran Canaria over Tenerife. In 1914-1915 he emerged as one of the leaders of the Madrid maurista youth and even in 1917 he animated Juventud Maurista. In 1918 he was building a maurista party in the islands; nationwide he was to head Sección de Prensa of Acción Maurista. Prior to the 1918 elections he was marked as a Canarian candidate to the Cortes supported by the alliance of leonistas and mauristas; eventually the negotiations broke down, he stood as independent and lost miserably. He supported a maurista candidate during the following campaign, but despite his efforts the Maura following in the Canarias was in decay.

== Experienced journalist (1918-1931) ==
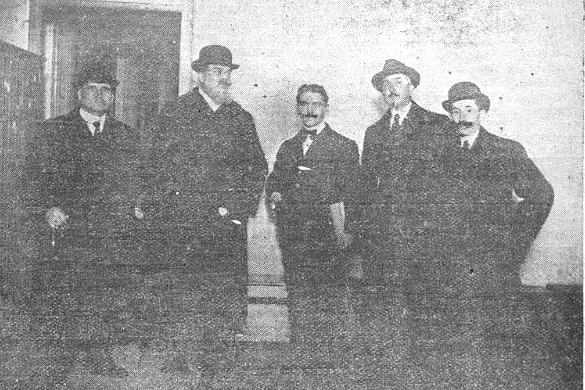
Tejera (centre) in Centro Maurista, late Restoration period

In 1918 Tejera became the director of a Madrid daily El Día. According to one source he ceased in mid-1919, but another source indicates that in 1922 he was subject to a lawsuit, resulting from El Día’s abusive publication on judicial system. In 1919 Tejera commenced co-operation with El Debate, a Madrid daily set up as a modern Catholic newspaper tailored in line with the ACNP strategy. During the 1919-1920 period he edited a column which followed parliamentary developments. In 1920 he moved from Madrid to Seville to assume management of similarly formatted provincial newspaper, El Correo de Andalucia, the daily partially controlled by the local archbishop. Formally Tejera headed the paper until 1923. He was also involved in an obscure cinema venture; in 1921 movie theatres advertised a 5-part series titled Las arañas negras, allegedly based on a novel by “R. Schneider”; no details are known.

In 1922 Tejera assumed management of another Seville daily, La Unión. The newspaper was controlled by entrepreneurs grouped around the local Unión Comercial and remained only moderately successful. Tejera embarked on a modernization program and in the mid-1920s he participated in the group's propagandistic endeavors. It is not known what was La Unión’s position towards the Primo de Rivera coup. However, Tejera's relations with the military were sour; in 1926 Consejo de Guerra claimed that he insulted the military when discussing the Morocco campaign and filed a lawsuit. In the mid-1920s also the corporative press association in Seville felt offended by Tejera's intransigent publications; he was eventually relegated from Asociación de la Prensa de Sevilla. In spite of it, in 1927 he attended a Madrid-based Congreso de la Prensa and delivered a lecture. Approaching 50 he started to suffer from health problems yet it seems they did not affect his professional performance. He still felt a Canarian and kept promoting the islands on various fields.

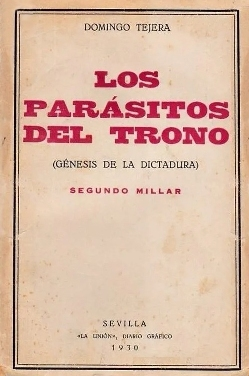
Los Parásitos del Trono

In 1930 Tejera published a 360-page book, titled Los parásitos del trono; it traced developments of Spanish politics between 1907 and 1923. The volume formed part of a public debate, launched during dictablanda and aimed at discussing the shape of political regime after the fall of Primo. Los parasitos contained an onslaught against the party system. Tejera charged almost all politicians of late Restoration of ruining national politics with partisan squabbles and claimed that the constitution of 1876, which allowed this, was no longer operational. The book was a firm monarchist pronouncement; Tejera lamented that due to constitutional limitations Alfonso XIII was unable to prevent political deterioration and called to build the future system on strong executive, possibly based on broadened royal prerogatives. The volume was widely discussed in the press. In October 1930, when the king visited Seville, Tejera welcomed him on behalf of local business, though one scholar claims that the encounter was not related to national politics and Tejera merely advanced specific economic interests of some Andalusian entrepreneurs.

== Anti-Republican crusader (1931-1936) ==
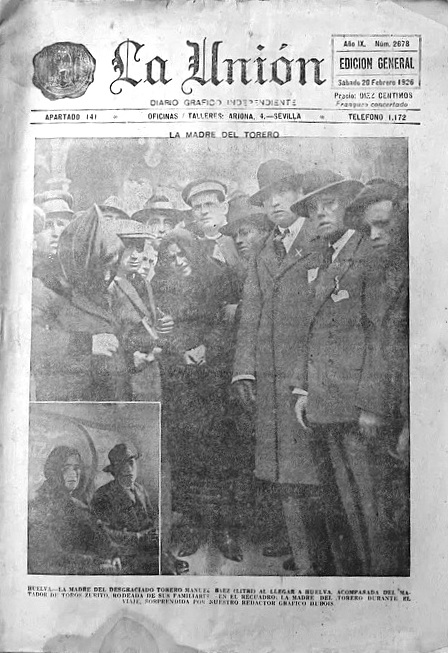
La Unión

Declaration of the Republic produced rapid radicalization of La Unión. The daily assumed a militant stand aimed against champions of republican legislation; they were charged with pursuit of masonic and secular interests against the Spanish national tradition. In late 1931 Tejera was assaulted on the street by a relative of Diego Martínez Barrio, who as leader of the freemasonry was particular target of La Unión’s ire. During the 24-hour takeover of Seville by Sanjurjo, La Unión’s editorial read that “Spain has need of all her sons and issues this day a call to provide the nation with healthier institutions”. This stand cost the daily suspension. In the atmosphere of massive political mobilization La Unión gained popularity, with the print run of some 5,000 copies. In late 1932 the company launched a Cádiz daily La Información and took control of Diario de Jeréz; Tejera for some time ceased at La Unión to assume managerial role in La Información; all 3 papers co-operated closely.

Some scholars maintain that in the early 1930s Tejera approached the accidentalist Acción Nacional. Others claim that he turned towards Integrism. Last but not least, starting mid-1933 in the press he was referred against the background of “tradicionalistas sevillanos”. During the electoral campaign of late 1933 Tejera was fielded as a candidate on the Seville right-wing coalition list. Initially he appeared as an independent, later on he was presented in the press as a traditionalist, though still an independent one. The campaign proved extremely conflictive; Tejera's car was once pelted with stones, and at another opportunity he was detained on charge of illicit possession of firearms. Eventually Tejera was comfortably elected; though courted by the AP, he wired the Carlist leader Rodezno a message of adhesion: “quiero sentarme junto a Vd. debajo del reloj a esperar la hora que no debe de tardar”.

Carlist standard

Starting late 1933 Tejera was clearly associated with the Carlists. His interventions in the parliament were sporadic; he focused rather on propaganda. La Unión embarked on particularly belligerent course; it emerged as the most-repressed daily in Spain. Tejera was subject to 63 lawsuits, the premises were many times assaulted and until mid-1934 combined fines totaled 20,000 ptas; the press kept publishing information on new administrative measures. La Unión was getting increasingly explicit. Tejera took part in Carlist rallies in Andalusia and in the Canaries; in 1934 he was nominated the party jefé in the islands. The same year he entered Consejo de Cultura, a body designed as guardian of Carlist ideological purity. In his role of a pundit he published few pieces in the Carlist intellectual monthly Tradición; he also launched a new party periodical in Las Palmas and became its director Dubbed by scholars “Carlists’ chief masonophobe” he also kept warning against Jewish influence; gradually his rantings “took on a more disturbingly contemporary tinge”. However, he demonstrated also some unorthodox features, like a grade of sympathy towards the anarchists and moderation when it came to lambasting Azaña.

== Enthusiast and dissident (1936-1944) ==
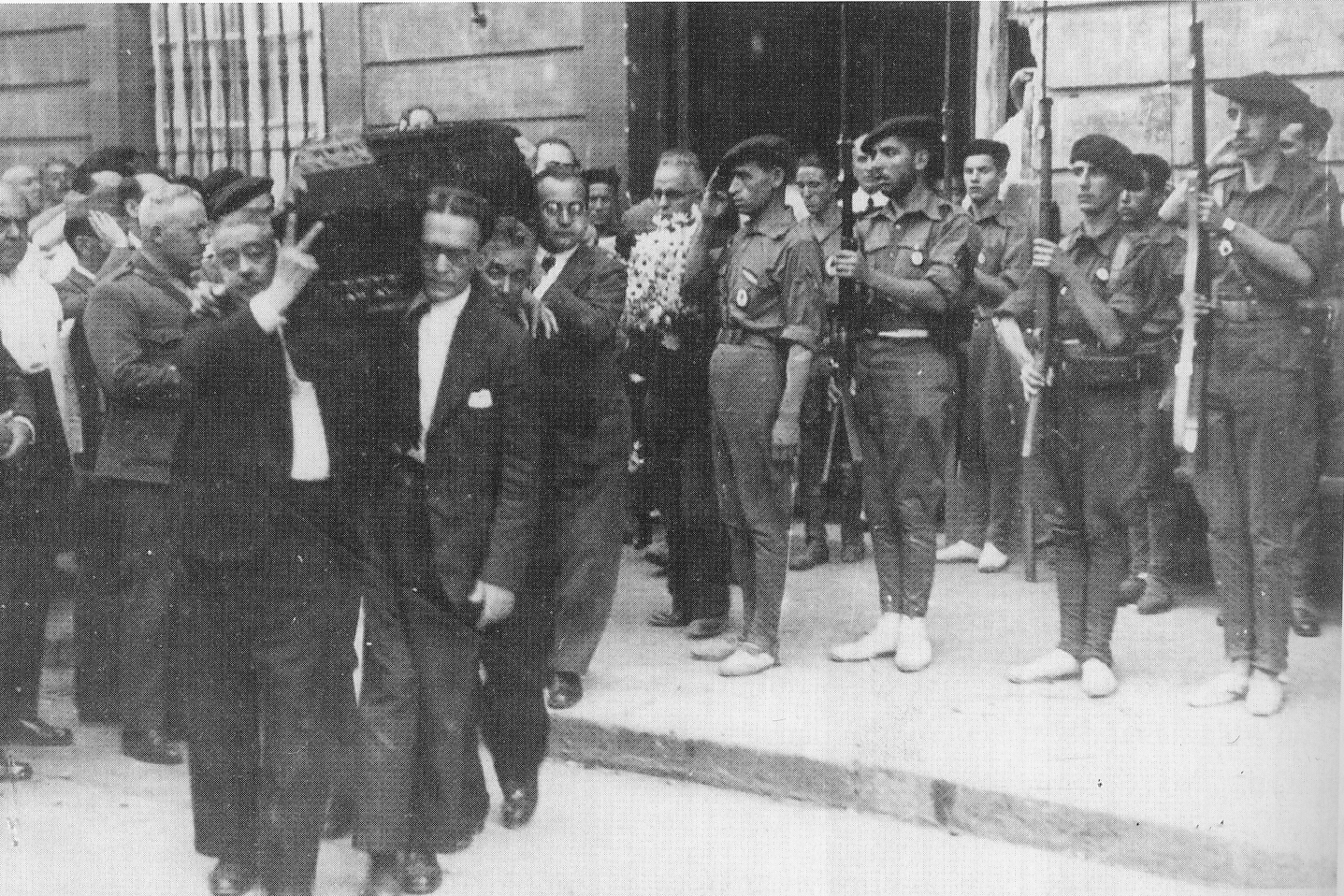
Tejera (2fL) at a requeté funeral

Tejera was engaged in Carlist anti-Republican conspiracy of 1936. The party executive was divided into those who opted for a Carlist-only rising and those who remained skeptical, leaning rather towards joining a coup organized by the military; Tejera counted among the latter. After Seville had been seized by the rebels at unspecified time - though prior to mid-September - he ceded management of La Unión and as a 55-year-old he joined the party militia requeté; he was assigned to the Andalusian battalion named Tercio Virgen de los Reyes. In October he was lightly wounded during fighting in the Córdoba province and returned for treatment to Seville, already in the requeté rank of a capitán. His whereabouts during the winter are not clear; in December 1936 he claimed he intended to return into line.

In early months of 1937 Tejera took part in internal party debates related to threat of forthcoming amalgamation into a state party. Concerned about the military pressure, he opposed any negotiations about would-be merger with Falange unless future Spain were clearly declared a traditionalist monarchy; he found himself in minority. Following forced unification Tejera did not participate in buildup of FET and was noted as taking part in Carlist-only events, like funerals of fallen requeté. La Unión, formally owned by a private company, was not absorbed into the unificated Falangist propaganda machinery, yet it faced increased administrative pressure; the 1938-adopted Ley de Prensa was intended to drive independent periodicals out of the market. Tejera was increasingly viewed by military authorities as an intransigent and dissentious skeptic; to save La Unión he resigned and formally ceded its management to a fellow Carlist Melchor Ferrer. The plan did not work. In 1939 Tejera was subject to official investigation about spreading “noticias alarmantes”, and La Unión was forced to close on December 31, 1939.

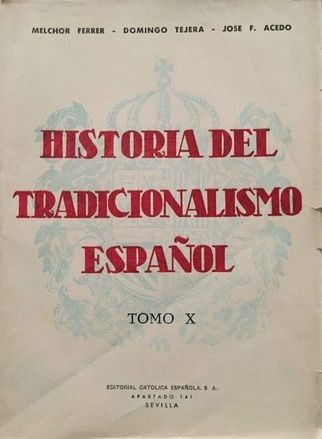

As a dissenting Carlist who refused to engage in buildup of the national-syndicalist regime, since 1940 Tejera was subject to various administrative repressive measures; they climaxed in a 3-month-long arrest of 1941, possibly for confronting the Falangist tycoon, Pedro Gamero del Castilo. Unable to publish in the press, in the early 1940s Tejera formed a historiographic team with Ferrer and another Seville-based Carlist author, José F. Acedo Castilla; they embarked on the task of producing sort of an official, detailed, party-endorsed history of Carlism. The project was envisioned on massive scale and materialised as a multi-volume series titled Historia del tradicionalismo español; until Tejera's death there were 6 volumes published. Exact role of all 3 co-authors is not clear. Tejera was the oldest and the most experienced of them yet usually it is Ferrer considered the key contributor, while Tejera and Acedo are occasionally dubbed as his mere “collaborators”; also, all editions listed Ferrer first, Tejera second and Acedo third. Tejera died due to bronchopneumonia, but further 5 volumes published after his death until 1948 were attributed to all three authors.

== See also ==
- Carlism
- Traditionalism (Spain)
