= Coimbra, Minas Gerais =

Brazilian municipality in the state of Minas Gerais

Coordinates: 20°51′25″S 42°48′10″W

- Municipality
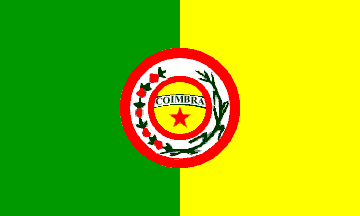
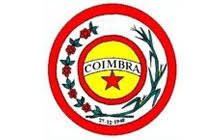
- Flag Coat of arms
- Interactive map of Coimbra, Minas Gerais
- Country: Brazil
- State: Minas Gerais
- Region: Southeast
- Time zone: UTC−3 (BRT)

Location of Coimbra within Minas Gerais

Coimbra is a Brazilian municipality located in the state of Minas Gerais. The city belongs to the mesoregion of Zona da Mata and to the microregion of Viçosa. It is named after Coimbra, Portugal. As of 2020, the estimated population was 7,594.

== See also ==
- List of municipalities in Minas Gerais
