= Pedra do Anta =

Brazilian municipality located in the state of Minas Gerais

Coordinates: 20°36′S 42°43′W

- Municipality
- Interactive map of Pedra do Anta
- Country: Brazil
- State: Minas Gerais
- Region: Southeast
- Time zone: UTC−3 (BRT)

Location of Pedra do Anta within Minas Gerais

Pedra do Anta is a Brazilian municipality located in the state of Minas Gerais. The city belongs to the mesoregion of Zona da Mata and to the microregion of Viçosa. As of 2020, the estimated population was 3,005.

== See also ==
- List of municipalities in Minas Gerais
