= Presidente Bernardes, Minas Gerais =

Presidente Bernardes
- Municipality
- Location in Minas Gerais state

- Location in Brazil
- Coordinates: 20°46′8″S 43°11′16″W
- Country: Brazil
- Region: Southeast
- State: Minas Gerais

Area
  - Total: 237 km^{2} (92 sq mi)

Population (2020)
  - Total: 5,341
  - Density: 22.5/km^{2} (58.4/sq mi)
- Time zone: UTC−3 (BRT)

Presidente Bernardes is a municipality in the state of Minas Gerais in Brazil. The population is 5,341 (2020 est.) in an area of 237 km^{2}. The elevation is 591 m. Presidente Bernardes is named after President Artur Bernardes.

== See also ==
- List of municipalities in Minas Gerais
