= Teixeiras =

Town in Minas Gerais, Brazil

Coordinates: 20°39′S 42°51′W

- Municipality
- Interactive map of Teixeiras
- Country: Brazil
- State: Minas Gerais
- Region: Southeast
- Time zone: UTC−3 (BRT)

Location of Teixeiras within Minas Gerais

Teixeiras is a Brazilian municipality located in the state of Minas Gerais. The city belongs to the mesoregion of Zona da Mata and to the microregion of Viçosa. As of 2020, the estimated population was 11,670.

== See also ==
- List of municipalities in Minas Gerais
