= Sampayo =

Sampayo is a surname. Notable people with the surname include:

- Ben Sampayo (born 1992), British footballer
- Carlos Sampayo (born 1943), Argentine writer
- Ramón Sampayo Ortiz (born 1957), Mexican politician
- Thomas Edward de Sampayo (1855-1927), Puisne Justice of the Supreme Court of Sri Lanka
