= Carlism in literature =

Carlist standard

On March 21, 1890, at a conference dedicated to the siege of Bilbao during the Third Carlist War, Miguel de Unamuno delivered a lecture titled La última guerra carlista como materia poética. It was probably the first-ever attempt to examine the Carlist motive in literature, as for the previous 57 years the subject had been increasingly present in poetry, drama and novel. However, it remains paradoxical that when Unamuno was offering his analysis, the period of great Carlist role in letters was just about to begin. It lasted for some quarter of a century, as until the late 1910s Carlism remained a key theme of numerous monumental works of Spanish literature. Afterward, it lost its appeal as a literary motive, still later reduced to instrumental role during Francoism. Today it enjoys some popularity, though no longer as catalyst of paramount cultural or political discourse; its role is mostly to provide exotic, historical, romantic, and sometimes mysterious setting.

== Romanticism ==
The First Carlist War broke out when Spanish Romanticism was in its heyday. The literary response to the conflict was immediate and massive; its key features were propagandistic objectives of both sides and often close follow-up to the events as they were unfolding. Two genres serving as key literary battlefields were poetry and drama, the most adapt ones in terms of responsiveness. On both the Cristinos gained immediate advantage, which in the aftermath of the war became visible also in prose, especially in the nascent novel. On the other hand, the popular oral rural response, which made it to literature once written down in the future, was predominantly pro-Carlist. No Romantic work touching upon the Carlist subject is considered part of the great Spanish literature.

=== Drama ===
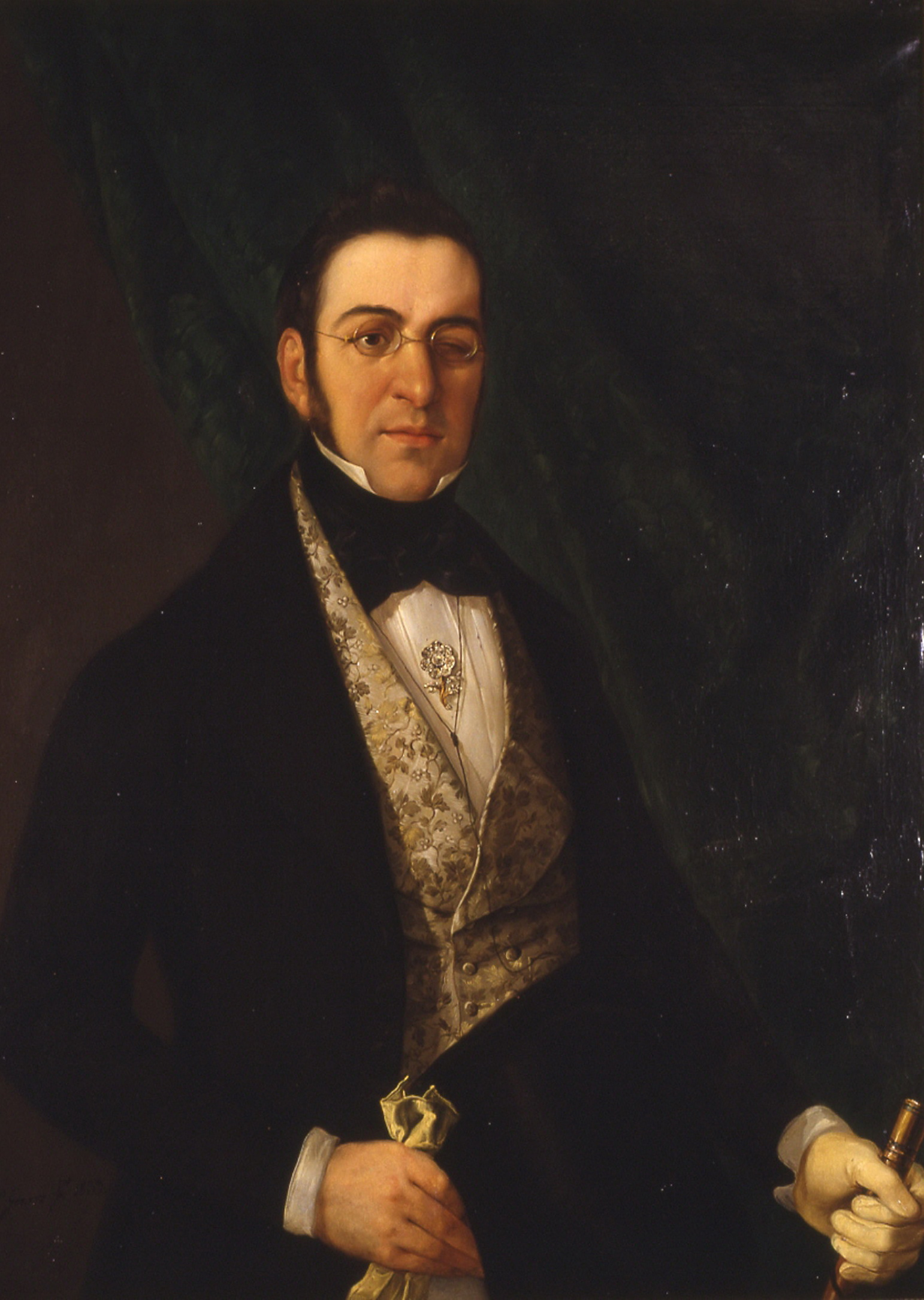
Bretón de los Herreros

The 1833 outbreak of the First Carlist War, usually considered the birth moment of Carlism, has almost immediately triggered a literary response. The literary genre which responded first was drama. There were a number of theatrical pieces written as the war was unfolding and it seems that most of them were actually staged, as they served mostly propagandistic purpose of mobilizing support; only few were rather comments to recent or even ongoing events. Anti-Carlism clearly prevailed, a phenomenon obviously linked to Cristinos controlling almost all the urban zones, centers of cultural and theatrical life. Most of the dramas seem to be short, one-act pieces, characterized by strong message and boldly sketched protagonists. Unlike in case of poetry, there is no anthology available. It seems that the anti-Carlist dramas fall into two categories: satiric pieces closely related to recent or ongoing events and dramas in historical setting, advancing a general Liberal outlook and in particular aimed against Inquisition and the Absolutist formula.

Among the writers excelling as authors of satires the one re-appearing in numerous works as the most prominent one is Jose Robreño y Tort. He made his name as author of theatrical pieces already in the mid-1820s; venomous caricatures of "los serviles", e.g. La Regencia de la Seo de Urgell o las desgracias del padre Liborio (1822) might be considered pre-configuration of his later anti-Carlist dramas and perhaps the first pieces of anti-Carlist literature. Robreño's brief works written during the conflict were again intended for popular audience and are known to have been played in Barcelona in the 1830s. Another Liberal author of the same genre is Manuel Bretón de los Herreros, recognized for the anti-Carlist comedy El plan de un drama (1835). Among the dramas set in history there is El trovador by Antonio García Gutiérrez (1836), Antonio Pérez y Felipe II by José Muñoz Maldonado (1837), Doña Mencia by Juan Eugenio Hartzenbusch (1838) and Carlos II el Hechizado by Antonio Gil y Zárate (1837); especially the last one was a success among the public. The Carlist response is little known; it seems that Carlist values were defended generally "por el teatro conservador católico". The best known author of this breed is José Vicente Alvarez Perera, high Carlist official during the war and also a poet, author of Calendario del año de 1823 and Palabras de un cristiano. José Zorilla was sympathetic to Carlism and even briefly stayed at the Carlist court, yet in his theatrical pieces he did not touch upon the issue.

=== Poetry ===
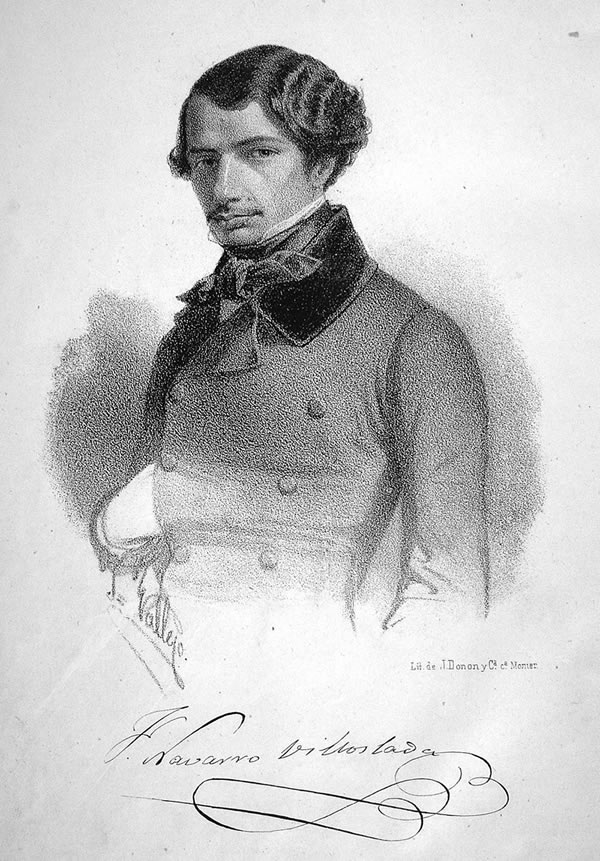
Navarro Villoslada

The poets responded to the conflict almost as fast as authors of theatrical pieces did. The conflict and its immediate aftermath produced a spate of rhymed pieces, usually first published in press titles of the era. Alfonso Bullón de Mendoza, who attempted to gather them together but limited his work to authors contemporary to the warfare, arrived at a total of 110 works. Being a historian but not a historian of literature, he refrains from offering philological comment, be it in terms of evaluating quality or discussing style; however, it seems that most items were written with clear propagandistic intentions in mind and that none of them made it to the annals of Spanish poetry. This vast assortment so far can be analyzed mostly in statistical terms; in terms of genre the poetry remains pretty differentiated, with odes, sonnets, eposes, lyrics, cantos, canciones, anthems, marches, satire and other. In terms of key themes, the ones listed are: military buildup, wartime actions, peace accord, foreign intervention, ideology, personalities, enemy and wartime love. Some of the items were re-printed in anthologies or personal poetic volumes in the 1840s and 1850s. Following the war victory of Cristinos and then following the coronation of Isabella II a flow of court poetry continued for two decades; in endless volumes various authors used to pay homage first to the regent Maria Christina and then to the queen and at times made references to peace and prosperity, which reigned thanks to triumph over the Carlists.

Some of the works identified remain anonymous, yet most are attributable; their authors include José de Espronceda – who fathered a militantly anti-Carlist poem Guerra (1835), concluded with "death to the Carlists!" cry, Juan Arolas, Marcial Busquets, Ramón de Campoamor, Lorenzo de Hernandorena, José Marti Folguera, Alberto Lista, Antonio Martínez, Juan Martínez Villergas, Valentin Mazo Correa, Francisco Navarro Villoslada, Emilio Olloqui, Antonio Ribot y Fontsere, Josep Robreno, Manuel de Toro, Niceto de Zamacois and Francisco Zea. Statistically pro-Cristinos seem to prevail, and their poetic zeal reached as far as to Andalusia, a region less affected by the First Carlist War. Some wartime episodes drew particular attention: the so-called Abrazo de Vergara attracted at least 5 works, by Jose Vicente Echegaray (1839), Juan Nicasio Gallego (1850), Marcial Busquets (1858) Martí Folguera (1869) and Emilio Olloqui (1869), while battle of Luchana was acknowledged by Antonio Martínez (1855) and Francisco Navarro Villoslada (1840). The latter stands out for his personal U-turn; while Luchana presented the Carlists as fanatic reactionaries, Navarro later embraced the Traditionalist perspective. Some scholars refer to a minor Asturian poet Robustiana Armiño as “propagandista del carlismo”, but in her literary works one might find merely endorsement of traditional social roles and in 1864 she penned an exalted poem honoring Isabella II. Despite their mostly propagandistic purpose some of these works contain interesting historical detail, e.g. shedding new light on origins of the word "guiri", a popular abuse used by the Carlists.

=== Prose ===
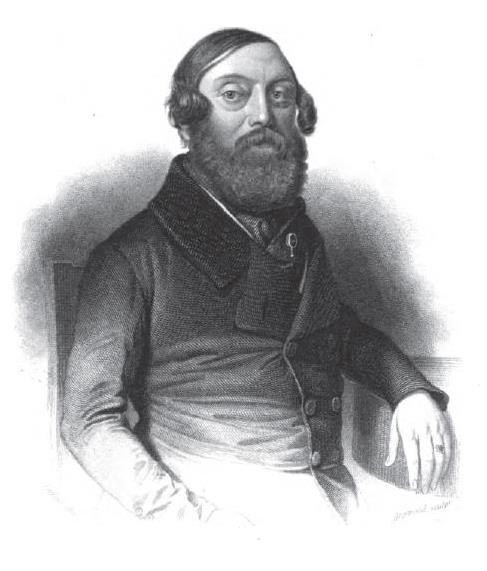
Ayguals de Izco

Prose was the last one to acknowledge the Carlist theme. Though Mariano José de Larra launched his first anti-Carlist works in 1833, they fall in an area in-between belles-lettres and journalism, at times looking like short stories and at times like satirical pamphlets. There were other works sharing the hybrid characteristics, e.g. the large Panorama de la Corte y Gobierno de D. Carlos by Manuel Lázaro (1839), also a satire on the Carlist claimant and his entourage. The first work which might clearly be considered a novel was Eduardo o la guerra civil en las provincias de Aragón y Valencia by Francisco Brotons (1840); set in the last war, it offered the Cristino perspective. Other novels soon followed; Los solitarios (1843) by unidentified author presented the court of Carlos V from a highly sympathetic perspective, Espartero by Ildefonso Bermejo (1845–1846) advanced vehemently anti-Carlist vision, while Diario de un médico by Máximo López García (1847) was an adventure story written in a truly Romantic fashion.

The Romantic historical novel reached its ultimate embodiment in works of Wenceslao Ayguals de Izco, especially in his Cabrera, El Tigre del Maestrazgo ó sea De grumete a general: historia-novela (1846–1848), sort of personal revenge on part of the author. Anti-Carlist threads feature prominently also in other of his novels, though these works do not fall into the historical novel rubric: María la hija de un jornalero (1845–1846), El palacio de los crímenes (1855) or La marquesa de Bellaflor (1869). Ayguals de Izco, hugely successful as a novelist, initiated the tone which would later turn dominant in terms of treatment of Carlists in the Spanish novel: they are presented as power-hungry hypocrites, ran by treacherous clergy and their ranks populated by criminals, prostitutes, assassins, thieves or simply mad cruel brutes. Fray Patricio from María, who runs the Angel Exterminador organization, was perhaps first in the gallery of Carlist literary monsters. A number of second-rate novels lambasting the Carlists as brainless brutes followed; an example is El Idiota ó los trabucaires del Pirineo (1857) by Pedro Mata y Fontanet.

When Spanish novel of the mid-19th century gradually emerged as important cultural weapon against the Carlists, their own response on the field was meager. Navarro Villoslada, now converted into legitimism, fathered a number of acclaimed and popular historical romantic novels, yet they are set in earlier times and at best might be viewed as offering a general Traditionalist perspective. Similarly Gabino Tejado Rodriguez, an active Carlist politician and editor, in his historical novels steered clear of Carlist themes, again saturating them with vague Traditionalism. Some sympathy for the Carlist cause might be traced in La Gaviota by Fernán Caballero (1849), a novel about the old and the new confronting each other in an Andalusian town. The only novel which might be considered obvious exaltation of Carlism is El orgullo y el amor by Manuel Ibo Alfaro (1855). Narciso Blanch e Illa, later a combatant during the Third Carlist War, in his historical novel Doce años de regencia (1863) used the romantic 15th-century setting to advocate the Carlist cause. Antonio Aparisi y Guijarro did not write belles-lettres and would not merit attention here if it had not been for his later peculiar role; in literature written two generations afterwards his writings would be presented as responsible for Carlist deviation of other literary protagonists.

=== Rural and international response ===
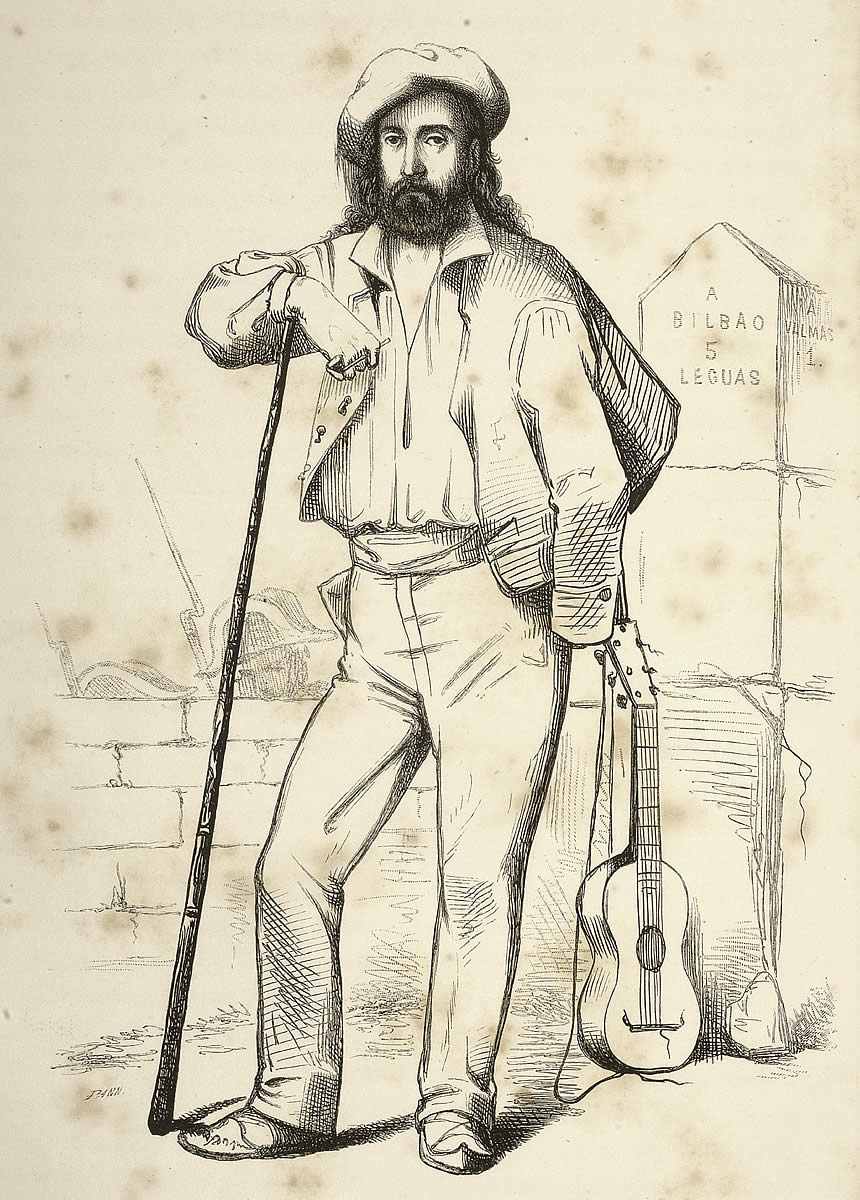
Iparraguirre

A separate genre which might not fully fit into the literature rubric is a flood of rhymes of mostly popular and rural origin, which remained alive at times for generations when passed on in oral tradition; they entered literature only when put into writing by later scholars, be it ethnographers or historians. Two such Carlist-related anthologies are available for rhymes in Castellano and in Euskara; both demonstrate overwhelming support for the Carlist cause among the rural folk, though principally among the Basques. Among mostly anonymous though at times identified authors (or co-authors), the one which definitely stands out is José María Iparraguirre, the best known Carlist bertsolari, author (or co-author) of perhaps the most famous Basque verses, Gernikako arbola, by some considered the iconic genuine poetic embodiment of Carlism. Others note Vicenta Moguel, herself a Carlist and author of Traditionalist poems in Basque. On the Catalan side, one has to note Lo cant de las veritats (1857) by an anonymous and so far unidentified author; it represents probably the first case of Carlist theme acknowledged in popular Catalan literature and is a blend of romantic sentimentalism, philosophical didactics and adventure story, half prosaic and half in rhymes.

In the European Romantic literature, always in pursuit of a myth, Carlism was not very popular. The Carlists met many criteria of Romanticism to qualify for heroes, yet they failed to make it to the standard Romantic imagery of the era. The German culture remained in constant quest for a cultural role model, with many and rather unintuitive candidates advanced, yet the Carlists have scarcely been considered. The exception is Zumala-Carregui, oder der Tod des Helden (1836) by Friedrich Seybold, a 5-act drama which presented the Carlist military commander as an exemplary Romantic hero. A novel Die Reise in das Leben (1840) by Friedrich Steger contains a typical blend of romance and travel in exotic and wartime setting. Merced (1845) by the Austrian writer Betty Paoli might appear to be in the same genre, though in fact the novel was a bitter treaty on the role of woman in the Biedermeier era. The Carlist volunteer from Germany, Felix Lichnowsky, was ridiculed in Leben und Thaten des berühmten Ritters Schnapphahnski (1849) by Georg Weerth. In France Carlism earned few sympathetic verses from legitimist poets like Edouard Turquety or Juliette Lormeau, but is only marginally present in great novels of the era. The second-rate one is Rosita. Souvenir d'Espagne (1839) by Pitre-Chevalier, translated to other languages and turned into a theatrical play by Laurencin; later it was attributed to Balzac. In Italian the Carlist cause was endorsed in poetry of Antonio Capece Minutolo. In Russian Romantic literature Carlists appear marginally and merely as a decorum. Though the British intervened militarily in the First Carlist War, literary traces of their engagement are few. One is The African wanderers; or the adventures of Carlos and Antonio (1844) by Sarah Lee. In The Wayside Cross: Or, the Raid of Gomez, a Tale of the Carlist War (1847) by E. A. Milman the Carlists are a wild bunch, spreading terror across Andalusia. A Walterscottian formula is replicated in a Canadian novel Jack Brag in Spain (1842) by John Richardson and the Polish one Pan Zygmunt w Hiszpanii (1852) by Teodor Tripplin. A Castle in Spain (1869) by a Canadian James De Mille and Isabella, Spaniens verjagte Königin (1869) by Georg Füllborn belong already to the new literary era.

== Realism ==
Realism shifted the attention of writers tackling the Carlist theme from poetry and drama to prose; it was the novel which emerged as the key genre where the question was discussed and it stays so until today. Very much like during the Romantic period, literature remained a battleground between the Carlists and the Liberals, the latter clearly gaining advantage. The single personality which was enough to shift the balance was Galdós, the first of Spanish literary giants who placed Carlism in centre of their attention; it was his writings which set the tone for decades and it was his hideous Carlist protagonists who populated imagination of the Spaniards for generations to come.

=== Early works ===
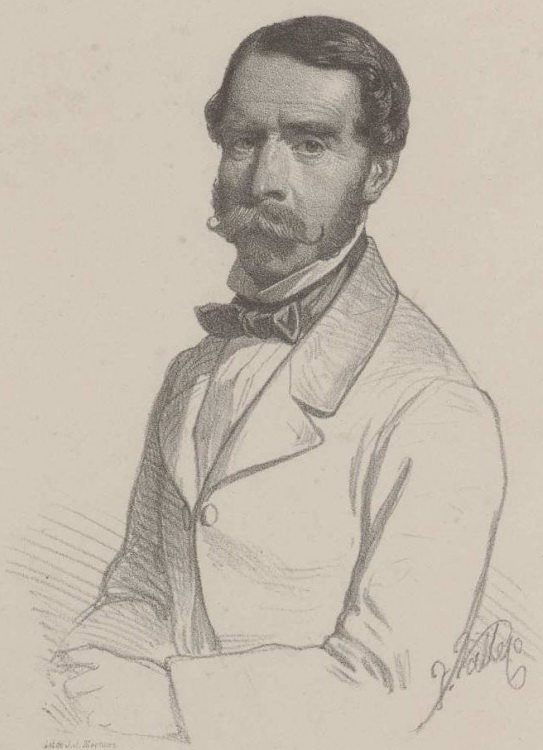
de Escosura

Like everywhere in Europe, periodization remains a problem in history of Spanish literature. Among many in-between figures of Spanish literature, Fernán Caballero with her Carlism-related works is often counted among the post-Romantic writers. The same is the case of Manuel Tamayo Baus, whose early works are counted into Romanticism and the later ones into Realism. Himself a Neocatólico who in the early 1870s joined the Carlists Tamayo was immensely popular as a playwright in the 1850s and 1860s. Tamayo's plays confront Liberalism from general Catholic Conservative positions, yet his Traditionalist leaning remained hardly veiled; according to one scholar, "el españolismo de Tamayo consiste en ser católico y carlista”. Though Carlism was a heated topic in the 1860s and early 1870s, especially in terms of legal/political debate and mostly thanks to works of the neocatólicos, it still failed to make it as a literary offer. Apart from partisan works, the drama of the 1860s was marked also by a current advancing pacifist threads and lamenting the horror of fratridical wars; it persisted well into the 1870s.

The first novel clearly tackling the Carlist theme and classified as falling into the Realism rubric is El patriarca del valle (1862) by Patricio de la Escosura, the Isabelline officer during the First Carlist War and a friend of O’Donnell later on. El Patriarca is a key work of early realist period; in terms of literary style it advances techniques typical for a new era, yet in terms of key message it conveys the same anti-Carlist narrative, presenting the opponents as hypocrites ran by the Jesuits and as murderers of bestial cruelty. The novel, fairly popular in the 1860s, features an extremely complex plot, covering also events of 1830 in France. It is valued by historians, as sections referring to the Madrid setting during the early phases of the war are possibly based on the author's first hand experience. Matilde o el Angel de Valde Real by Faustina Sáez de Melgar (1863), a historical novel partially set during the war and issued almost simultaneously as Escosura's work was far less popular amongst the public because of the sex of its author rather than because of its literary quality. Ellos y nosotros by Sabino de Goicoechea (1867) is the work based on extensive factual research and appearing to be of historiographic value; e.g. the discourse to what extent "fueros" formed part of the Carlist ideario of the 1830s is partially based on this very work, considered veristic in its literary style. Among the authors in transition between Romanticism and Realism Antonio Trueba was the one who made Carlism very much present in his novels and short stories, published mostly in the 1860s and 1870s. At times he might have appeared equidistant towards the Liberals and the Carlists; due to his Basque fuerismo some suspected him even of nurturing Carlist sympathies. However, though missing the usual anti-Carlist venom and liberal militancy, Trueba's works like Cuentos del hogar (1875) presented the fuerista and the Carlist causes as entirely incompatible.

In terms of literature outbreak of the Third Carlist War triggered some modest international response. Ernesto il disingannato (1873–1874) was a novel written by a so far unidentified Italian author; formatted as “political romance” it advanced the Traditionalist and Carlist cause. An entirely different type of adventure narrative is a story Der Gitano. Ein Abenteuer unter den Carlisten (1875), one of the first works by Karl May; cruel and barbarous lot, the Carlists resemble Comanches from his later world-famous writings. The genre championed by Jules Verne is followed in France by Alexandre de Lamothe in La Fille du Bandit (1875) and in Italy by Luigi Previti in I diamanti della principessa di Beira (1875); in England works of Edmund Randolph are formatted as a struggle with Catholic identity. A Brazilian-Portuguese poet António Gonçalves Crespo acknowledged Carlist savagery in poetry.

=== Novel: realismo, naturalismo, costumbrismo ===
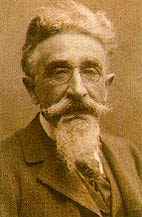
Pereda

Following the Third Carlist War the tone set by Ayguals de Izco has generally been reinforced and literary Carlists petrified in their role of fanatic cruel rednecks, ran by treacherous clergy. This time it was clearly the novel which became the key literary weapon, though it fell into two general genres: the historical one and the so-called novel of manners. Out of the former, Rosa Samaniego o la sima de Igúzquiza by Pedro Escamilla (1877) represents a new tone, unheard of in Romanticism. Focused on atrocities of the Carlist commander Samaniego, active during the last war – at that time the last was the Third Carlist War – it tended to brutal veracity. The same feature marks another novel dedicated to the same protagonist, Vida, hechos y hazañas del famoso bandido y cabecilla Rosa Samaniego (1880); its author remains yet to be identified. Brutality was brought to even higher, naturalistic levels in La sima de Igúzquiza by Alejandro Sawa (1888); at times it might seem that the author was more concerned about dazzling the reader with horrors and atrocities rather than with denouncing the Carlists or telling the right from the wrong.

A novel of manners which made great impact was Marta y María by Armando Palacio Valdés (1883). It is centred around the question of faith, yet it treats Carlism in a collateral way; one of the protagonists, María, represents religious fanaticism disguised as romantic contemplative vocation; the Carlist sympathies help to complete her portrait. Hugely popular La Regenta by Clarín (1884–1885) discussed threads of daily life, portraying Carlist supporters as fanatics basking in money and influence. Even minor authors of the genre denigrate Carlism; this is i.e. the case of Jacinto Octavio Picón or Manuel Curros Enríquez. Few novelists demonstrate an opposite stand, though; these to be named first are José María de Pereda and Emilia Pardo Bazán. Their novels, usually classified as costumbrismo or novela de tésis, steer clear of political themes, though in terms of the outlook advanced Pereda is by some considered one of few authors who pursue "Carlist thesis"; in this respect his key work is Peñas arriba (1895). Both Pereda and Bazán demonstrate understanding for their Carlism-related protagonists, usually marginal ones, even though some of them are ambiguous. A second-rate novelist who nurtured the very same longing for traditional values was Eva Canel; it was best expressed in Manolín (1891) and Oremus (1893); the same can be said about Modesto H. Villaescusa, who in novels like La tórtola herida (1892) explored late Carlism-flavored costumbrista threads in the Murcian cultural ambience. In case of the others, Carlism serves the purpose of building the atmosphere of tension. Cuadros de la guerra by Concepción Arenal (1880) is flavored with sentiment for author's record in the Carlist Hospital de Sangre in Miranda de Ebro yet in general it is considered an anti-war manifiesto. Julio Nombela contributed heavily to the Carlist cause as publisher and editor, yet his massive literary production was politically muted. Valentín Gómez Gómez had abandoned Carlism for Conservatism before he commenced the literary career.

=== Galdós ===
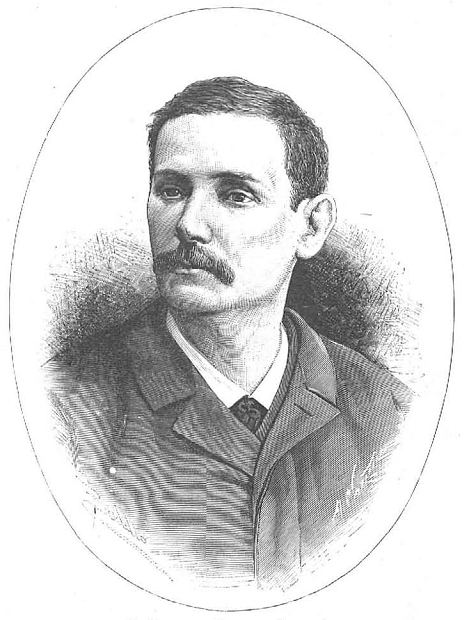
Galdós

Chronologically the first among giants of the Spanish literature who made Carlism a recurring and key motive of their works is Benito Pérez Galdós. The first two series of his monumental string of historical novels named Episodios nacionales are set before 1833 and it is the following ones, technically written already during the modernist period, which tackle the issue head on. However, they still represent typical Realism of their author and differ significantly – be it in terms of style or the role of Carlism – from the later modernist works. Also, besides Episodios Galdós fathered other numerous works featuring Carlism as a theme, written already since the 1870s. His objectives were clearly educative; his declared intention was to teach his compatriots their past. His political militancy made him par excellence the Spanish Liberal Crusader; as such, he intended to demonstrate what damage Carlism had inflicted upon the nation. Though Carlism enjoyed visible role in earlier historical novel, all the above rendered Galdós a figure who shaped the literary portrait of Carlism for generations to come.

In history of literature the prevailing view is that galdosian position on Carlism remains fairly stable and can be viewed as homogeneous. According to this theory, Galdós' Carlism was a monstrous beast that, thanks to enormous sacrifice of blood, has been driven away to the woods. People can roam the streets freely, but howling and groaning of the monster can be still heard; since the brute might re-appear in town any minute, vigilance is the order of the day. Such perspective offered no room for subtleties or impartial study and in these terms the work of Galdós does not differ from earlier partisan literature; perhaps the best example of such uncompromising educative hostility is Doña Perfecta (1876). A somewhat competitive view is that the author's perspective changed over time, especially after the American War disaster; the Liberal-Carlist confrontation became somewhat re-defined by a new perspective, and Galdós became less of a militant and more of a historian. Though clearly he demonstrated no sympathy for Carlism in volumes from the third and fourth Episodios Nacionales series, the movement is reportedly less and less pictured in Manichean and infernal terms; at times it might even appear that some personalities, e.g. the title protagonist of Zumalacárregui (1898), might be perceived as role models. His last works, like the theatrical play Sor Simona (1915), introduce a grade of ambiguity.

=== Carlist voice ===
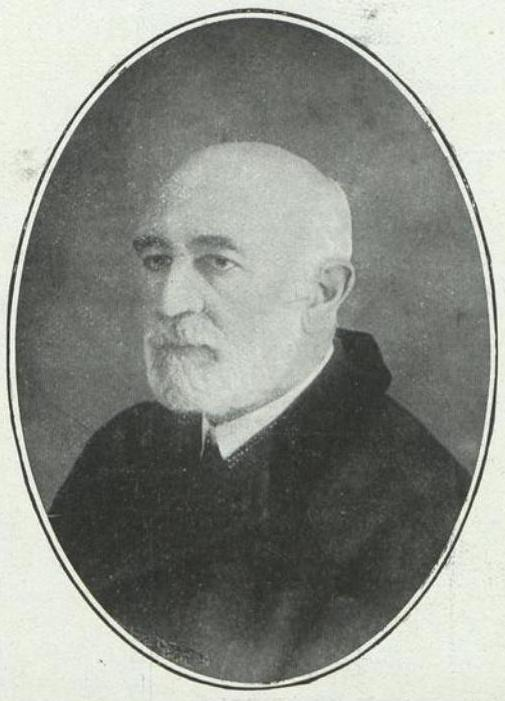
Polo

Also the Third Carlist War triggered popular cultural response, this time reduced almost entirely to the Basque linguistic realm and evading typical historical categories; this production is acknowledged in Karlisten Bigarren Gerrateko bertsoak, anthology edited by Antonio Zavala (1997). The Catalan response is usually associated with Jacinto Verdaguer Santaló, by some of his contemporaries considered "prince of the Catalan poets". A Traditionalist through all his life and a militant Carlist in his youth, he fathered a number of poems intended as a praise of Carlism. They are written in Catalan, exalted in style and very explicit politically. One of them is dubbed "the Carlist anthem" by later scholars, yet it seems it has never been printed and was re-constructed on basis of Verdaguer's manuscripts. The most explicit Carlist works ever written in Gallego were poems of Evaristo Martelo Paumán. Another Carlist militant Juan María Acebal wrote in Asturian dialect and was dubbed "el príncipe de los poetas bables"; his only volume Cantar y más cantar: impresiones de Asturias was published posthumously in 1911. There is no notable Carlist poetry in castellano; most pieces are related to wartime events and hail Carlist triumphs, like e.g. La Boina del Rey (1874) by Silvestre Ortiz y Peiro or later production of José Suárez de Urbina. A Carlist militant, José María Gabriel y Galán, wrote lyrics (also in Extremaduran dialect) saturated with religious reflection and traditional outlook, yet not with explicit Traditionalism. Attempts by top party politicians, like Cerralbo or Francisco Martín Melgar are rather literary curiosities, though the latter was awarded a literary prize. The claimant himself gained a few volumes of homage poems, conventional in style and falling into the general court poetry genre; a similar piece, addressed to María de las Nieves de Braganza, stands out as it was written in Occitan by the Carlist sympathizer and later Nobel Prize winner, Frédéric Mistral. Sure there was a parallel and much broader flow of similar production dedicated to the Alfonsist pretenders.

In prose the Carlist voice is down to few authors. Francisco Hernando Eizaguirre tried his hand mostly as historian yet he penned also a novel, Los Conspiradores (1885). Guerra sin cuartel by Ceferino Suárez Bravo (1885) is the exaltation of Carlism which has made most impact among its contemporaries until today; it got awarded the Academia prize. Manuel Polo Peyrolón fathered a number of novels, some vaguely and some explicitly promoting Carlism. The former group consists of Los Mayos (1878), a rural love story intended as a praise of loyalty and fidelity and considered his best work, Sacramento y concubinato (1884) and Quién mal anda, ¿cómo acaba? (1890), all aimed against liberal and secular lifestyles. The latter group consists of Pacorro (1905), which confronted deeds of a young liberal with virtues of a young Carlist, the story cast against the background of a small town undergoing the turbulent period of 1868–1876, and El guerrillero (1906), more of an adventure story; set during Third Carlist War, it was heavily based on wartime recollections of Polo's brother Florentino. Appreciated in the conservative realm as antidote to "the venom of Zola" today he is considered a second-rate representative of "novelas de tesis". The novel La heroína de Castellfort by Jorge Pinares (1888) was homage to Francisca Guarch, a Carlist female soldier. In drama the only Carlist voice heard was this of Leandro Ángel Herrero, a historian and editor rather than a playwright. A Murcian Carlist militant Carlos María Barberán has been contributing stories and poems since the 1860s, but remained known only locally; his unpublished drama Los Macabeos (before 1891) was homage to ancient people defending their religious identity.

== Modernism ==
In terms of Carlist motives, the key difference between Modernism and earlier literary eras was that the movement ceased to be perceived as a direct threat. The Romantic and Realist literature was defined by political militancy; the Modernist writers can already afford another position. For them Carlism is rather a vague phenomenon from the past, fading away yet still casting its dark shadow. Hence, in Modernist literature its role is rather to catalyze the discourse on national self and human condition. Modernism was also the period when Carlism as a motive enjoyed top popularity among the Spanish literary greats.

=== Unamuno ===
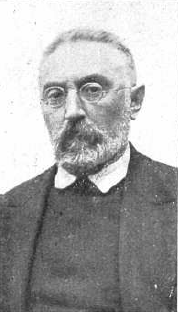
Unamuno

Among the giants of Generación de 1898 Miguel de Unamuno was chronologically the first one to address the Carlist question in a literary work; Paz en la guerra (1897) remained also his only novel featuring Carlism, though the phenomenon was discussed also in his numerous essays, treaties, studies and all genres which do not fall into belles-lettres. Nevertheless, Paz en la guerra is – perhaps along Baroja's Zalacaín el aventurero and Valle-Inclán's Sonata de invierno – the best known literary work related to Carlism. It is also one of the most ambiguous ones; analysis of its message and the role of Carlism is often heavily aided by quotations from Unamuno's non-literary works or private papers. One scholarly opinion is that Unamuno nurtured some sympathy for Carlism since he viewed it plainly as a form of regionalism. The opinion which prevails is that for Unamuno there were two Carlisms. One was genuine, rooted in the rural population but largely unconscious, communitarian if not socialist, federative and anarchist in spirit. This Carlism formed the most intimate layers of Spanish self and was present in "intrahistoria", a term coined by Unamuno and compared to massive, silent and invisible moves of waters in the depths of the ocean. Another Carlism was an ideological superstructure, built by "bachilleres, canónigos, curas y barberos ergotistas y raciocinadores", infected with Integrism and forming part of political history, this one compared to splashing waves on the ocean surface, noisy and picturesque, but built in one second and disappearing in another.

The two Carlisms are constantly present in Paz en la guerra, confusing both the protagonists and the readers; initially Unamuno was accused of nurturing Carlist sympathies, something he immediately denied. In fact, for him Carlism was an element in a dialectic process of forming national identity and as such could not have been simply ignored or rejected. The vision of Pachico from last pages of the novel, namely that "both sides were right and neither was right", is usually attributed to Unamuno himself. The title of the novel might be interpreted in two ways: as citizens of Bilbao finding internal peace amongst the Carlist siege, and as new life being born out of a dialectic confrontation. This confrontation was not necessarily symbolic; in numerous works and statements Unamuno openly praised civil war as means of overcoming dialectic differences. It was only once he had learnt the deadly toll of first months of the Spanish Civil War that he changed his view. He considered re-writing Paz en la guerra, probably with much less understanding for Carlism; in the last document written before death Unamuno claimed that the emerging Nationalist regime was spiritually governed by a Carlism-inspired "Catholic Traditionalist paganism".

=== Valle-Inclán ===
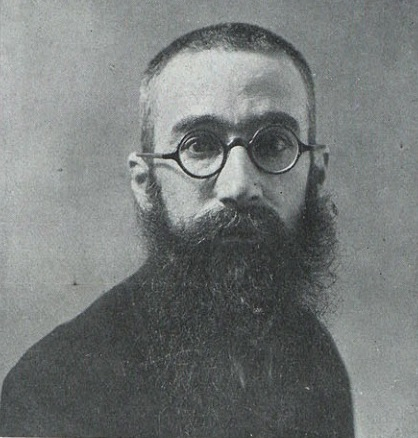
Valle-Inclán

Among noventayochistas Valle-Inclán is perhaps the most controversial figure when it comes to defining his position towards Carlism. It remains beyond doubt that the motive, though not omnipresent, features very prominently in his novels, from the Sonatas tetralogy (1902–1905) to the La Guerra Carlista trilogy (1908–1909) to the El ruedo ibérico series (1927–1932), apart from works which do not fall into the above cycles, first of all La Corte de Estella (1910). The controversy is whether the apparent exaltation of Carlism, demonstrated by many of his protagonists and not infrequently also by storytellers of his novels, should be taken at face value or whether it is part of an ironic and perhaps provocative discourse. Quoting numerous and undeniable biographical details some claim that Valle-Inclán was a genuine though somewhat heterodox Carlist. Others point to apparently incompatible episodes from his biography, e.g. being awarded a high Carlist honor in 1931, co-founding Asociación de Amigos de la Unión Soviética in 1933 and declaring himself an admirer of Fascism and Mussolini in 1936; they square the circle by concluding that Carlism was one of many masks that Valle-Inclán used to wear.

Settling the issue on basis of literature only seems close to impossible. For some, Valle-Inclán's Carlism represents grandeur of history, tradition, idealism, authenticity, spirit of freedom and heroism, as opposed to bourgeoisie narrow-mindedness and the Spain of mean niggards; it is part of regeneracionismo, a call to do away with the Restoration regime. For others, Carlism represents an ambiguous myth, an illusion, sometimes bordering farce; its role is to catalyze a discourse about Spanish history, which blends glory with absurd. Carlist setting is not to evoke a romantic glow but quite to the contrary, "para presentar personajes satánicos, brutales o por lo menos misteriosos". According to this reading, Valle-Inclán's Carlism is about irony, caricature, grotesque, parody and farce. Always longing for grandeur and idealism, in fact he finds scarce authenticity in the movement, as in some of Valle-Inclán's novels "solo los ancianos suspiran por lealtad ya desaparecida". His key protagonist and perhaps the only goody among Carlists populating the great Spanish literature, Marqués de Bradomín, is a Carlist of his very own breed.

=== Baroja ===
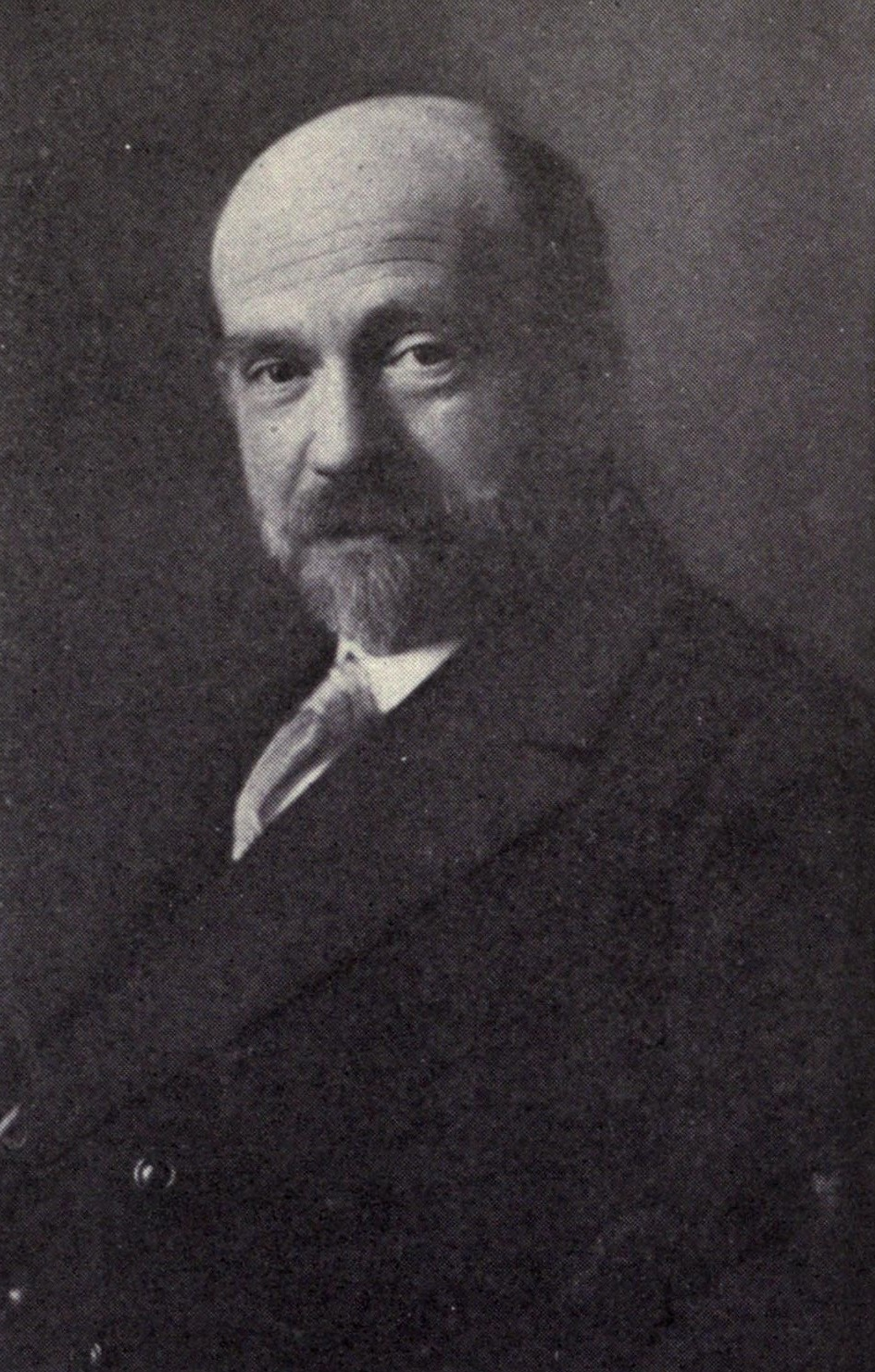
Baroja

Among the giants of Spanish Modernism Baroja was the one who experienced most personal contact with Carlism, from his infancy days in the besieged San Sebastián to his senility in Vera de Bidasoa. Carlism is the key theme in a few of his works – the best known of them Zalacaín el aventurero (1908), and is very much present in many others – e.g. 11 out of 22 volumes of Memorias de un hombre de acción (1913–1935) are set during the Carlist wars, though it is also entirely absent in many other novels. Among the noventayochistas – perhaps except Blasco Ibañez – Baroja is also the one most hostile to Carlism. Though he considered it "cosa muerta" and viewed rather the corrupted Restoration regime as key enemy of his Republican ideal, he still approached the gloomy Carlist legacy as haunting the Spanish and more specifically the Basque self. From his Nietzschean perspective Carlism was the movement of the weak, animated by the Church and luring those unable to become "men of action". Heavily attracted to rural vitality, at times primitive and brutal yet authentic, he lamented that it got hijacked by ideology powered by the priests, with the result of "double bestiality of being a Catholic and a Carlist".

Hardly anyone of numerous Carlists, populating the novels of Baroja, is a man who joined the movement out of conviction: they are foreigners, adventurers, criminals escaping justice, blinded fanatics incapable of reasoning, little men curing their inferiority complex, exalted boys who have read too much, village dumbs, those seeking personal revenge, those trying to get rich, those brainwashed by priests, those broken by failure in love, those willing to indulge, those bullied to join by their family, those conscripted by force, and so on and so on. Though Baroja was attracted to what he saw as authentic rural virility in the Carlist ranks, he believed it endured despite, not because of their very Carlist nature. His best known protagonist, Zalacaín, as a genuine man of action not only abandons the Carlists but he also beats them up and tricks them. Baroja is careful to strip the Carlists of their notorious machista appearance, in his vision reduced to cowardly brutality. Not only they can not wage the war like men, pursuing cowardly tactics and harassing women and children, but they are also beaten in one-to-one juvenile fistfights and lose miserably in pelota; of course, they are neither a match for their opponents when it comes to attracting females. A specific appendix to Baroja's concept of Carlism was written in July 1936, when he left his home in Vera to watch a Requeté column on the march across Navarre. He was identified, personally and as enemy of religion and Carlism, and at a roadside he was held by the Carlists at gunpoint. Following a brief discussion whether he should be executed, the 64-year-old got off with a punch in the face.

=== Other writers ===
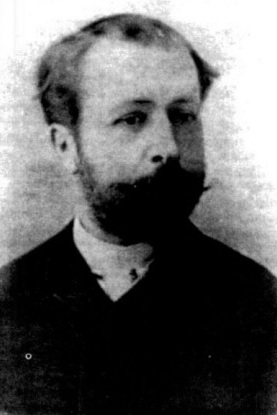
Vayreda

Baroja, Valle-Inclán and Unamuno made Carlism the key protagonist of the greatest Modernist works; another of the noventayochistas, Vicente Blasco Ibañez, preferred to fight the Carlists on the streets and only marginally allowed them presence in his novels. The most explicit case is La catedral (1903); the work is resemblant of an old-style militant assault rather than of the Modernist ambiguous discourse, as the Carlists are portrayed typically as hypocrites, who in the name of God engage in most ungodly atrocities or simply indulge in most earthly pleasures. Other personalities of Generación de 1898 did not feature Carlism or Carlists in their works; Azorín confronted them a number of times in his press contributions, yet they are not considered here.

The genuine Carlist literary voice was hardly heard during the Modernist era. In prose the most popular author was Antonio de Valbuena, who developed a genre dubbed "novela de edificación"; perhaps its samples, first of all Aqua turbiente, should rather be viewed as part of the late Realist literature. Historical novel is represented by Ramón Esparza Iturralde. Novels of a Carlist zealot Domingo Cirici Ventalló fall into a political fantasy genre; advancing a Carlist perspective they assault the Liberal outlook; his best known works are La República española en 1.91... (1911) and La tragedia del diputado Anfrúns (1917). In Catalan a very particular position is held by Marian Vayreda i Vila. As author of heterogeneous short pieces Recorts de la darrera carlinada (1898) he is compared to such authors of war stories as Hemingway or Babel, while his novel La Punyalada (1904) is counted among masterpieces of Catalan literature of all time. Both are set in the Carlist milieu, yet their message remains ambiguous; some consider La Punyalada a veiled discourse on the very nature of Carlism. In gallego a novel with clear Traditionalist message was A Besta! by Patricio Delgado, serialised in a local weekly in 1899–1900. The novel by a former Carlist was Blancos y negros (1898) by Arturo Campión, a discourse on Basque identity. Another former Carlist Ciro Bayo released Dorregaray. Una correría por el Maestrazgo (1912), half-way between historical novel, adventure story and a memoir.

Perhaps the best-known Carlist rhymes were born in 1908, when Ignacio Baleztena wrote Spanish lyrics to the originally Basque Carlist anthem Oriamendi. The first attempts at Carlism-flavored written Basque poetry were recorded by Ramos Azcarate Otegui. Three Carlist poets somewhat popular at the time were Pilar de Cavia, Enrique de Olea, and Florentino Soria López; especially Soria was rather unambiguous in his political sympathies, on display in the Cantos a la Tradición volume (1911). Joan Bardina during his Carlist phase in the 1890s fathered militant and exalted poems and satires. In case of drama, not exactly Catalan but rather Valencian was the language that Eduard Genovès i Olmos, "un Jaumiste de pura sang", used when writing his drama Comandant per capità (1915). Juan Ortea Fernandez fathered a one-act comedy Requeté (1912). The "comico y costumbrista" Carlos Arniches, author of vastly popular comical theatrical pieces who ran at the Carlist ticket to the Cortes, steered clear of political topics. The case of virulent anti-Carlist zarzuela was a joint work Vaya calor (1908). Among foreign authors there was US-born John Oliver Hobbes and four Britons, who fathered fast-paced adventurous novels: Henry Seton Merriman, Arthur W. Marchmont, G. A. Henty, and Heber Daniels. A story of its own is a very short narrative Ego te absolvo (1905), by some attributed to Oscar Wilde. Authentic or not, it demonstrates that the prevailing Spanish image of a Carlist crossed the Pyrenees: a Carlist was brutal, wild, and loose about his religious principles; however, there were also opposite stereotypes held. In France, Comte de Saint-Aulaire released a conventional historical novel Carlistes et Christinos (1895), while La Troisième Jeunesse de Madame Prune by Pierre Loti (1905) marginally but sympathetically featured the Carlist infant, Don Jaime. In Italy Giovanni Martini, the representative of literary cattolicesimo intransigente, wrote a drama Don Pedro di Elisonda (1900).

== Catastrophism ==
Spanish literature of the 20th century poses a major problem in terms of periodisation, with many conflicting proposals offered; it seems close to impossible to single out an aesthetic literary trend generally accepted as prevailing or even to specify temporal borderlines for any given period, regardless of its would-be name. The periodisation accepted here is focused on breakdown of traditional structures and extreme instability, entangled in conflict and eventually producing confrontation. Harboring a concept of violent clash as unavoidable outcome of current crisis, from the late regeneracionistas to the personalities of the Second Republic, is at times dubbed "catastrofismo". In terms of the Carlist theme, this period differs from Modernism very clearly; the interest in Carlism deteriorated, and during Primoderiverismo and the Second Republic the motive almost disappeared from literature, save for some noventayochistas continuing their older threads. The Civil War produced a brief spate of literature intended to mobilise support for the belligerent parties, including the Carlists.

=== Interwar novel: great names ===
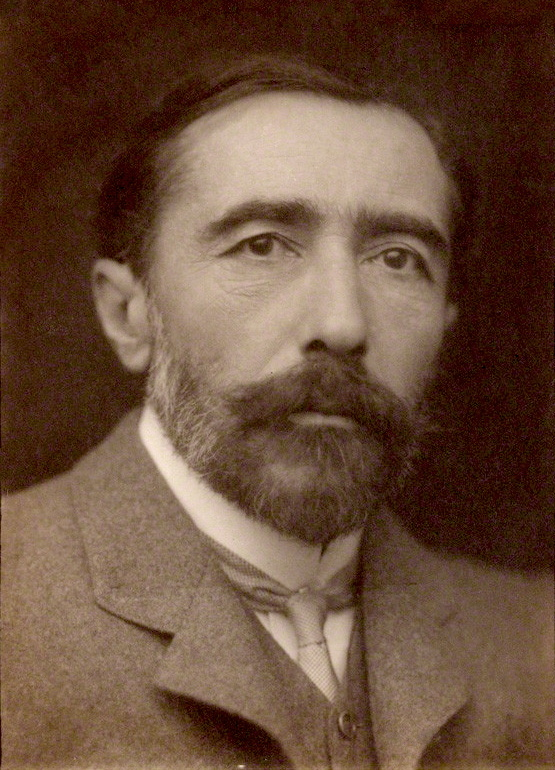
Conrad

Among great writers from the 1898 generation Baroja kept writing along the lines he had developed during Modernism, and at least in terms of the Carlist thread the late novels from Memorias de un hombre de acción released in the 1920s/30s and Zalacaín of 1908 form the same homogeneous opus. Unamuno has abandoned the Carlist motive, though he kept tackling the phenomenon in his treaties and studies. Some scholars claim that in case of Valle-Inclán one can speak of a new quality, resulting from his experiences during the First World War. Initially when in his role of a war correspondent Valle-Inclán posed as a Carlist-like patriarch, touring the frontlines in red beret and semi-military gear, but many students claim that war changed his perspective on grandeur and glory. They maintain that Valle-Inclán abandoned his earlier reportedly genuine Carlism and turned towards new ideas, perhaps somewhat attracted by the appeals of both Fascism and Communism. El ruedo ibérico (1927–1932) is viewed as increasingly saturated with grotesque and farcical Carlism; the change is sealed when Marqués de Bradomín eventually abandons legitimism.

One of few rare cases of Carlism featured as key motive in writings of a literary giant who did not come from a Hispanic culture is The Arrow of Gold by Joseph Conrad (1919). The Polish-English writer claimed he had been himself involved in smuggling arms for the rebels along the Mediterranean coast during the Third Carlist War, yet historians of literature do not agree whether these claims should be taken seriously. However, he must have at least witnessed Carlist conspiracy in Southern France of the early-1870s and some suspect even a flaming love affair with Carlist motives in the background. The Arrow of Gold seems heavily based on these juvenile experiences, yet Carlism serves mostly as a background evoking an atmosphere of mystery. It is difficult to find either particular sympathy or particular hostility for the movement, yet many scholars claim that the key protagonist considered Conrad's alter-ego was cynically used by Carlist conspirators. On the other hand, the mysterious heroine he falls in love with, Doña Rita, is a Carlist, though this seems to have little to do with the love affair. Overall, the novel is considered a treaty on "emotional boundary between people"; Conrad has never again displayed any literary interest in Spanish issues.

Carlism attracted also another English writer, at that time yet to become eminent, Graham Greene. Either in the late 1920s or in the very early 1930s he wrote The Episode, the novel which traced the experiences of an idealistic young man against very loose background of revolutionary turmoil in the 19th-century Spain; the narrative contained non-marginal Carlist threads. The novel has never been published, but some of its threads and protagonists were recycled in Rumour at Nightfall (1931), the work considered Greene's "first Catholic novel", set during the First Carlist War. The novel's torrid action focuses upon a love affair and jealous relationship of two Englishmen, which dominates over potentially exciting political action. The protagonists become infatuated with a beguiling Catholic woman, highly resemblant of Conrad's female protagonist Doña Rita, while another elusive protagonist, a Carlist commander Cavera, bears some resemblance to Cabrera. By critics the novel is considered a rather unfortunate attempt “to combine the conflicting forms of a Christian morality drama and an international adventure story"; the role of Carlism is to evoke moral dilemmas related to "intense spirit of religious devotion".

=== Interwar novel: not-so-great names ===
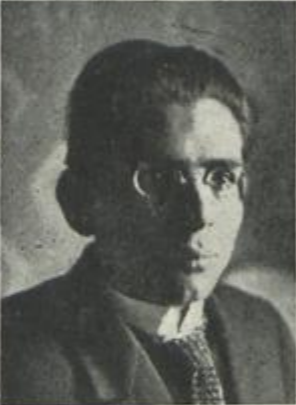
Rico

Another foreigner who demonstrated interest in Carlism was Pierre Benoit, one of the most-read French writers of the 20th century and himself a Traditionalist; he adhered to its specific secular breed, in France shaped by the personality of Charles Maurras. His Pour don Carlos (1920) was marked by Benoit's trademark style: well-constructed adventurous plot combined with good historiographic research and somewhat simplified psychology; in terms of political sympathies it clearly hailed the legitimist cause. The novel was fairly popular and in 1921 it served as a screenplay for a movie of the same title, perhaps the first one featuring the Carlist theme. A legitimist sympathiser Jules Laborde fathered Une vengeance carliste (1927), set during the Third Carlist War. In Nazi Germany Johannes Reinwaldt released a novel Der Königsthron (1937), set during the First Carlist War. Carlist themes featured also in third-rate sensational prose, e.g. Don Jaime was a protagonist of Piętno przekleństwa (1924), a novel in Polish by a Russian author Nikolay Breshko-Breshkovsky. Distant Carlist echoes reverberate in II figlio del pastore (1930) by Lorenzo Viani, a novel based on infant recollections of the author from Viareggio.

Amongst the Spanish novelists Gabriel Miró is a writer counted among Generación de 1914. He is worth noting because his Oleza novels, e.g. El abuelo del rey (1915), provide a veiled discourse on tradition and change with Traditionalism present in the background. Moreover, in his later novels some of his Carlist personalities, like Don Alvaro from Nuestro Padre San Daniel (1921) and El obispo leproso (1926) escape the usual scheme and provide an ambiguous and rather mysterious point of reference. Due to his Carlist motives, some scholars consider Miró one of key writers who formed the Carlist literary image. Estanislao Rico Ariza, active under the pen-name "Francisco de Paula Calderón", was a Carlist militant involved in clashes with the Anarchists. Banking on his first-hand experience he released a unique novel on Anarchist terrorism, Memorias de un terrorista: Novela episódica de la tragedia barcelonesa (1924); 12 years later he paid for it with his life. Benedicto Torralba de Damas fathered En los nidos de antaño (1926), a novel which in the Traditionalist realm earned him the prestige of "distinguido literato". Dolores Gortázar, a Carlist militant active as a propagandist in the early 1920s, during the primoderiverista period was very popular as a novelist; however, she penned banal prose deprived of ideological threads. Benjamin Jarnés penned his Zumalacárregui, el caudillo romántico (1931) in a very peculiar way; his protagonist is presented as more than a military hero, a genius embodiment of individuality who could have been an icon of both the Carlists and the Liberals, "artista de la acción". Villaescusa excelled in historical prose with La odisea de un quinto (1930), the Traditionalism-flavored novel set during the Third Carlist War; of similar genre, Florentino Soria López released Los titanes de la raza (1925), featuring exalted patriotism rather than Carlism. Antonio Pérez de Olaguer commenced his later longtime literary career with a somewhat new genre, a grotesque novel La ciudad que no tenía mujeres (1932).

Among writers advancing clearly anti-Carlist views the one to be singled out is Félix Urabayen, who set some of his novels in Navarre. In El barrio maldito (1925) he portrays the province as held in reactionary grip of the Carlists, who themselves are traditionally presented as hyprocrytes; in Centauros del Pirineo (1928) in a somewhat Barojian manner he hailed smugglers, who represent "sensibilidad fina, moderna, europea" as opposed to "elemento tradicionalista". In another Carlist stronghold, Catalonia, one has to note Pere Coromines, whose anti-Carlist zeal climaxed in the novel Silèn (1925); however, though a man of vehemently liberal convictions, he still preferred Carlist triumph to continuation of the corrupted Alfonsine monarchy. The future prime minister and president of Spain, Manuel Azaña, in his Fresdeval (1931) pictured Carlism as a half-dead relic – even if depicted with some melancholy – of old aristocratic Spain.

=== Drama and poetry ===
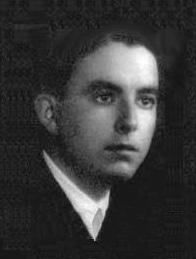
Hinojosa

Drama lost importance as political battleground already in the mid-19th century, yet echoes of Carlism-related debates were heard also among the playwrights. Among the spate of pro-Republican theatrical pieces of the 1920s or even more militantly left-wing dramas of the early 1930s many contained more or less explicit Carlist threads. Because of its author a good example is La corona (1931) by Manuel Azaña; it featured a Traditionalist, Aurelio, who first leads a coup against the legitime ruler and then murders a Liberal protagonist. Works written by the Carlists were far less popular, staged on local scenes, Carlist circulos or religious establishments. Within this realm a particular position was held by Manuel Vidal Rodríguez, related to the Integrist breed of Traditionalism. In three first decades of the 20th century, he was contributing as a prosaist and publisher, though especially as a playwright; his dramas embrace religious topics in historical setting, like La Reina Lupa (1924). His stand in the realm of letters, however, stemmed rather from his role as professor of lengua y literatura castellanas in the University of Santiago de Compostela. Sympathy for Carlism is clearly visible in early works of José del Rio Sainz; they climaxed in his poema dramático La amazona de Estella (1926), considered a Carlist homage. There were also a few, usually young people associated with Carlism who tried their hand as playwrights. Antonio Pérez de Olaguer made his name within the Carlist realm of the early 1930s as a novelist and essayist, though he contributed also to drama. Together with Benedicto Torralba de Damas he was the author of Más leal que galante (1935), a fairly unique, explicit theatrical Carlist manifiesto which earned him the status of a party literary celebrity. Few militant and moralizing dramas classified as costumbrismo nostalgico were written by Jaime del Burgo. Today plays like Lealtad (1932), Cruzados (1934), Al borde de la traición (1936) are considered "ejemplos de teatro carlista tradicionalista”, with their key objective identified as presenting genuine Navarre and its customs as the fortress of traditional values.

In poetry Cristóbal Botella y Serra kept publishing poetry under pen-names in Integrist periodicals like El Siglo Futuro until he died in unclear circumstances in the early 1920s. Another Carlist poetic offshoot was Florentino Soria López, who abandoned Jaimismo and sided with the rebellious Mellistas, later amalgamating into primoderiverista institutions. The old orthodox party executive José Pascual de Liñán y Eguizábal also went on with poetic pieces, his classic verses praising traditional Spanish virtues, commenting ongoing events and honoring great men of Carlism. Some foreigners considered him "the best Spanish poet". A poet from the younger generation, Manuel García-Sañudo, whose literary Carlist zeal carried him behind bars during the late Restoration years, moved from early lyrics of Sonetos provincianos (1915) and Romance de pobres almas (1916) to more belligerent strophes related to his assignment to Morocco. Francisco Ureña Navas, a Carlist publisher from Jaen, was locally recognized for his traditionalist poems, published in Hojas y flores (1922); he was the leader of a local poetic grouping "El Madroño". Luis Carpio Moraga, a writer from Baeza, wrote a sonnet in honour of the Carlist politician Juan Vázquez de Mella a few days before the beginning of the Spanish Civil War. Last but not least, on the vanguard end there was José María Hinojosa, the young Carlist jefe in the province of Málaga and contributor to Spanish surrealist poetry; however, instead of Carlist themes he advanced somewhat icononoclastic vision. Hinojosa, along Ureña Navas, Torralba de Damas, Carpio Moraga and Rico Ariza, is among Carlist writers killed by their political opponents. In Gallego the Traditionalist poetry was contributed by Enrique García-Rendueles; another author from Galicia who flavored some of his poems with Carlist threads was Antonio Rey Soto.

=== War literature ===
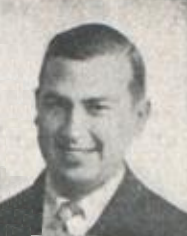
Pérez de Olaguer

The 1936 outbreak of the warfare triggered a spate of literary works intended to mobilize support and sustain enthusiasm. Literary production of the Republicans remained far lower than on the opposite side; in none of some 30 works identified there is a Carlist personaje worth noting, though some feature Carlist themes, like A sangre y fuego by Manuel Chaves Nogales (1937) or Loretxo by Txomin Arruti (1937). Among the nacionales there were at least 10 novels which featured the Carlists as major protagonists. They all fall into the wartime version of novela de tésis; written with clear moralizing objectives in mind they offer unelaborate narrative and sketchy Manichean personalities. This surge of novels glorifying Carlism lasted shortly and is at times dubbed the Carlist literary "swan song"; following the 1937 unification decree literature was increasingly tailored to fit in official propaganda, which permitted Carlist threads only when leading to amalgamation into FET.

The novel singled out as the most typical of Carlist literary vision of the war is El teniente Arizcun by Jorge Claramunt (1937); other candidates are El Muro by José Sanz y Díaz (1937) Guerra en el frente, paz en las almas (1936), Hágase tu voluntad (1937), La Rosa del Maestrazgo (1939) by Concepción Castella de Zavala; Rosa-roja y flor de lis (1936), La mochila del soldado (1937) by Juan Bautista Viza, and the novels of Jesús Evaristo Casariego: Flor de hidalgos (1938) and especially La ciudad sitiada (1939), the latter dubbed "patética apología del carlismo". La promesa del tulipán by Ignacio Romero Raizábal (1938) is slightly distinct as its protagonist is not the usual idealist but a sybarite who undergoes evolution before he volunteers to Requeté and finds reward, also in matters of the heart. La enfermera de Ondárroa by Jorge Villarín (1938) untypically focuses on female figure, who dies with Viva Cristo Rey on her lips. Unlike a characteristically post-unificación work of Villarín and like Casariego, Pérez de Olaguer in short stories Los de siempre (1937) and a novel Amor y sangre (1939) advanced the Carlist cause up to the limits permitted by censorship, heroic Carlists are also protagonists of Por mi Patria y por mi dama by Ramón Solsona y Cardona (1938). Triunfo and En el gloria de amanacer by María Sepulveda (both 1938) are samples of novels where the Carlists do not dominate, merged in a patriotic blend perfectly as expected by the regime. An infantile version of wartime literature was a Carlist review Pelayos.

The Spanish Civil War triggered massive literary response abroad, yet most authors ignore Carlist threads; they are absent either in well-known works like The Confidential Agent by Graham Greene (1939) and L’Espoir by André Malraux (1945), or in most minor pieces, though there are exceptions. Definitely the most famous literary work written during or shortly after the Spanish Civil War, For Whom the Bell Tolls of Ernest Hemingway (1940), is only marginally related to the Carlist theme. A minor character lieutenant Paco Berrendo does not resemble a typical Carlist literary monster; also an anonymous mounted requeté, shot by Robert Jordan, is portrayed with compassion, resulting perhaps not that much from Hemingway's idea of Carlism but because of his fascination with Navarre. The Carlist theme attracted also few less-known writers, though. A novel of above-the-average literary quality is Requeté by the French author Lucien Maulvault (1937). The work stands out for psychological undertones, unpredictable twists and turns of the plot and the overall tragic perspective. Sympathetic to the requeté effort rather than to Carlism as such, the novel laments the horror of civil war and seems pre-configuration of existentialist literature; others underline rather that it "articulates the aesthetics of engagement".

== Francoism ==
Terminology and periodization problems related to history of Spanish literature in the 20th century apply also to the years after the Civil War. "Francoism" is generally a term used to denote a political system, not a prevailing cultural or literary trend, though it might be employed also in this mode. Alternative designations applied to culture of the era are "nacionalcatolicismo" or "fascismo", though both are disputed. In terms of the Carlist motive in literature, the period is marked by a specific approach, which was heavily related to official control over cultural life and which reflected political role of Carlism in the Francoist Spain. Carlism was welcome when presented as a glorious movement of the past; on the other hand, Carlism was unwelcome as a cultural proposal for the present. The novel which turned into a best-selling book set in the Civil War and published in Francoist Spain, Un millón de muertos by José María Gironella (1961), also presented the Carlists in highly ambivalent terms.

=== Novela de tesis ===
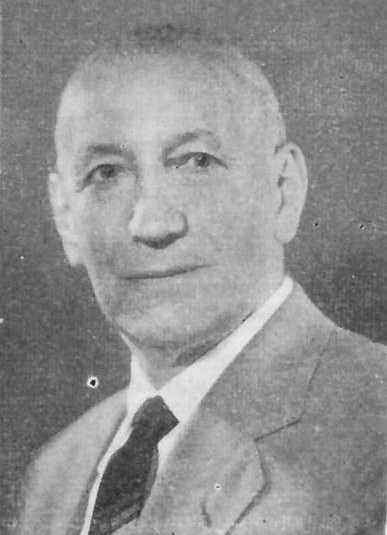
Lopez Sanz

During first decades of post-war Spain the trend which clearly prevailed when it comes to the Carlist theme was continuation of the wartime-style novels; it was visible in the 1940s but started to dry out and disappeared almost completely in the 1950s. None of the key features changed: nagging moralising objectives, sketchy and Manichean characters, Civil War setting, lively yet predictable plot. As Falange was clearly gaining the upper hand in internal power struggle, also the Falangist historical perspective started to prevail, with Carlist characters relegated to secondary roles in the narrative; this is the case of Rafael García Serrano and his La fiel infanteria (1943), Cuando los dioses nacían en Extremadura (1947), Plaza del Castillo (1951) or Los ojos perdidos (1958). Casariego kept writing, but the most successful of his wartime novels, Con la vida hicieron fuego (1953), did not contain Carlist threads. Re-published a number of times and translated into French, English, German and Italian, it featured a fisherman's son turned navy commander; the novel soon served as screenplay for a movie. José Sanz y Díaz kept writing, releasing – among numerous non-narrative works – the novels El secreto del Lago (1943) and La herrería de Hoceseca (1950). Con capa y chistera (1945) and Mi ciudad y yo (1948) are Spanish translations of originally Catalan novels of Ramón Solsona, both heavily based on his own experience when in hiding in the Republican zone.

In the 1940s Eladio Esparza wrote a number of novels which did not explicitly endorse Carlism, but rather formed a praise of general Traditionalism which gave rise to Carlist currents. The novels of Jaime del Burgo assumed a heterogeneous format. His Huracán (1943) was a fairly conventional novel initially set in pre-war Barcelona. El valle perdido (1942) involved magic threads. Finally, Lo que buscamos (1951) traditionally acclaimed patriotic merits but embraced the tone of bitterness and naturalism, if not indeed melancholy. La casa by a Carlist militant Dolores Baleztena (1955) traces a Navarrese family which cultivated family and regional values when living in Idaho. Chronologically the last novel of the genre is ¡Llevaban su sangre! by a prolific Carlist publisher Francisco López Sanz (1966). The novel stands out due to its political intransigence, especially that it was recommended more than quarter of a century after the end of the Civil War; López argued that the defeated Republicans did not deserve any compassion, as they would respond with "imperdonable ingratitud". Novels which clearly confronted the Francoist unification had no chance of being published and remained in manuscript, like Camino de la Cartuja by Ramón Niubó Aymerich. The only related novelas de tésis written on exile identified are Ekaitzpean by José Eizagirre (1948) and Laztantxu eta Betargi by Sebert Altube (1957). The former features a patriarch Basque Carlist who decides to join the gudaris, the latter pictures a girl from a well-off family who has to overcome resistance of her Carlist relatives to marry a simple worker, a Basque nationalist. Not exactly novelas de tésis but rather novels which offer a Traditionalist historiographic vision of Italian past are works of Carlo Alianello, some of which – like L'eredità della priora (1963) contain explicit Carlist threads. Foreign version of novela de tesis is Hermanos! (1969) by William Herrick, where requetes are depicted as monstrous beasts; similar perspective prevails in The Armed Rehearsal (1960) by Peter Elstob.

=== Adventure novel ===
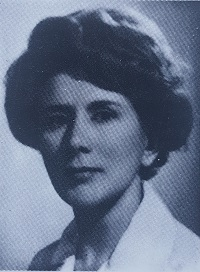
Miguel Arazuri

Many of the wartime novelas de tesis were built upon action-packed intrigues, yet nagging moralising objectives and clear pedagogical if not propagandistic purpose usually prevailed over their adventurous features. This is not the case of another novelistic subgenre, where adventure is on the forefront; it might be cast in historical or contemporary setting. In Spanish history of literature they are dubbed "novela de aventura" or – usually when romance threads prevail – "novela rosa", the latter intended mostly for female audience. This kind of literature was another one featuring the Carlist threads and Carlist protagonists; unlike novela de tesis works falling into this rubric were usually though not always cast against the historic framework, especially during the Carlist Wars of the 19th century. Especially in case of Carlist authors such background allowed more flexibility when promoting their political cause, subject to much more rigorous censorship scrutiny in case of the last civil war. This literature was on the rise since the 1940s, in mid-Francoism becoming the key platform of sustaining Carlist presence in culture. One of its last examples is Los hermanos carlistas (1969) by Juan Cepas.

Most of the Carlist authors who contributed to party propaganda as editors, publishers or authors of novelas de tesis tried their hand in adventure novel. Casariego published Jovellanos, o el equilibrio: ideas, desventuras y virtudes del inmortal hidalgo de Gijón (1943) and Romances modernos de toros, guerra y caza (1945). Pérez de Olaguer specialized in travel literature yet he fathered also Hospital de San Lázaro, sub-titled "autobiografia novelesca" (1953). Sanz y Díaz was closest to formatting his novels as novela histórica when focusing on historic figures in Santo Tomás de Villanueva (1956), Castillos (1959) or Tirso de Molina (1964). Ignacio Romero Raizábal saturated with Traditionalism his Como hermanos (1951), Héroes de romance (1952), 25 hombres en fila (1952), and El príncipe requeté (1965). However, two prolific Carlist authors who excelled in this literature were females, Concepción Castella de Zavala (some 15 novels), and Miguel Arazuri (some 40 works). Their novels are cast in vastly different settings, from the early 19th century to contemporary Spain. Intended for popular audience they indeed make an easy read, featuring adventurous or romantic plots; the Carlists often appear as key protagonists. While writings of Romero Raizabál, who penned also poetry, reflect a penchant for sentimental format, it is not the case of Arazuri/Gutíerrez. An analytical intellectual, she diagnosed that in culture dominated by mass media the dissemination was key, and Carlism would be better served by simple but popular novels rather than by great sophisticated works read by few. Les històries naturals of Joan Perucho (1960) was a vastly popular vampyrical fantasy which commenced the trend, popular later, to increasingly deviate from a typical adventure story. A place of his own is held by Josep Pla, by some referred to as "obsessed with Carlism". The theme is frequently featured in his discursive writings, yet also in fiction – e.g. in Un senyor de Barcelona (1951); he portrayed it "com un tret important de la nostra historia i com un antecedent d'un determinat corrent dins el catalanisme".

=== Poets ===
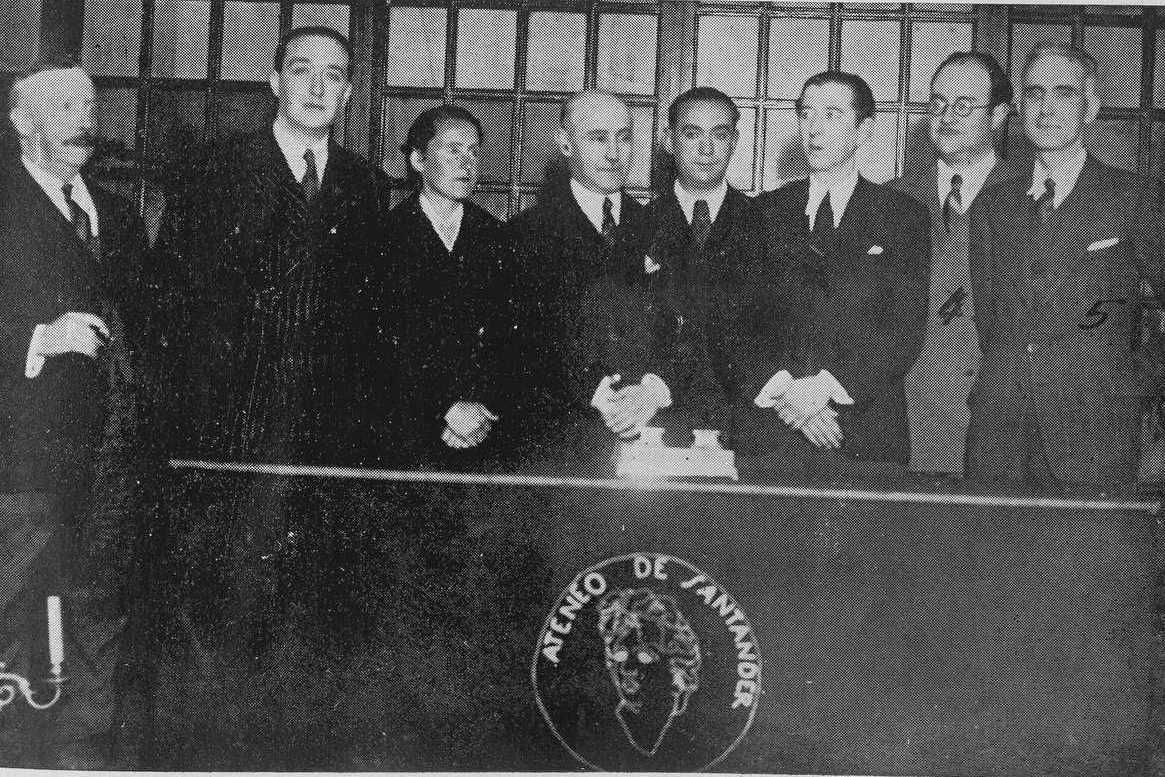
Romero Raizábal

In poetry José Bernabé Oliva released, among prosaic attempts, Hispánica: Romancero de Mío Cid y otros poemas (1942), but his contribution is dwarfed – at least in numerical terms – by poems of Manuel García-Sañudo, who kept writing since the 1910s; his poetic volumes Las razones de Alonso Quijano (1941), El dolor de Cádiz (1947), Elogio de Marchena (1951) revolve around traditional themes. A straightforward exaltation of Carlism is poetry of a religious, Antonio Sánchez Maurandi, a requete combatant Germán Raguán, the author known for his single poetic collection Montejurra (1957), and this of Maximo Gonzalez del Valle, whose poems – e.g. Elegía de los Requetés (1966) – are scattered across a few volumes. However, it was Ignacio Romero Raizábal who emerged as the best-known clearly Carlist man of belles-lettres of Francoism, especially that he kept publishing until the early 1970s and became sort of a Carlist literary patriarch; apart from novels and non-fiction he used to release also poems, some included in a 1955 anthology of all-time Spanish poetry. An author who remains almost forgotten but whose poetic work is among most-performed ones during official military ceremonies in present-day Spain is Martin Garrido Hernando, who volunteered to Carlist troops during the Civil War at the age of 40. He penned a poem titled Soneto a los Caídos, intended as a lament of the Carlist and Nationalist dead. Over time the poem with accompanying music was accepted by the army and is performed during military funerals. However, the original lyrics have been changed: passages "Inmolarse por Dios" and "servir al Rey" were replaced.

The rising star of poetry was Rafael Montesinos, who as teenager volunteered to requeté. Since the 1940s he regularly kept publishing poetry, which earned him Premio Ateneo de Madrid of 1943 and Premio Ciudad de Sevilla of 1957; during Francoism he released at least 10 volumes: Balada del amor primero (1944), Canciones perversas para una niña tonta (1946), El libro de las cosas perdidas (1946), Las incredulidades (1948), Cuaderno de las últimas nostalgias (1954), País de la esperanza (1955), La soledad y los días (1956), El tiempo en nuestros brazos (1958), La verdad y otras dudas (1967) and Cancionerillo de tipo tradicional (1971). Deprived of clearly Carlist or Traditionalist threads, his poetry is spanned between irony and melancholy. In terms of style he is considered a disciple of a Romantic Sevillan poet Gustavo Adolfo Bécquer, to whom Montesinos dedicated a separate study. However, he is best known as the moving spirit behind La Tertulia Literaria Hispanoamericana, weekly sessions of live poetry; the event was launched in 1952 and has been operating as part of various institutional frameworks; the project outlived Francoism and earned Montesinos prestigious standing especially among the younger generation.

== Contemporary literature ==
The fall of Francoism marked a change in Spanish cultural setting, though it was as late as in the 1990s that the anti-Francoist backlash started to prevail over the previously dominant "let's not get back to this" approach. In terms of the Carlist theme, the literary works fall into two rubrics. The majoritarian one is about Carlism as a setting for adventure stories, usually combined with elements of historical novel, psychology, romance, fantasy, alternative history, horror and so on; historically these works are usually though not always set in the 19th century. Another, the minoritarian one, is part of broadly designed discourse about the Spanish self, with key points of reference set by democratic, tolerant, progressive mindset; these works tend to focus on the 20th century. In none of the above Carlism occupies a central or first-rate position.

=== Literatura juvenil ===
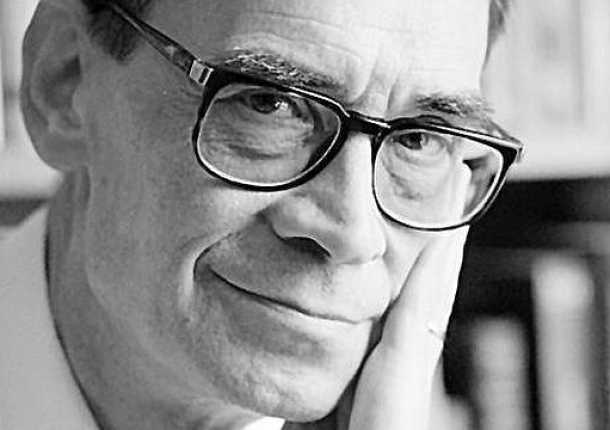
Pujol

Definitely the most popular role of Carlism in contemporary literature is to provide a setting for adventure novels, by some scholars dubbed also "literatura juvenil". The authors "tailor their proposals to the new values within current subgenres for young readers such as mystery, historical novel, books of knowledge, metafiction", with protagonists styled after Zalacaín. The novels continue the adventurous literature of the Francoist era; the difference is that they are increasingly sophisticated and no longer contain veiled Carlist propaganda. In terms of key message they advance praise of general values such as friendship, loyalty, courage, and can hardly be associated with any particular camp, though in some cases, e.g. Atxaga or Landaluce, Carlist protagonists seem to be treated with particular sympathy; they also usually convey more or less explicit message about absurdity of civil wars. They are typically set in the 19th century; the last civil war still appears too sensitive a topic for such a literature.

There are at least 50 novels falling into the genre identified. Among the early ones the titles to be noted are El capitán Aldama by Eloy Landaluce Montalbán (1975) and Un viaje a España by Carlos Pujol (1983), by some considered at the borders of "juvenile literature". Later on subgenres started to emerge. The mainstream one was basically an adventure story: El cementerio de los ingleses by José María Mendiola (1994), Un espía llamado Sara by Bernardo Atxaga (1996), El oro de los carlistas by Juan Bas (2001), En Bayona, bajo las porches by Miguel Sánchez-Ostiz (2002) or Corazón de roble by Emili Teixidor (2003). An example of educative literature for children is Las guerras de Diego by Jordi Sierra i Fabra (2009), Las huellas erradas by Eduardo Iriarte (2010) reveals features of a gothic story, Un carlista en el Pacífico by Federico Villalobos (1999) approaches exercise in alternative history, Veinticinco cartas para una guerra by Arantzazu Amezaga Iribarren (1999) is more of a romance, while El capitán carlista by Gerardo Lombardero (2012) is tilted towards psychology. Some like Sangre de guerrillero by Alain Martín Molina (2016) do not care much about historical detail. The novel of the "literatura juvenil" genre which stands out for clear Traditionalist zeal is Ignacio María Pérez, acérrimo carlista, y los suyos by Maria Luz Gomez (2017); it follows the history of 6 generations, from the First Carlist War to the post-Franco era. Somewhat similar is Heterodoxos de la causa by Josep Miralles Climent (2001), a novel written by a Partido Carlista militant; it traces a Carlist Castellón family across the last 100 years. Beyond Spain Carlism lost its appeal as a literary theme and is almost absent. One exception is a "transpossible" novel The Flame is Green by R.A. Lafferty (1971), at times categorized as science fiction and at times as Christian literature; another is Viva Zumalakarregui! by Valentino Pugliese (2009), more of a typical adventure prose.

=== Historical novel ===
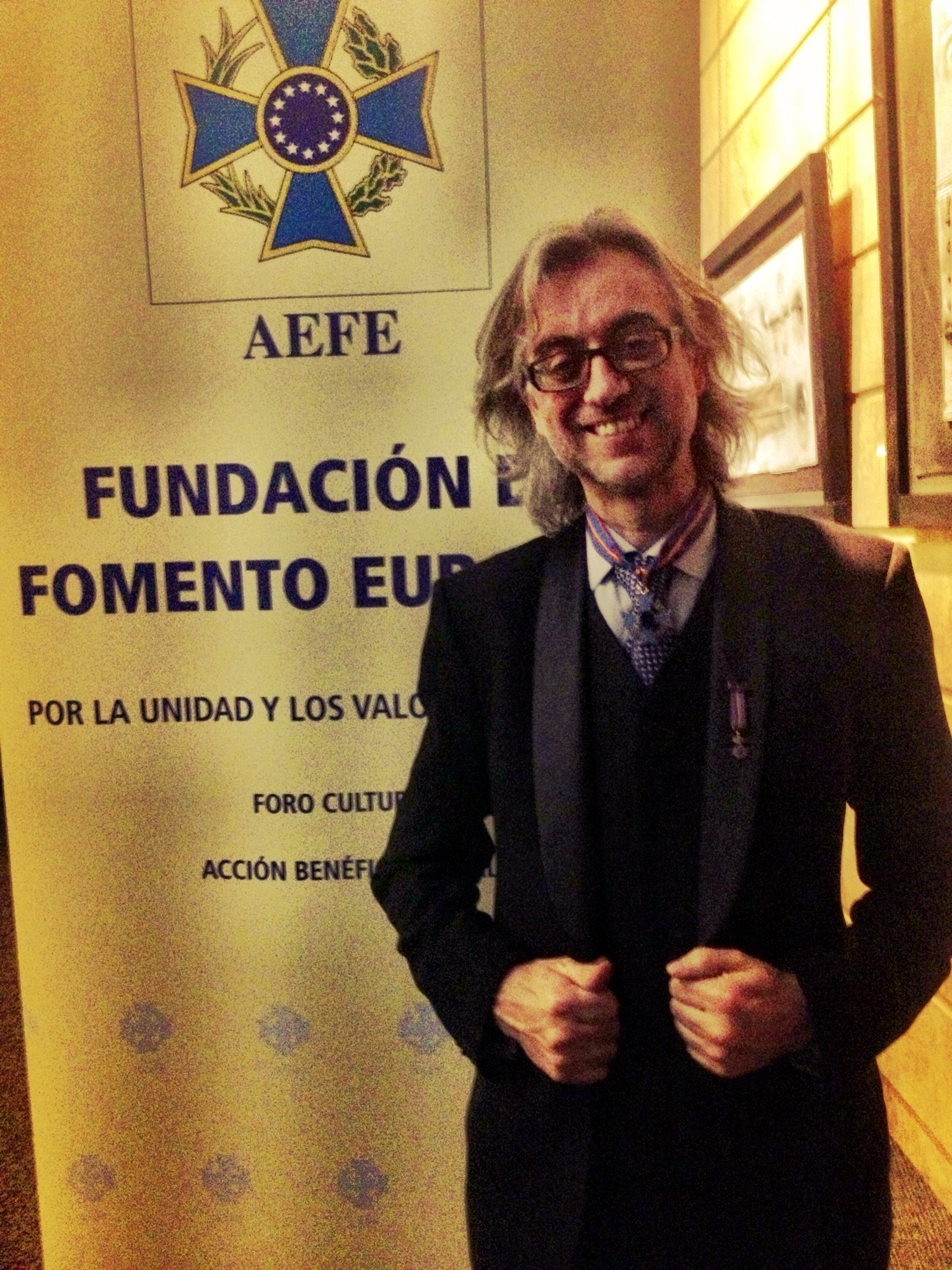
Amela

There is a group of novels which might be classified as falling into the adventure genre, yet they stand out because they focus on historical detail, feature – at times extensively or as key protagonists – historical figures, and their authors seem concerned with historical analysis rather than with offering an interesting plot. The borderlines cases are Galcerán, el héroe de la guerra negra by Jaume Cabré Fabré (1978) and La filla del capità Groc (La hija del capitán Groc) by Víctor Amela (2016), both awarded literary prizes. Focused on Carlist commanders Jeroni Galceran and Tómas Penarrocha they offer perhaps too much of psychology and brutality for a typical adventure story; the latter was compared to La Punyalada and criticized for excessive Carlist zeal. There is a number of novels focused on Ramón Cabrera, some offering original perspectives. El tigre rojo by Carlos Domingo (1990) is styled as unorthodox homage to a free man, always willing to pursue his convictions regardless of political circumstances; hailing late departure of Cabrera from the legitimist path, by no means can it be considered an orthodox Carlist lecture. A blend of erudition and creativity is El testamento de amor de Patricio Julve by Antón Castro (1996). El rey del Maestrazgo by Fernando Martínez Lainez (2005) focuses on last days of the general and this is also the case of El invierno del tigre: la aventura vital del héroe carlista Ramón Cabrera by Andreu Carranza (2006), both works calibrated as psychological analysis. La bala que mató al general by Ascensión Badiola (2011) is focused on Zumalacárregui. None of the claimants, especially the picturesque and charismatic Carlos VII, has attracted attention of the present-day authors.

Noticias de la Segúnda Guerra Carlista by Pablo Antoñana (1990) reflects the Unamunian attempt to follow "the inner history" made by the mute masses and adheres to the theory of two Carlisms, the popular one and the elitist one. It repeats also the Unamunian error of taking at face value the alleged Marx's praise of Carlism. It is seen as delivering the pessimistic vision of civil warfare as intrinsic part of Spanish history and follows Antoñana's earlier works related to the Carlist theme, especially Relato cruento (1978); the novel - awarded Premio Navarra de novela corta - tells a story of a few generations of Arrizibita family, spanning the period between the 1830s and the 1930s. La flor de la Argoma by Toti Martínez de Lezea (2008), the author specializing in juvenile literature, is this time intended for mature audience and is a symbolic discourse on paroxysms of ideology. El médico fiel by Antonio Villanueva (2010) depicts the First Carlist War in terms of horrors of the armed conflict, while La sima by José María Merino (2009) is a bit more typical lament of casualties of fratricidal wars. El baró d’Herbes by Antonio Calero Picó (2001) is a case of extreme erudite knowledge – this one about Maestrazgo – prevailing over narrative skills of the author.

=== Literature on 1936–1939 Civil War ===
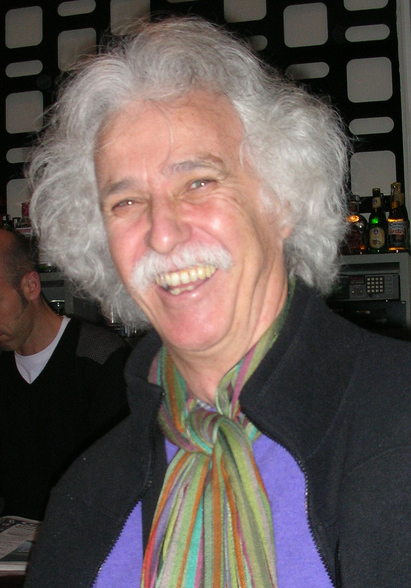
Irigoien

The Spanish Civil War is immensely popular as a setting for contemporary narrative prose and as a matter of literary discourse. There were thousands of related fiction titles published in Spain since the fall of Francoism; in the 21st century only there were 1,248 such works which appeared on the market. Many of them do not feature Carlist motives at all. Many novels contain only marginal Carlist motives, supposed merely to add authenticity to the plot; some like El ultimo invierno by Raúl Montilla (2012) can be reconciled against historiography, some like El jinete polaco by Antonio Muñoz Molina (1991) can be not. In some novels Carlism appears as a thing of the past, which contributed to sectarian divisions within the society, to be shaken off by the protagonists; this is the case e.g. of the novels by Miguel Delibes, like Las guerras de nuestros antepasados (1975) or Madera de héroe (1987). The only Spanish novelist awarded the Nobel Prize in literature, Camilo José Cela, set most of his Mazurca para dos muertos during the 1936–1939 civil war; the Carlist thread is almost absent, save for few comments and one marginally mentioned historical figure, María Rosa Urraca Pastor, who receives her share of ridicule no larger than that reserved for other protagonists. Scholarly works on the last civil war as reflected in the Spanish literature either do not mention Carlism or mention it only marginally.

Novels where Carlism is granted more than a negligible role are few. It is moderately present in Herrumbrosas lanzas by Juan Benet (1983), an extraordinary and monumentally epical volume which if only because of its sheer size offers numerous comments on Carlism. Not exactly the same scale yet not that different approach is demonstrated in Poliedroaren hostoak by Joan Mari Irigoien Aranberri (1983), a vision of recent history of the Basque region told as tale about two families, a Carlist and a Liberal one; written in Euskara, it was awarded a number of prizes. Gironella published the 4th novel of his epic series, Los hombres lloran solos (1986), and Carlist characters he created 25 years earlier assumed a somewhat post-Francoist shape. Verdes valles, colinas rojas by Ramiro Pinilla (2004–2005) advances the thesis that once commenced, the wars never end; the protagonist to prove the point is a Carlist priest padre Eulogio del Pesebre, obsessed with visions of conflict and revenge. El requeté que gritó Gora Euskadi by Alberto Irigoyen (2006) is written by an Uruguayan descendant of a requeté; portrayed as key protagonist of the novel, the Carlist ex-combatant realizes injustice of the war. The novel most hostile to Carlism is probably Antzararen bidea by Jokin Muñoz (2008), which repeatedly refers to anti-Republican repression, exercised in Navarre by the Carlists. Its Manichean personalities are representative for "novela do confrontacion historica", penned by young authors who construct their own identity by means of "acto afiliativo" versus the Republican combatants. La enfermera de Brunete by Manuel Maristany (2007) is an example of adventure-romance genre, unusually featuring a Carlist as its key protagonist. Sort of a milestone is En el Requeté de Olite by Mikel Azurmendi (2016); it is the first novel identified which clearly and with no reservations sympathizes with a Carlist because he is a Carlist. Celebrated in Carlism-flavored groupings it drew heavy fire from many other sides.

=== Drama and poetry ===
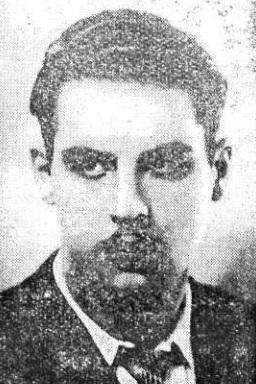
Jaime del Burgo

The Carlist theme has almost entirely disappeared from drama, yet one theatrical piece merits attention: Carlismo y música celestial by Francisco Javier Larrainzar Andueza (1977) offered the author's vision of Carlist history; it climaxed in almost byblical confrontation of two brothers from the Carlist dynasty, Carlos Hugo and Sixto. The very latest work is Bake lehorra/La paz esteril by Patxo Telleria (2022), a play built around so-called Convenio de Amorebieta of 1872; it is structured as a 3-level discourse about responsibility and suffering during "guerra civil vasca".

Jaime del Burgo, who launched his career as a poet in 1937, parted the poetic muse for the next 50 years; he dedicated himself to prose and historiography. By the end of his life he returned to drama with Llamada sin respuesta (1978) and to poetry with Soliloquios: en busca de un rayo de luz perdido (1998). The old former requeté, now almost blind, ostracized and personally accused of being a murderer, has given himself to bitterness and melancholy as certified by titles of the works quoted. Efrain Canella Gutiérrez, not very much younger than del Burgo and also an active Carlist, fathered poetry, stories and novels flavored with Traditionalism yet evading Carlist threads, like Balada del sargento Viesca (2009). Few of his verses, however, are fairly explicit in their political militancy. This is especially the case of El Quijote carlista, a poem which gained sort of iconic status in the Carlist realm and is itself – like in case of del Burgo's late poems – a demonstration of pessimism if not defeatism among the Carlists. Carlist theme has barely surfaced in poems of a Pamplona party activist and editor, María Blanca Ferrer García.

A place of his own in the realm of poetry was already held by Rafael Montesinos; after the fall of Francoism he published Último cuerpo de campanas (1980), De la niebla y sus nombres (1985), Con la pena cabal de la alegría (1996), Madrugada de Dios (1998) and La vanidad de la ceniza (2005). The Tertulia Literaria Hispanoamericana he launched and animated since 2005 are named La Tertulia Literaria Hispanoamericana Rafael Montesinos and are still held weekly, usually in Madrid on Tuesdays. A different chord is struck with Luis Hernando de Larramendi, the third in sequence from a dynasty of Carlist authors. Since his 40s he had been publishing poetic volumes; Traditionalist zeal is more than explicit in his latest collection, Fronda Carlista (2010), much of its content dedicated to Carlist kings and leaders. The leader of Comunión Tradicionalista Carlista, Javier Garisoain, is also a poet; some of his poems advance explicit Carlist themes and threads. A Navarrese Carlist poet in the Basque bertsolari tradition is Pello Urquiola Cestau, author of Nere hitze bertsoatan (2007) and Kanka, kanka, kanka (2014).

The author whose poetic contribution to the Carlist cause is by many considered of greatest literary value – not only in terms of contemporary poetry but in terms of 200 years of Carlist history – came from a somewhat unexpected side. José Antonio Pancorvo was a Peruvian author of various prosaic volumes, yet he gained recognition for his unique poetry, considered baroque or neo-baroque in terms of style and millenarian, mystic and prophetic in terms of breadth. His volume Boinas rojas a Jerúsalem (2006) combines unique technique with militant Carlist zeal; the volume was dedicated to Comunión Tradicionalista and Sixto Enrique de Borbón.

== Gallery ==
Some Carlism-related Books

== See also ==
- Carlism
- Spanish literature
