= FesTVal =

Festival of Television

FesTVal is the main Spanish annual television and radio festival which takes place in the city of Vitoria-Gasteiz in the Basque Country of northern Spain. The festival, an initiative of the Asociación Cultural Fila 2, began in 2009 and runs during the first week of September. The festival program features previews of new shows, special screenings, roundtable discussions, and a ceremony where the Joan Ramón Mainat and Crítics' prizes are awarded. The event is hosted by EITB, the Basque Country public broadcast service. Participating Spanish television and radio networks include TVE, Antena 3, Cuatro, Telecinco, La Sexta, Canal+, and the Disney Channel.

== Tributes ==
FesTVal's organization and his family decided to put this name to the awards given in this festival, to make a tribute to Joan Ramón Mainat.

The journalist Jose Ramon Mainat, died in 2004, was a creative and executive producer of Gestmusic. He was born in Mataró (Barcelona) in 1951 and he studied Philosophy and Literature at the University of Barcelona. During his youth he took part in the music festivals' organizations (SIS Hours of Canzó, Canet Rock).

He had worked for El Noticiero Universal, El Correo Catalán, World Journal, Tele / Express, and Catalunya Express. He was also director of programs of Radio Nacional de España and TVE in Catalonia, in charge of programming of Tele-Expo and creative director of the backstage production. In 1996 it started at Gestmusic as the creative producer. Once there he took part in the creation of Operación triunfo, Crónicas marcianas, Lluvia de estrellas, Esos locos bajitos, Moros y cristianos, Un siglo de canciones, La parodia nacional, Canciones de nuestra vida, among many other programs.

Due to his excellent career as a successful vision, the creativity and production for the television, the organization decided to put his name to the awards given.

== Participants ==
The festival of television and radio in Vitoria-Gasteiz is opened to all the channels, both radio and television, who wish to participate in it. Of time, in this three editions, all of them have participated, as well as Canal+, Clan TVE, FOX, Paramount Comedy and BIO.

EITB, the host channel of the event and the organizer of all the events done during the festival time, is also included in the contest.

== Awards ==
As the main objective of the festival is to raise awareness of new products, the organization has decided not to make a contest for the Prime Time Premieres of the various television programs. However, it has organized a panel of renowned names in television criticism and analysis that will award prizes to the best programs and professionals in the middle of the last season (September 2010 to June 2011).

The awards will be given on September 3, during the Gala at the Teatro Principal in Vitoria-Gasteiz. It will also be given the "EiTB Saria.

The jury, for the last two years have been: Ramón Colom, Victor M. Amela, Juan Cuz, Pepe Colubi, Rosa Belmonte...

== First edition (2009) ==
- Program 'Revelation of the year': Samanta Villar for "21 días"
- Program 'Interesting': "23-F: el día mas difícil del rey"
- Program 'Fun': "Muchachada Nui"
- Program 'Current': "Callejeros"
- Drama series: "Águila roja"
- Comedy: "Doctor Mateo"
- Joan Ramon Mainat awards: Joan Ramon Mainat, María Teresa Campos and Pepe Domingo Castaño

== Second edition (2010) ==
- Best product of the year: "Gran reserva"
- More interesting space: "Redes" Eduard Punset
- Space that more reflects today: "Reporteros Cuatro. REC" Jon Sistiaga
- Fun spaces: "El Intermedio" and "La hora de José Mota"
- The discovery of the year: the drama series "Los Protegidos"
- Joan Ramon Mainat awards: Jesús Vázquez, Julia Otero and 'Gran Hermano'

== Third edition (2011) ==
- Best product of the year: "Crematorio"
- More interesting space: "La mitad invisible"
- Space that more reflects today: Ana Pastor
- Fun spaces: "La que se avecina"
- The discovery of the year: fiction series "Hispania"
- Special mention of the jury as entertainment: "Atrapa un millón"
- Joan Ramon Mainat awards: Matías Prats, Ana Rosa Quintana and Luis del Olmo

== See also ==
- List of television festivals
