= Domingo Cirici Ventalló =

Spanish novelist, editor & political militant (1878-1917)

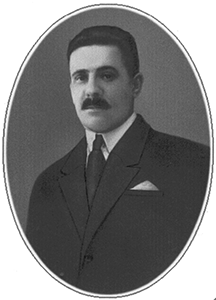
- Born: Domingo Cirici Ventalló; 1878; Terrassa, Spain
- Died: 1917 (aged 38–39); Madrid, Spain
- Known for: novelist, editor
- Political party: Carlism

Domingo Cirici Ventalló (1878–1917) was a Spanish novelist, editor and political militant. During his lifetime he gained wide popularity as author of 4 novels; currently classified as political fiction or dystopian prose, they are considered second-rate literature. His best known work La República española en 1.91... (1911) fairly accurately predicted the advent of the Republic, its sectarian politics, collapse of public order and the ensuing military coup. As a journalist Cirici contributed to some 30 Conservative and Catholic dailies, but is best known as editor-in-chief of El Correo Español and briefly the key author of El Debate. Politically Cirici remained a Carlist; he advanced the Traditionalist outlook both in his novels and in his press work, though he did not hold any post in the party and his attempts to obtain a seat in the Cortes ended in failure.

== Family and youth ==
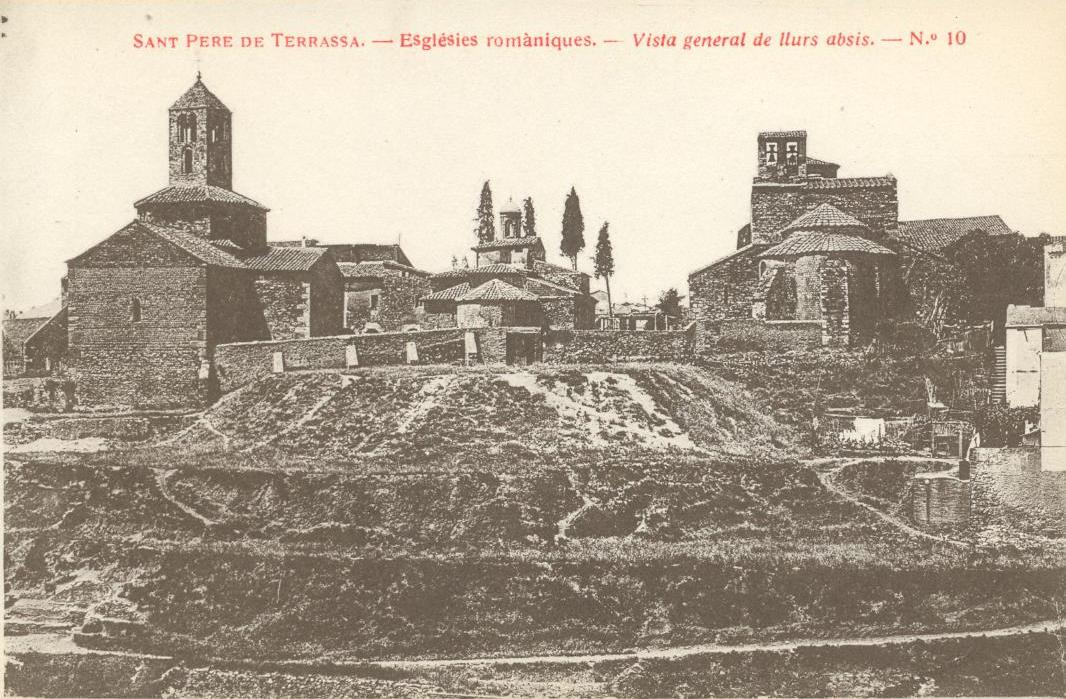
Terrassa, around 1901

There is little known about paternal ascendants of Cirici Ventalló; the Cirici family has not been recorded until the 19th century, when some of its representatives were noted in Northern Catalonia. The father of Domingo, Matías Cirici Traver (1837–1912), originated from Seu d'urgell; It is not clear what he was doing for a living; in later official documents he was recorded as "propietario". He was son to a commerciant Bartomeu Cirici Joval. In 1875 he married Vicenta Ventalló Vintró, descendant to a prestigious local family. Her father and the maternal grandfather of Cirici Ventalló, Domingo Ventalló Llobateras (1805–1878), was a Terrassa pharmacist and served as alcalde of the town, the role performed at the turn of the centuries also by one of his sons. Author of a few works on hydrology, Ventalló Llobateras was also the leader of local conservative Catholics.

The newly wed Matías and Vicenta settled in Terrassa, though either in the late 1880s or early 1890s they moved to Barcelona. They had 6 children, 3 daughters and 3 sons. Domingo was raised in a pious Catholic ambience and educated in Real Colegio Tarrasense, an establishment catering to local bourgeoisie. None of the sources consulted indicates whether he entered a university or graduated; since his early teens he contributed to local periodicals and when in 1897 he settled on his own in Barcelona it was because he commenced professional career as a journalist. Cirici Ventalló got married in 1900 at an unusually early age of 22. The bride, María de la Concepción Babé Botana (1882–1971), was even younger; almost nothing is known about her family or herself, except that she has outlived her husband by 54 years.

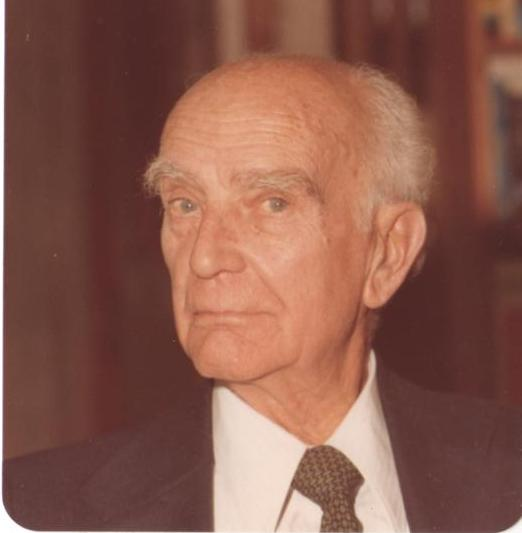
Joaquín Ventalló Vergés

Domingo and Concepción settled in Barcelona. They had 5 children, born between 1903 and 1916: Matías, Domingo, Carmen, Ana and Francisco; Ana died at the age of 5 in 1921. Matías Cirici Babé earned his name as a screenwriter contributing to Hollywood films of the 1930s and Spanish ones of the early 1940s; until the 1970s he worked for a popular weekly Ya, periodically heading its foreign section; in both roles he appeared as "Matías Cirici-Ventalló". Another son Domingo tried his hand as historian of Latin American literature; he signed as "Domingo Cirici Ventalló". The granddaughter of Cirici Ventalló, Carmen Cirici-Ventalló Aguayo, earned her name in Mexico as music producer, painter, sculptor and translator, but also as wife of Eduardo Mata. Among other relatives Domingo's brother-in-law, Andrés Babé Botana, was moderately popular as an actor, known as "Mellaíto". Domingo's maternal uncles José Ventalló Vintró and Pedro Antonio Ventalló Vintró were acknowledged in the local Terrassa ambience, the former as a historian and the latter as a poet, "Cantor d’Egara". Two of his maternal step-cousins became known in Catalan literature in politics. Joaquín Ventalló Vergés was a Catalan poet, translator and Esquerra Republicana politician, while Lluis Ventalló Vergés was a Carlist militant and the first Francoist civil governor or the Lerida province.

== Periodista ==
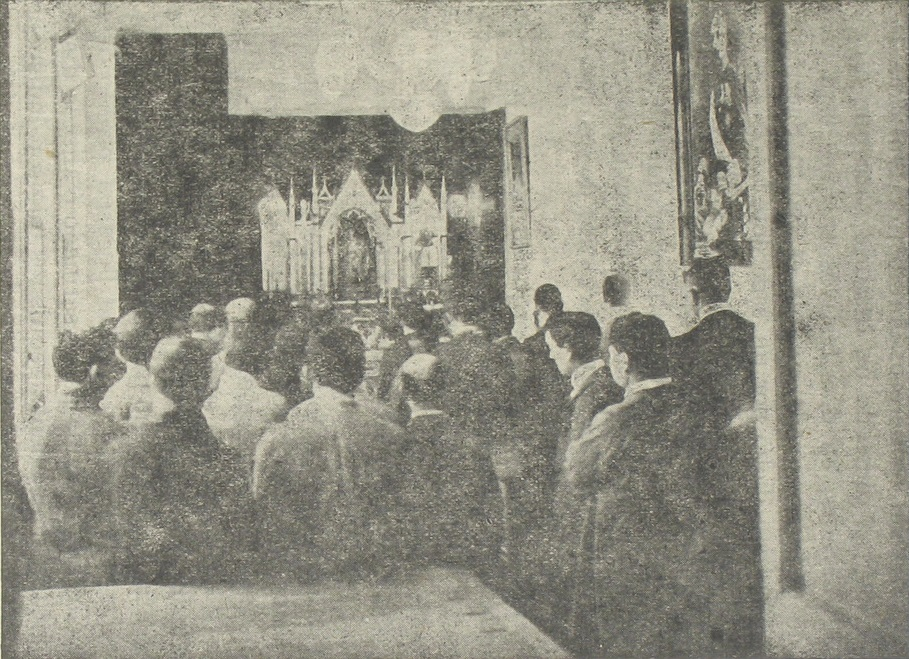
El Correo Español staff during a private mass, 1915

Inspired by literary endeavors of his uncles the young Domingo was also tempted by letters. He commenced his career as teenager by contributing to La Comarca del Vallès, issued by José Ventalló. In 1897 he started co-operation with the Barcelona dailies Las Noticias and El Noticiero Universal. His first signed contribution identified is an 1899 chronicle published in the Carlist Barcelona daily La Dinastía, though the same year he contributed lyrical prose to a Liberal daily La Lucha. Throughout the next few years Cirici worked also for Barcelona newspapers El Correo Catalan and La Veu, for a weekly Mar y Tierra and for provincial dailies Diario de Tortosa and La Situación. He published little under his own name; it is not clear whether he used pen-names. According to some sources he wrote also in Catalan, yet no such contribution has been identified. He earned some recognition and as representative of "Catalan press" he covered local meetings involving Spanish politicians; he also entered the executive of Asociación de la Prensa de Barcelona. Already recognized for vehemently right-wing views, in 1907 he was about to have a duel with his preferred bête noire, Alejandro Lerroux.

At unspecified time between 1907 and 1909 Cirici moved to Madrid. According to some sources, he was invited either by the veteran Carlist publisher Salvador Morales Marcén or by the Traditionalist ideologue Juan Vázquez de Mella, who offered him a job in the unofficial Carlist mouthpiece, El Correo Español. In 1910 latest Cirici joined its staff and specialized in coverage of parliamentarian debates; the section he invented and ran, Del Mentidero, mocked the deputies and became enormously popular among readers; it was continued until 1914. Apart from other editorial work Cirici worked as envoy covering major events, e.g. the legitimist coup in Portugal; minor pieces were published with a pen-name "Cirvent". Already in 1913 he was considered as a potential chief editor; he assumed the job and became second-in-command in Correo in 1916, when he also started to publish editorials.

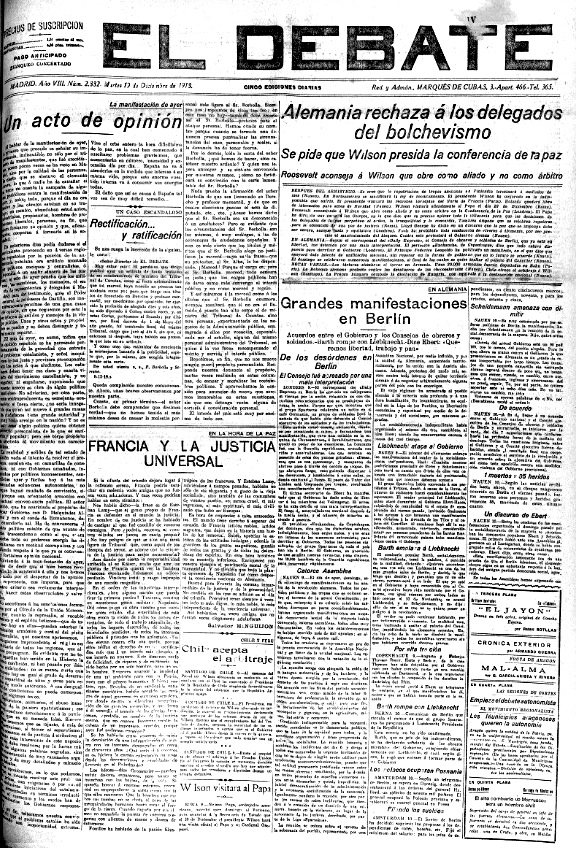
El Debate

Apart from his Correo assignment in the 1910s Cirici contributed to many mostly provincial and usually Carlist, conservative or at least Catholic dailies, especially Diario de Valencia and El Norte from Girona; the others were La Independencia from Almería, El Restaurador from Tortosa, El Pueblo Manchego from Ciudad Real, La Gaceta de Tenerife, Heraldo Alaves, El bien público from Mahón and La Tradición from Tortosa; less frequently his writings appeared in at least 20 other titles and in papers published in Latin America. In 1912–1913 he also managed ephemeral satirical weeklies El Mentidero and El Fusil. Already as a star of journalism starting 1917 Cirici signed an exclusive contract with El Debate and almost ceased publishing elsewhere. Though still redactor-jefe of Correo, he became the most recognized pen of Herrera Oria's newspaper; apart from commentaries he worked as envoy and interviewed key politicians, e.g. Antonio Maura. Last but not least, Cirici became one of key persons behind the Madrid professional corporation, Prensa Asociada.

== Novelist ==
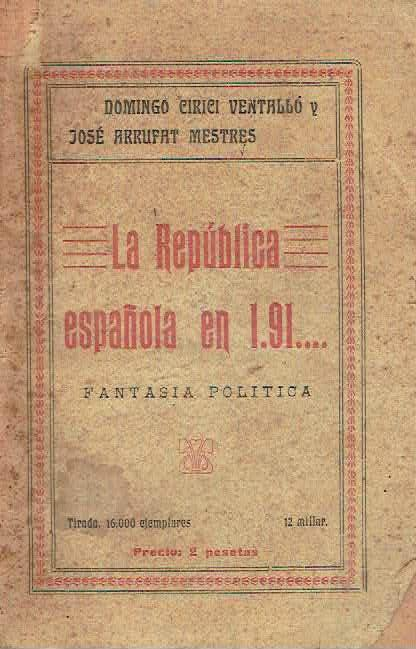
cover of La República española en 1.91...

In 1911 Cirici and José Arrufat Mestres released La República española en 1.91..., the novel next year followed – this time authored by Cirici only – by sort of a sequel, Memorias de Muñoz Villena. Both books were political pamphlets aimed against the Left and featured Spain of the near future. The monarchy was toppled and replaced with a republic, ran by a republican-socialist coalition; it declared agrarian reform and official atheism, banning public Catholic cult; as growing chaos and separatism produced collapse of public order, a rebellious general staged a coup intended to save the country. The narratives featured numerous real life personalities, usually set in sinister roles of cynical political manipulators: Lerroux, Alvarez, Galdós, Largo Caballero, Weyler, Iglesias, Romanones, Azcárate, Alcalá-Zamora, Besteiro and many others, though the rebel general was a fictitious person. A few episodes might have seemed off-limits, e.g. Galdós as president of the republic was killed in an assassination attempt.

Following commercial success of especially República Cirici adhered to the same genre of political fiction when in 1914 he published El secreto de lord Kitchener. Again a voice in heated public discourse, the novel formed part of ongoing propaganda war about the role of Spain in the First World War. It advanced a vehemently pro-German and anti-British outlook; the novel was formatted as a series of rather loosely related stand-alone chapters, each telling its own story. The narrative followed the future course of the war and ended with total defeat of the Entente; France was overrun, Britain lost almost all its overseas possessions, Germany obtained sort of Gibraltar in Kent and became the unchallenged European might, federated with Belgium and Poland. Among many real-life personalities, also the foreign ones, again Liberal and Republican Spanish politicians were portrayed as lousy, mischievous failures; Kitchener was killed by an outraged suffragette. The novel was a success; moreover, it was promptly translated into German and Swedish.

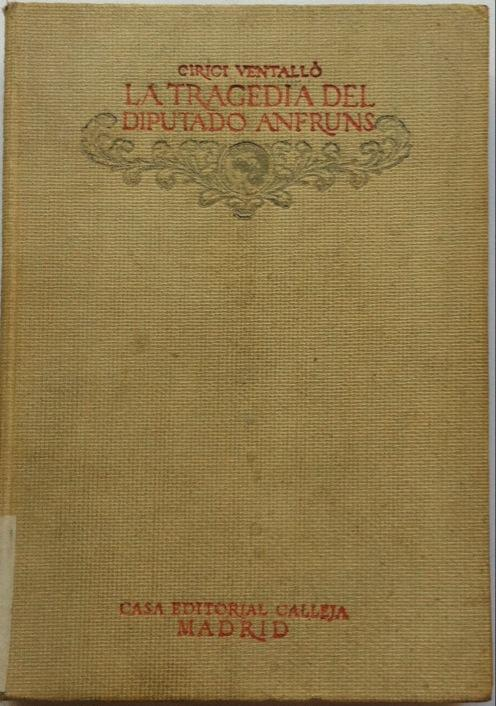
cover of La tragedia del diputado Anfrúns

La tragedia del diputado Anfrúns was first serialized in El Debate from January to May 1917, later that year released also as a book. Cirici remained within the limits of militant political fiction, though this time the plot was set not in the future but in the recent past. The novel focused on Catalonia; Cirici's venom was intended, apart from his usual liberal-republican enemies, also for the Catalanists, all indulging in corruption and caciquismo. The novel tells the story of a young Liberal political hopeful. His cynicism and wit earn him first a place in the Barcelona ayuntamiento and then in the Cortes, let alone millions of a cleverly married girl from a Mexico-based indiano family. However, he is eventually outsmarted by equally cynical collaborators and malicious wife; Anfrúns dies when involved in half-legal war supplies to the French army. Like in Memorias the key protagonist was a fictitious character interfacing mostly with real-life personalities; apart from the customary black characters of Lerroux or Romanones, this time they included many Catalans like Comas y Masferrer, Cambó and Planas y Casals.

== Carlist ==
Carlist standard

Cirici Ventalló descended from the Carlist family and acquired the Traditionalist outlook from his paternal ancestors, and perhaps also maternal relatives. His press career is from the onset marked by militant Carlist zeal, demonstrated in the 1900s in periodicals like La Dinastía, El Correo Catalan or La Veu. He was soon noticed by party pundits and offered to join El Correo Español. Cirici soon became one of the key contributors to the daily, pursuing the legitimist cause also in other party-related papers like El Norte; La Independencia, El Restaurador, or La Tradición. As the propagandist he soon grew to prominence and was privileged to run public conferences of the party leader, Bartolomé Feliú. In 1910 he prepared a lengthy pamphlet hailing the new Carlist king, Don Jaime, whom he met for the first time in person in 1911. The following year he published La Peregrinación de la Lealtad and Biografía de don Jaime de Borbón, the former a set of essays organized around the Carlist rally in Lourdes and the latter the biography of the claimant. Finally, in 1916 he contributed to a massive bibliographic review of Carlist press.

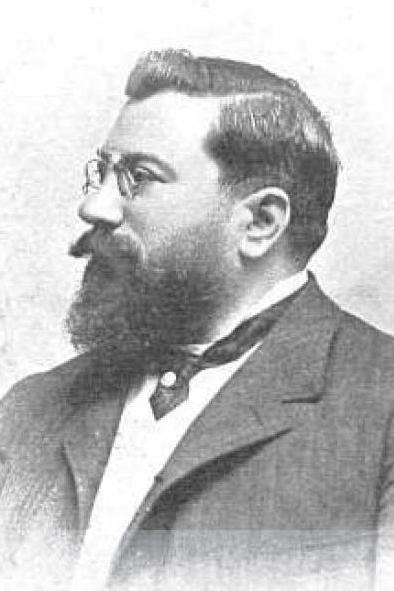
Juan Vazquez de Mella

Cirici a few times unsuccessfully tried to launch a strictly political career. In 1910 he was reported to compete for seat in the Cortes on the Carlist ticket from Valderrobres in Aragón; none of the sources consulted confirms that he indeed ran. In 1914 he did stand as a candidate from Vilademuls; having gained 1749 votes (28% of the total) he decisively lost to a Liberal counter-candidate. In 1916 Cirici renewed his bid, this time as a joint Carlist-Maurist contender from Les Borges; with 1667 votes (20%) he was defeated by Francesc Macía. His candidacy, apparently enforced by the national party executive, caused a minor turmoil in the provincial Lerida jefatura, which objected to both a cuckoo candidate and to the alliance strategy.

Cirici's political activity fell on a period marked by growing paralysis of Carlism, torn by conflict between Vazquéz de Mella and Don Jaime; it very much focused on control of El Correo Español. It is not entirely clear what was the option followed by Cirici. On the one hand, he was brought to the editorial board by de Mella. On the other hand, in 1913 Don Jaime favored him for the post of editor-in-chief against the candidacy of Miguel Peñaflor, advanced and eventually successfully secured by de Mella. None of the sources consulted notes Cirici as involved in the power struggle within the party and in the mid-1910s Peñaflor and Cirici went together well. Moreover, during the Great War Cirici sided with de Mella and assumed a decisively pro-German stand, definitely against the neutralist or pro-Entente leaning of Don Jaime. In case of another thorny issue, the Catalan question, Cirici championed the anti-Catalanist cause and opposed Carlist participation in initiatives like Solidaridad Catalana; some dub him "the father of Catalan españolismo". According to some authors, Cirici was gradually getting lukewarm about the Carlist cause.

== Reception and legacy ==
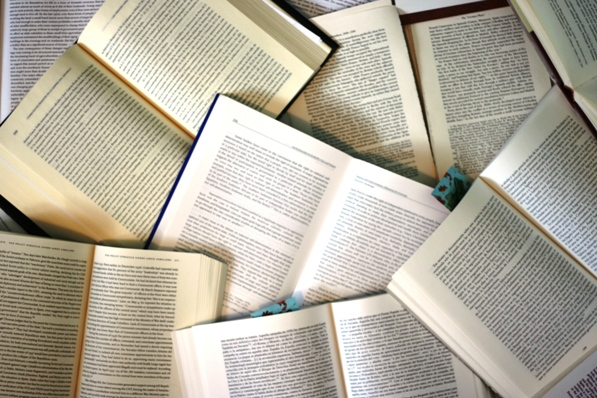

During his lifetime Cirici remained a controversial figure, especially as a journalist. He was hailed by Conservative press as informed and competent commentator, expert on behind-the-scenes parliamentarian deals and "the best journalist in Spain". The Republican and Socialist authors criticized and derided him as "campeón del cinismo"; his vehemence cost him a judicial investigation triggered by a French ambassador and periodical suspension of El Debate, he also became a point of reference for zealous germanophilia. As a novelist he was acclaimed for style and wit, by some declared "una de las más legitimas glorias del humorismo mundial" and the one who introduced political satire to Spain; however, it is difficult to tell opinion of informed literary critics from marketing. Commercially his novels were a success; while the Episodios nacionales Galdós’ books usually sold in 4–5,000 copies, also the usual run of a novel at the time, República sold in 39,000 copies, Memorias in 15,000 copies and Secreto in 20,000 copies, all advertised as "most successful in bookstores in recent times". The German translation of Secreto sold in 40,000 copies. Sales results would have made Cirici a rich man; however, pressed by daily needs he used to sell copyright to the editors.

Cirici's premature death was acknowledged by nationwide press. Many titles launched a charity campaign intended to help the widow and the orphans and Alfonso XIII arranged for his oldest son to be admitted to the college free of charge. In the 1920s he was noted in works on history of Spanish literature as the author of "novelas de satira política con gran conocimiento del asunto, donaire y originalidad"; in 1931, when the Republic was actually declared, some recollected his earlier fiction. Today the favorable opinion held by scholars like Cejador y Frauca does not stand; most historians of literature ignore him and he is relegated to footnotes in works dealing with specific genres. Currently Cirici's novels are usually classified as "ficción utópica", "ficción especulativa", polítical fiction, "extrapolación española" or dystopia, at times praised as "still readable"; in all cases they are noted as second-rate literature. Some suggest he sort of commenced a trend, with Elias Cerdá emerging as his follower in cultivating the genre.

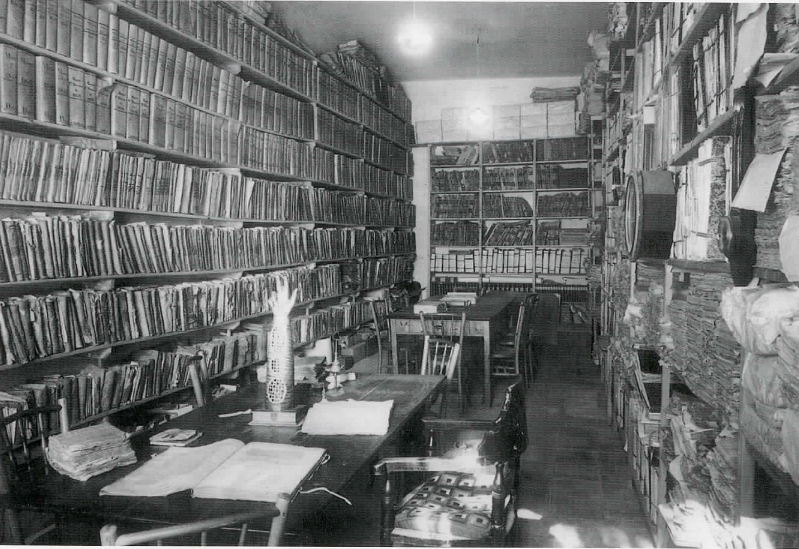
Terrassa, historical archive

Within the Carlist realm Cirici was initially viewed as a potentially great literary herald of the cause; in 1916 he was honored with a dedicated homage session involving the party leader Marques de Cerralbo, the key theorist Vazquéz de Mella and others; many party heavyweights attended his funeral, including de Cerralbo, de Mella Conde de Doña Marina or Marqués de Tamarit. However, he later went into almost total oblivion, except that some scholars claim a Traditionalist historian Melchor Ferrer Dalmau was influenced by Cirici's "españolismo catalan". Rather exceptionally he featured in Carlist propaganda of the 1960s, listed among key party men of letters like Manuel Polo y Peyrolón or Luis Hernando de Larramendi. Locally he is recognized as a noteworthy terrassenc in a biographical sympathetic article and in a limited-circulation 2007 monographic book.

== See also ==
- Carlism
- Traditionalism (Spain)
- Carlism in literature
- Dystopia
