= Laurencin (author) =

French playwright and librettist

- Born: Paul-Aimé Chapelle; 10 January 1806; Beaumont, Calvados, France
- Died: 9 December 1890 (aged 84); Monaco
- Occupations: Playwright, librettist

Laurencin, born Paul-Aimé Chapelle, (10 January 1806 - 9 December 1890) was a French playwright and librettist.

He authored numerous theatre plays, vaudevilles and operettas, most of them in collaboration. Le 66 and Monsieur et Madame Denis by Jacques Offenbach are among the pieces he collaborated on.
