= Wenceslao Ayguals de Izco =

Spanish writer and editor (1801–1873)

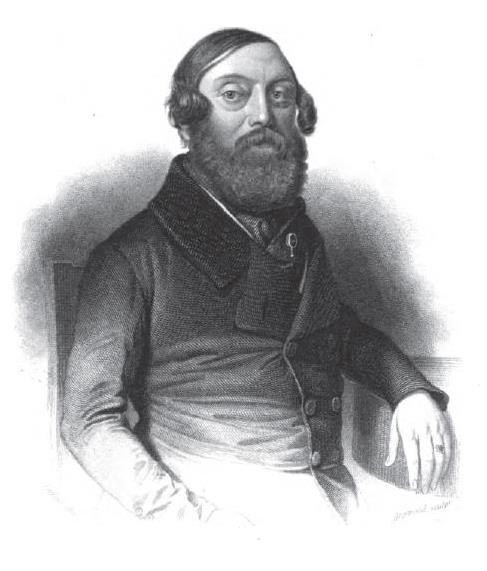
Wenceslao Ayguals de Izco

Wenceslao Ayguals de Izco (Vinaròs, 18 October 1801 – Madrid, 17 January 1873) was a Spanish writer and editor.
