= Galdós =

Galdós (Spanish pronunciation: [ɡalˈdos]) is a Spanish surname. Notable people with the surname include:

- Aitor Galdós (born 1979), Spanish professional road bicycle racer
- Benito Pérez Galdós (1843–1920), Spanish realist novelist
- Francisco Galdós (born 1947), former Spanish professional road racing cyclist
- Sergio Galdós (born 1990), Peruvian professional tennis player
