= Víctor Amela =

Spanish writer and journalist

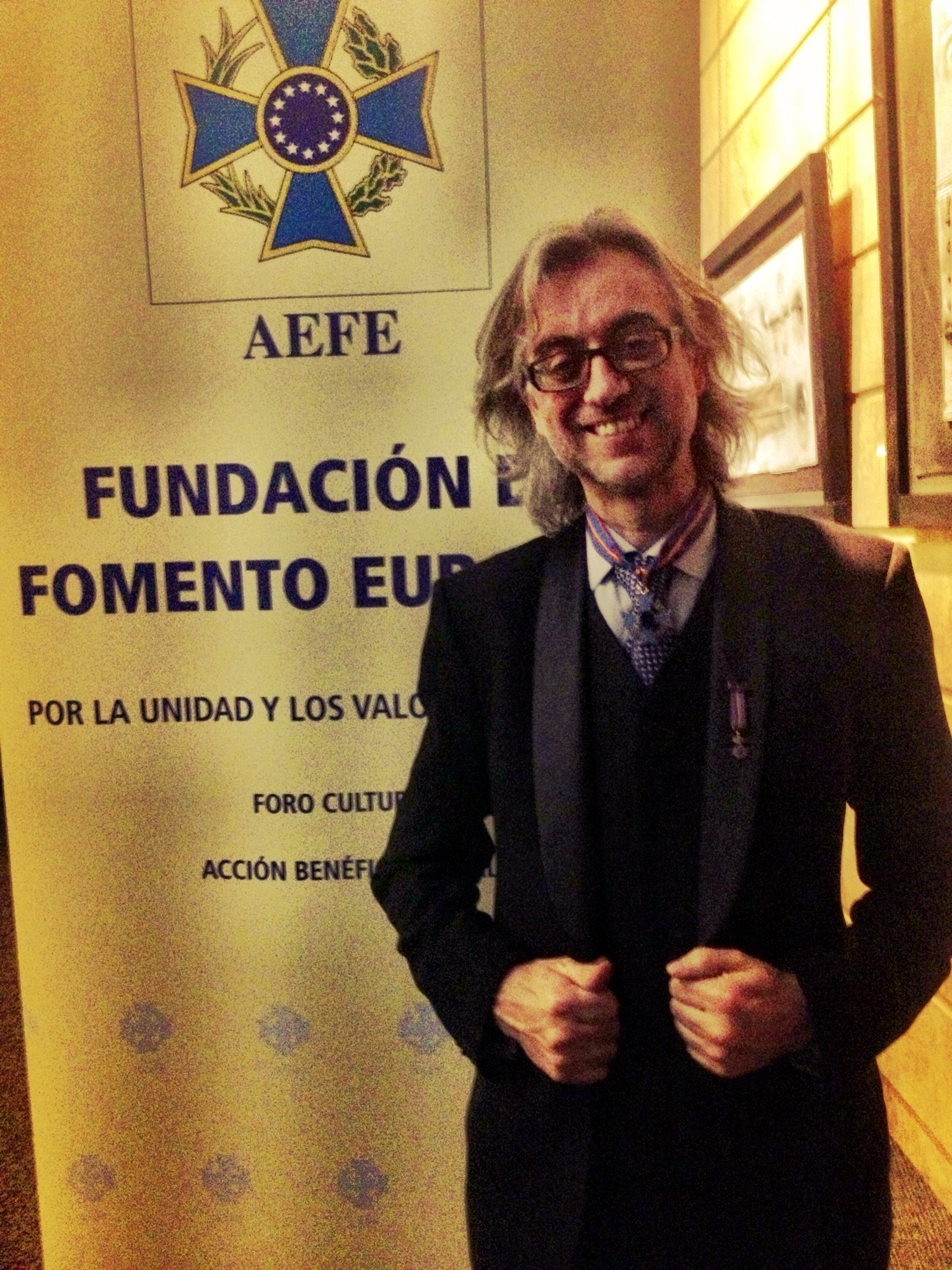
Víctor Amela

Victor Manuel Amela Bonilla, better known as Víctor Amela (Barcelona, 30 September 1960) is a Spanish writer and journalist present in several media. It is one of the co-creators of the section La contra at La Vanguardia, where he has published more than 1,800 interviews in 15 years.

== Published books ==
- Jo hauria pogut salvar Lorca (2018)
- La filla del capità groc (2016) Premi Ramon Llull 2016
- El cátaro imperfecto / El càtar imperfecte (2013)
- Casi todos mis secretos / Tots els meus secrets, o gairebé (2012)
- 333 vitamines per a l'ànima (2012) (with Roser Amills)
- Grandes contras sobre el amor, Grandes contras sobre la mente humana, Grandes contras sobre la felicidad (2012) (with Ima Sanchís & Lluís Amiguet)
- Tombes i lletres
- Paraules d'amor, confessions apassionades (2011) (with Roser Amills)
- Antologia de citas (2010)
- Història cultural de l'audiovisual (2008)
- La televisió-espectacle (2008)
- Retratos y recuerdos de la vida forcallana (2006)
- Algunas cosas que he aprendido (2005)
- La meva ràdio (1993) theme book of the 10th anniversary of Catalunya Ràdio (co-author)
