= Unidad católica de España =

Historic Spanish legal concept

Pillars of Catholic unity of Spain
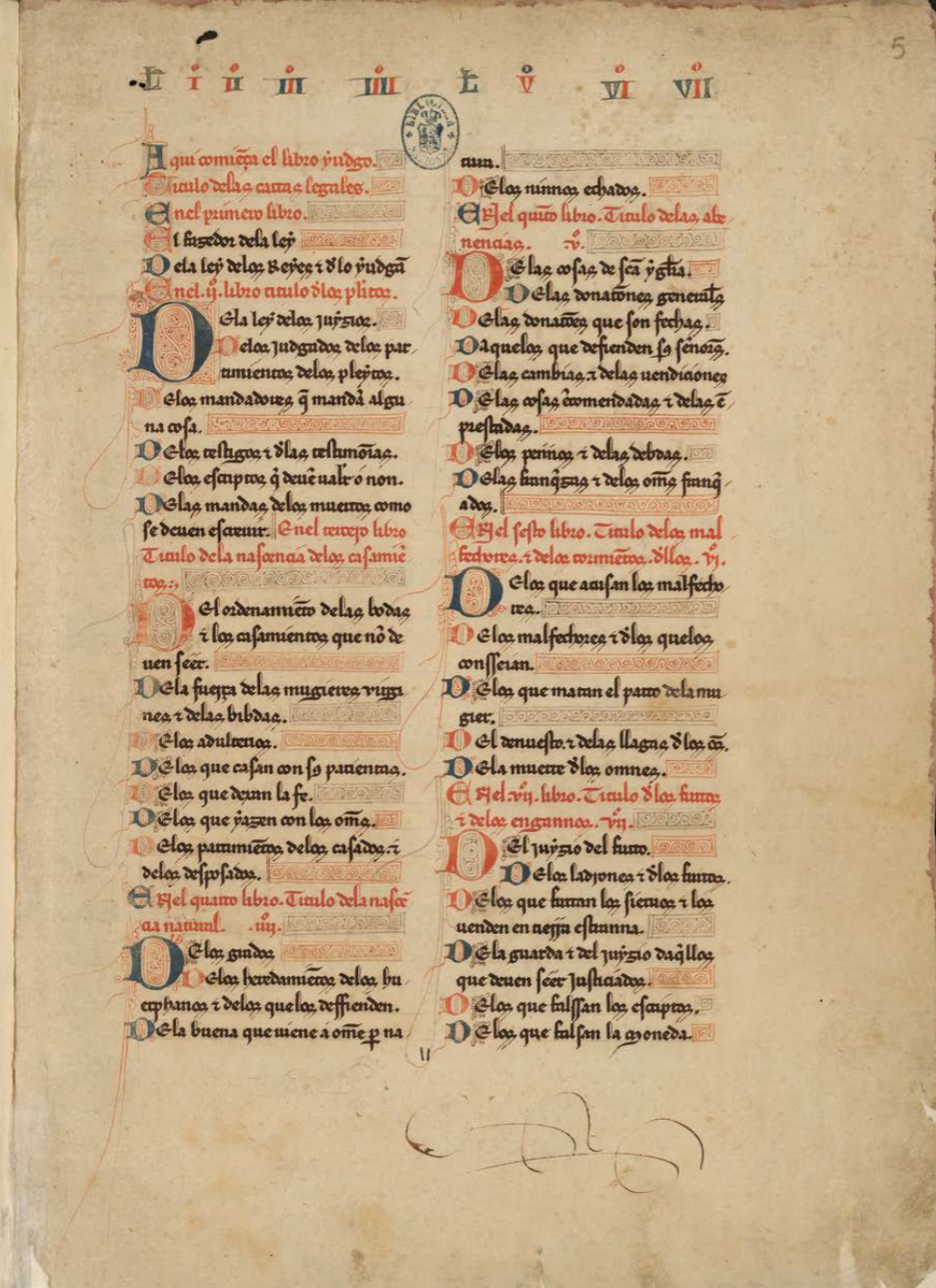
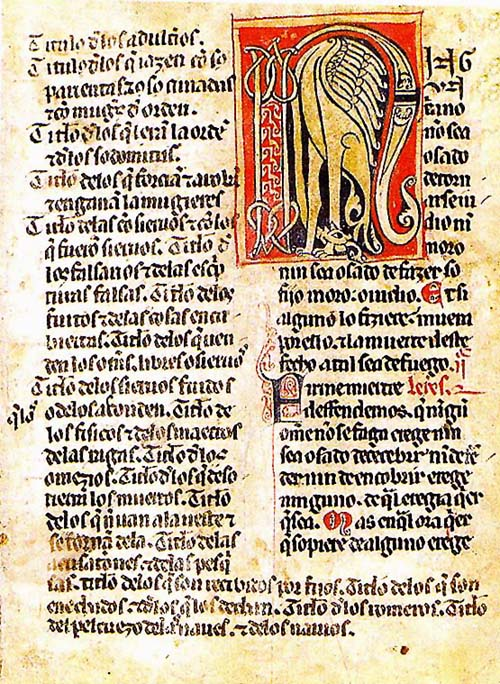
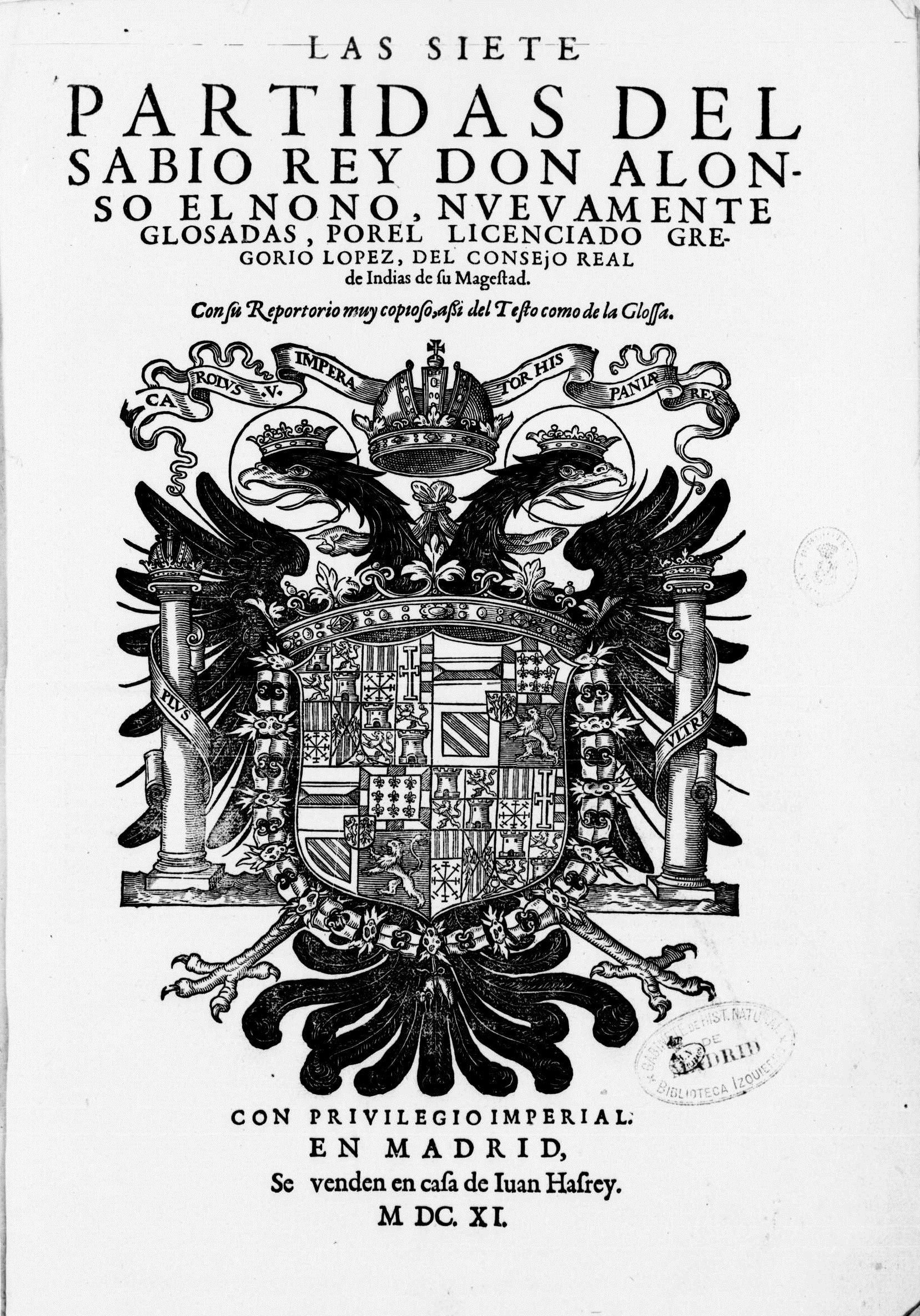
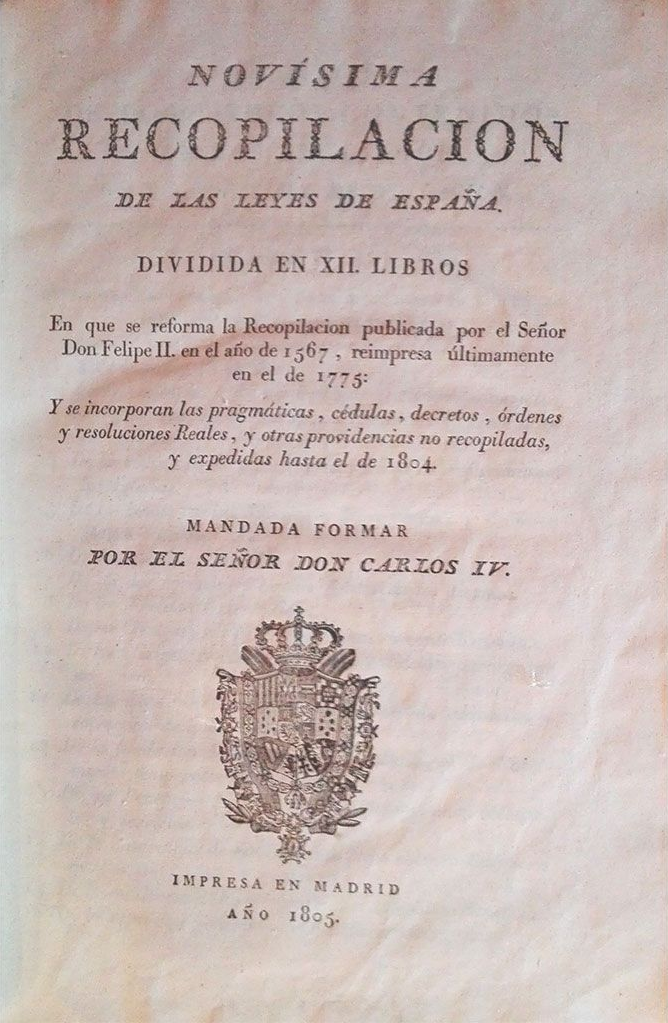
Pages of the Fuero Juzgo (654), the Fuero Real (1255), the Siete Partidas (1265) and the Novísima Recopilación (1805), legal codes whose foundation was the "Law of God" and in which, according to traditionalists, Catholic unity was inscribed as the basis of the Spanish monarchy.

The Unidad católica de España (English: Catholic Unity of Spain) refers to a historical legal and political principle according to which the Catholic Church was recognized as the sole official religion of Spain, to the exclusion of other forms of public worship. Supporters of the principle trace its origins to the Third Council of Toledo in 589. There, the Visigothic king Reccared I renounced Arianism and converted to Catholicism, leading to the establishment of Catholicism as the official religion of the Visigothic Kingdom. The principle of Catholic unity was reflected in Spanish legislation from the time of the Catholic Monarchs until the promulgation of the Spanish Constitution of 1869. It was subsequently reinstated, except during the periods of the Democratic Sexennium and the Second Republic), and remained in force until the adoption of the Law on Religious Freedom of 1967, which recognized a limited right to religious choice.

Opponents of Catholic unity maintained that governments should promote and safeguard what they described as the right to freedom of conscience and the common good. Its defenders, by contrast, argued that Catholic unity was essential to the welfare of Spain and its people, and that it did not prevent the acceptance of non-Catholics provided they respected the Catholic majority.

== Catholic unity in the doctrine of the Church ==
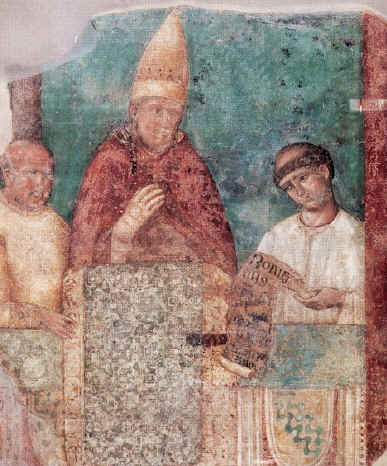
Pope Boniface VIII defined the dogma Extra Ecclesiam nulla salus (outside the Church there is no salvation) in the year 1302.

In 1962, during the first session of the Second Vatican Council, Cardinal Alfredo Ottaviani presented a draft schema affirming the continuity of Catholic teaching on the relationship between the Church and political authority. The text upheld the model of confessional unity as the most appropriate form of cooperation between religion and the state, describing such unity as a primary good and the source of multiple benefits, including temporal ones.

According to this position, Catholic unity implied that civil authority, and not only individuals, should recognize and accept the teachings of the Church. In legislative matters, this entailed adherence not only to natural law but also to divine and ecclesiastical norms intended to guide human beings toward their spiritual fulfillment. Such an arrangement was presented as facilitating a social order inspired by Christian principles and oriented toward the ultimate ends of humanity as understood in Catholic doctrine. A related consequence of this conception was the restriction of public manifestations of other religions, with the justification that the state had a duty to protect citizens from the dissemination of doctrines considered erroneous and potentially harmful to their eternal salvation.

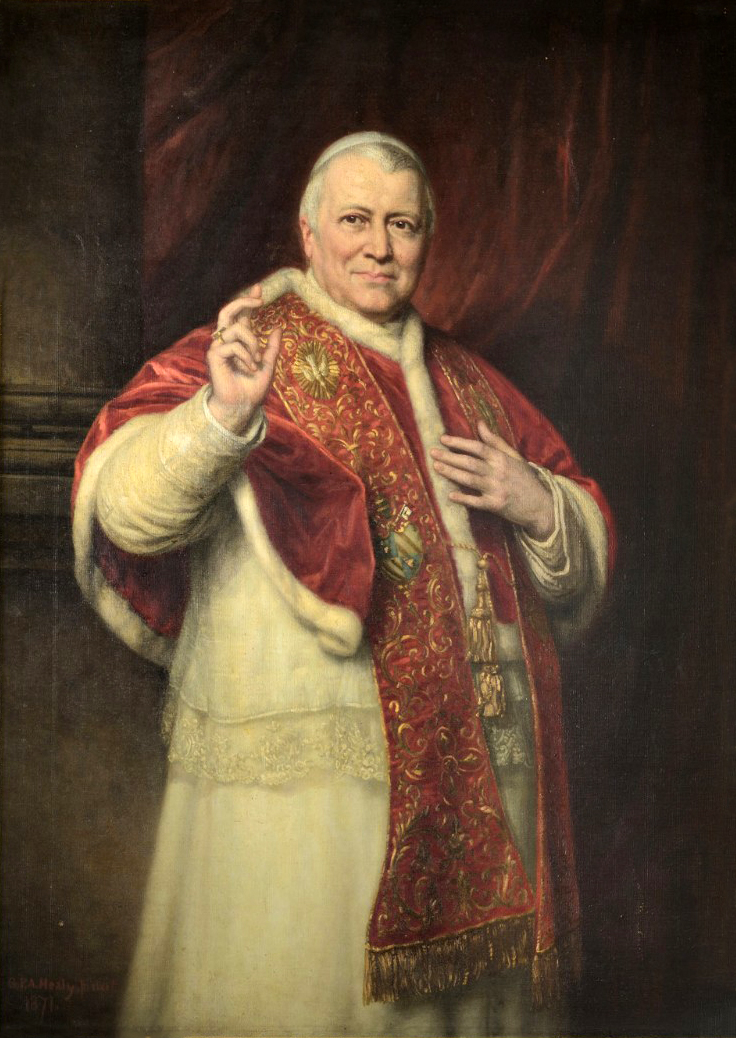
Pope Pius IX, author of the encyclical Quanta cura and the Syllabus of Errors, in which he would condemn "modern errors".

In the 19th century, Pius IX articulated a critique of modern liberal principles in the encyclical Quanta cura and the Syllabus of Errors, in which certain conceptions of religious freedom were condemned. Earlier, Pope Gregory XVI had expressed similar views in the 1832 encyclical Mirari vos. These teachings were reaffirmed in authoritative form by the First Vatican Council, whose doctrinal definitions were binding on Catholics. In Spain, the Archbishop of Toledo, Juan Ignacio Moreno y Maisanove, emphasized the obligation of Catholics to adhere to these papal and conciliar teachings, maintaining that their authority was not diminished by dissent but rather underscored by it.

In his encyclical Immortale Dei (1885), Pope Leo XIII would justify the obligation of States to profess and exclusively favor the Catholic religion in this way:

Just as nobody can be careless when it comes to serving God, the most important thing is to follow the religion wholeheartedly, not the one each person likes, but the one God says is right and which has been proven to be the only true religion. Similarly, countries cannot act as if God did not exist, reject religion as something unnecessary, or choose one religion over another. The opposite is true. The government must allow people to worship God in the way that they believe God wants them to. So it is very important for authorities to respect the holy name of God. Their main jobs are to support religion, defend it effectively, protect it by law, and make sure that laws do not go against it. Rulers also have a duty to their citizens. Because all men have been born and raised to achieve a final and ultimate goal, to which we must refer all our purposes, and which is placed in heaven, beyond the fragile brevity of this life. If this is true, then human happiness is dependent on this supreme good. This means that achieving this good is the most important thing for every citizen. So, the State has to make sure it is working for the good of all its citizens. It should do this by making things easy for people to achieve the best things in life.

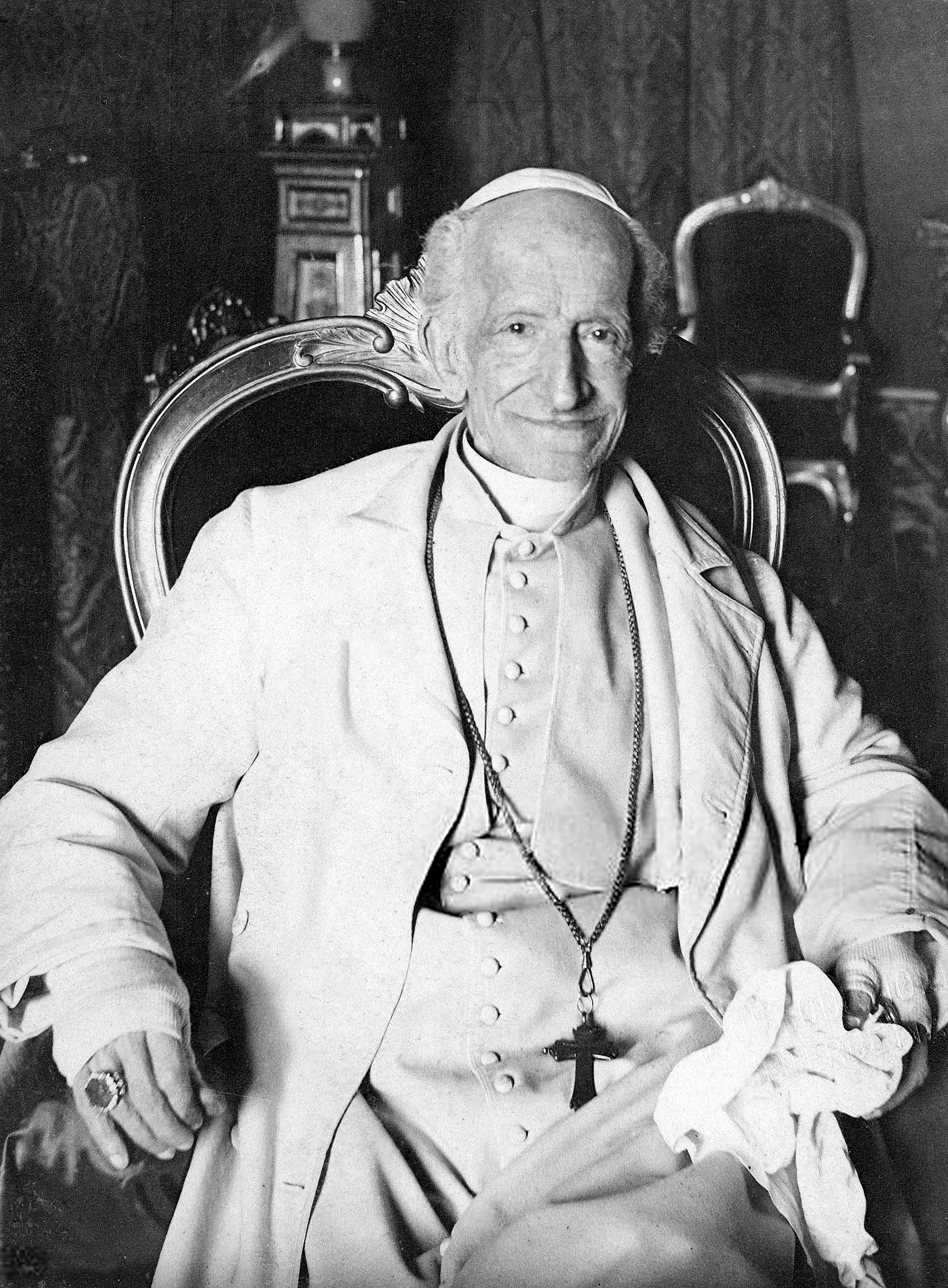
Leo XIII in 1887.

Even so, the Church admitted that in countries with significant religious minorities, for reasons of public utility, the authority might tolerate some "false worship" as a lesser evil, with a view to ensuring peace, or avoiding greater evils. The concept of religious tolerance differed from that of freedom of worship in that such tolerance could sometimes be a necessary evil, but never a good in itself. On this matter Leo XIII would say in his encyclical Libertas (1888):

But we must recognize, if we want to remain within the truth, that the greater the evil that must necessarily be tolerated in a State, the greater the distance separating that State from the best political regime. In the same way, since the tolerance of evil is a postulate proper to political prudence, it must be strictly confined to the limits required by the reason for that tolerance, that is, the public good. For this reason, if tolerance harms the public good or causes greater evils to the State, the consequence is its unlawfulness, because in such circumstances tolerance ceases to be a good.

However, between the end of the 19th century and the beginning of the 20th, there was no shortage of people, even within the Church, who insisted on introducing liberalizing ideas, including that of freedom of worship and that all religions are true by reason of the doctrine of experience, linked to that of symbolism. In his encyclical Pascendi (1907), Pope Pius X condemned these tendencies, which he would label as Modernism, which, according to the pope, constituted "the synthesis of all heresies".

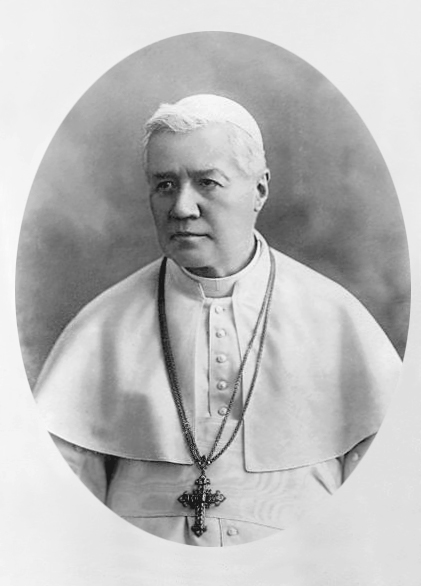
Pope Pius X in 1910.

Regarding the specific situation in Spain, in 1911 Pope Pius X communicated, through his secretary, Cardinal Merry del Val, some norms for Spanish Catholics, the first point of which established that:

It must be maintained as a certain principle that in Spain one can always sustain, as many do most nobly, the Catholic thesis and with it the reestablishment of religious unity.

For decades, Pius X's successors would maintain this policy in Spain. Even Pope John XXIII, in his radio message to the V National Eucharistic Congress in Zaragoza in 1961, said to the Spanish:

We have seen the great virtues of the Spanish people. I hope the Lord keeps you united in your Catholic faith and makes your country ever more prosperous, happier, more faithful to its historical mission.

And Paul VI, in his Message to the VI National Eucharistic Congress in León on 12 July 1964, stated:

Catholic unity will always be a gift of superior order and quality for the social, civil, and spiritual promotion of the country.

Despite this, the promulgation in December 1965 of the declaration Dignitatis humanae, one of the most controversial documents of the Second Vatican Council, would end up introducing the doctrine of freedom of worship within the Church, although its preamble, added by the pope himself, pointed out that it left "intact the traditional Catholic doctrine on the moral duty of men and societies towards the true religion and the one Church of Christ". But in post-conciliar preaching, certain Catholic groups considered that the doctrine of the "social reign of Jesus Christ" had been weakened and obscured, or even denied, to the point that Archbishop Marcel Lefebvre affirmed that Christ had been dethroned.

== History ==
=== Middle Ages ===
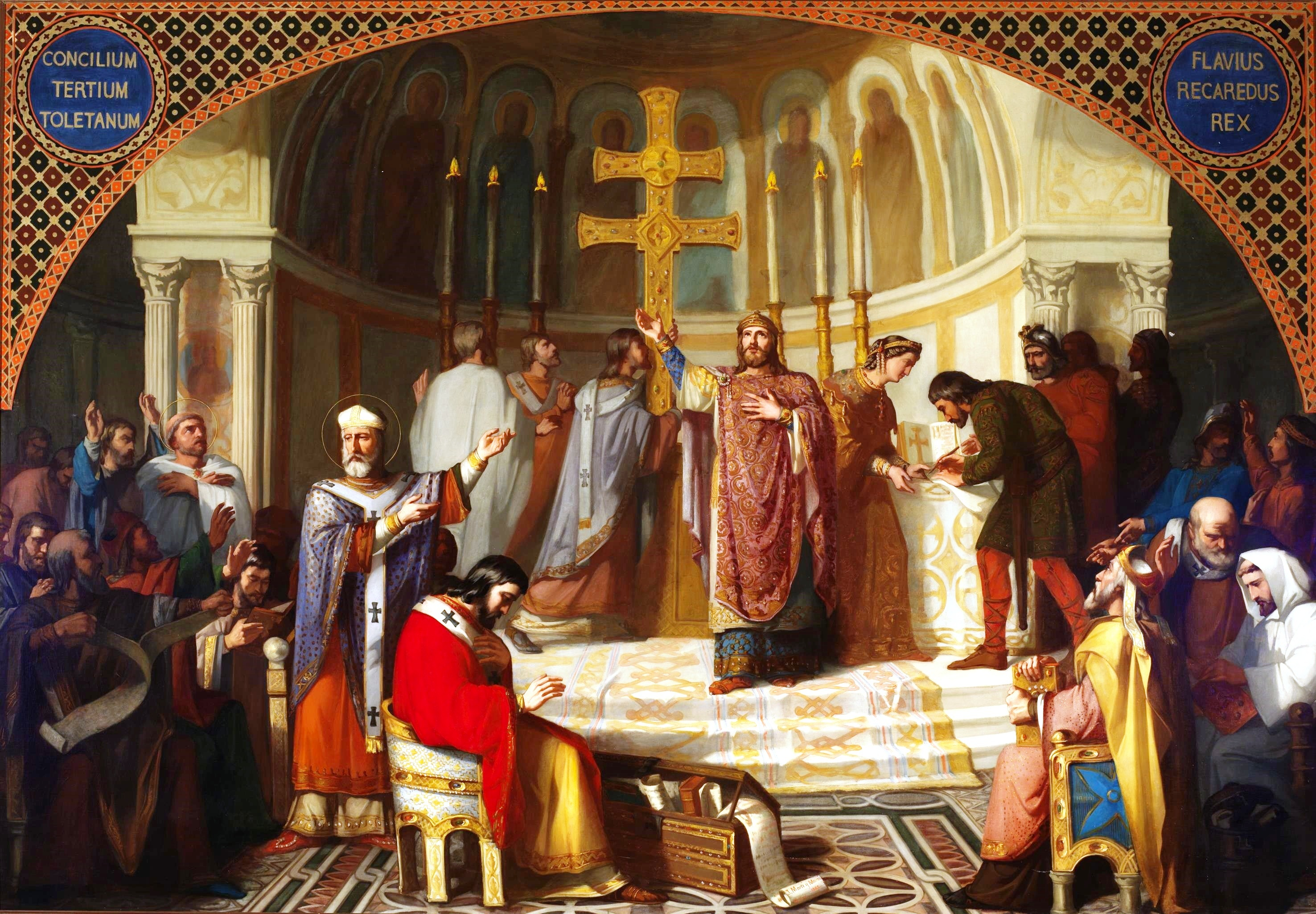
Third Council of Toledo, oil on canvas by José Martí y Monsó (1862).

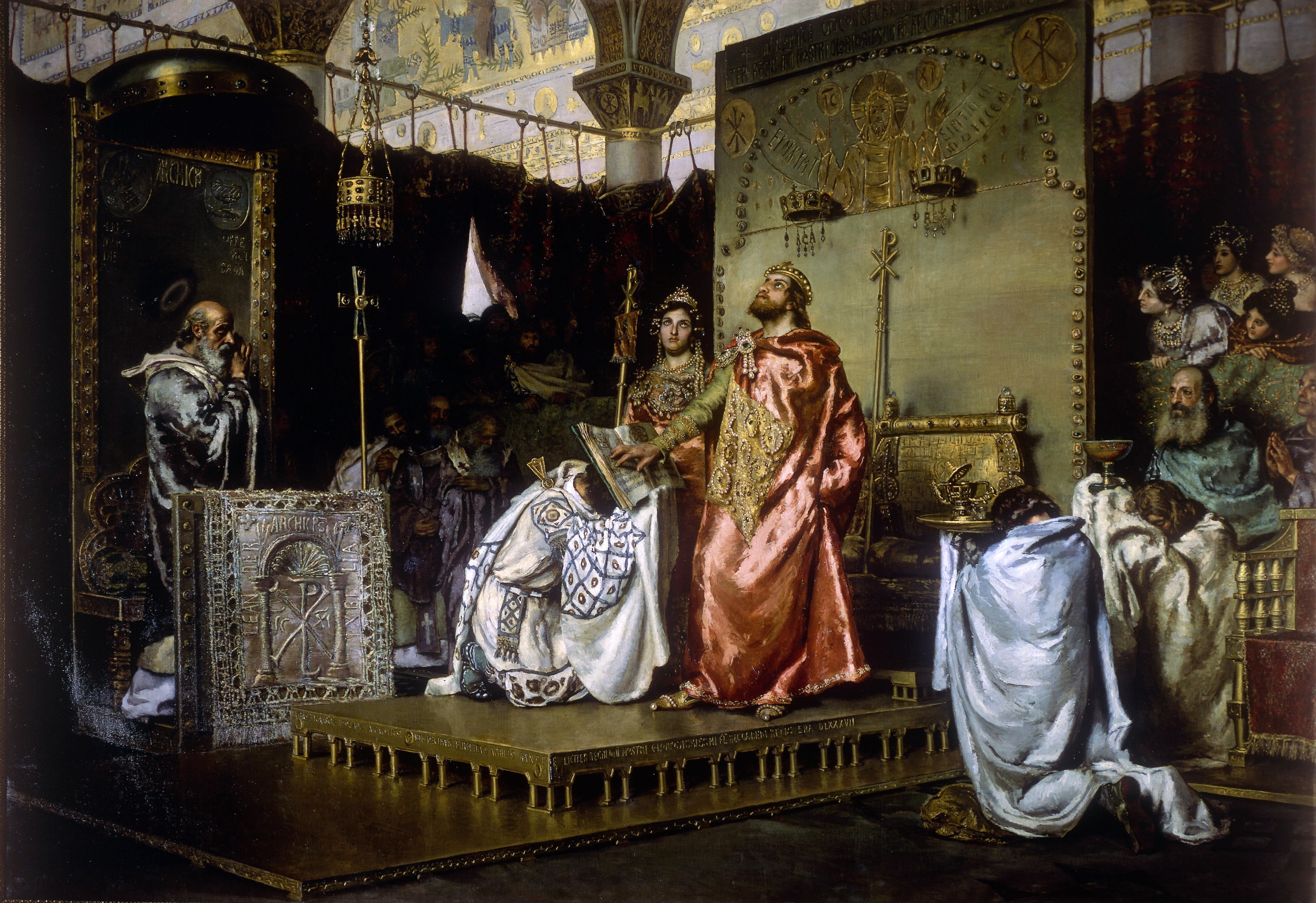
The Conversion of Reccared, painting by Antonio Muñoz Degrain (1888).

Before the Third Council of Toledo, the Iberian Peninsula was socially divided between Visigoths and Hispano-Romans. The latter, who were Catholics, were subject to the former, among whom Arianism initially predominated. Two different legislations applicable to each group also prevailed. From 589 until the Saracen invasion of 711, in Visigothic Hispania only one legislation would exist, and both peoples would merge into one.

According to François Guizot, the Third Council of Toledo marked the beginning of a new phase in Spanish civilization led by the Church. Visigothic law, which he characterized as previously personal and “barbaric” in nature, acquired a more systematic and social character, with members of the clergy exerting influence on the governance of the kingdom. For this reason, some currents of Spanish Catholic thought identified the conversion of Reccared I with the birth of the Spanish nation.

The Suebi, formerly pagan, had already converted to Catholicism with their king Chararic, being incorporated shortly after into the Visigothic kingdom by Reccared's father, Liuvigild. Reccared’s successors, particularly from the reign of Sisebut onward, also promoted the conversion of the Jewish population, seeking religious unity within the kingdom of Hispania under Catholicism.

The Muslim conquest of the Iberian Peninsula in 711 altered this situation. During the period of the Reconquista, Christianity, Islam, and Judaism coexisted both in Muslim-ruled al-Andalus and in the northern Christian kingdoms. Although mixed marriages and apostasy—whether from Islam in al-Andalus or from Catholicism in Christian territories—were prohibited, Christians (Mozarabs) generally retained the right to practice their religion under Islamic rule, Muslims (Mudéjars) under Christian rule, and Jews in both spheres.

Despite the relative tolerance practiced during the early centuries of Muslim rule, relations among religious and social groups in the Emirate and Caliphate of Córdoba were not always peaceful. Episodes of violence occurred, such as the movement of the Martyrs of Córdoba Umar ibn Hafsun. As the Reconquista advanced, the population of the northern Christian kingdoms increased significantly through the migration of Mozarabs from Muslim territories and through captives brought north by Christian expeditions. Severe persecution of Mozarabic Christians in al-Andalus occurred particularly after the invasions of the Almoravids and Almohads. The Almoravids decreed the expulsion of the Mozarabs in 1126, and the Almohads ordered the expulsion of Jews from al-Andalus in 1146.

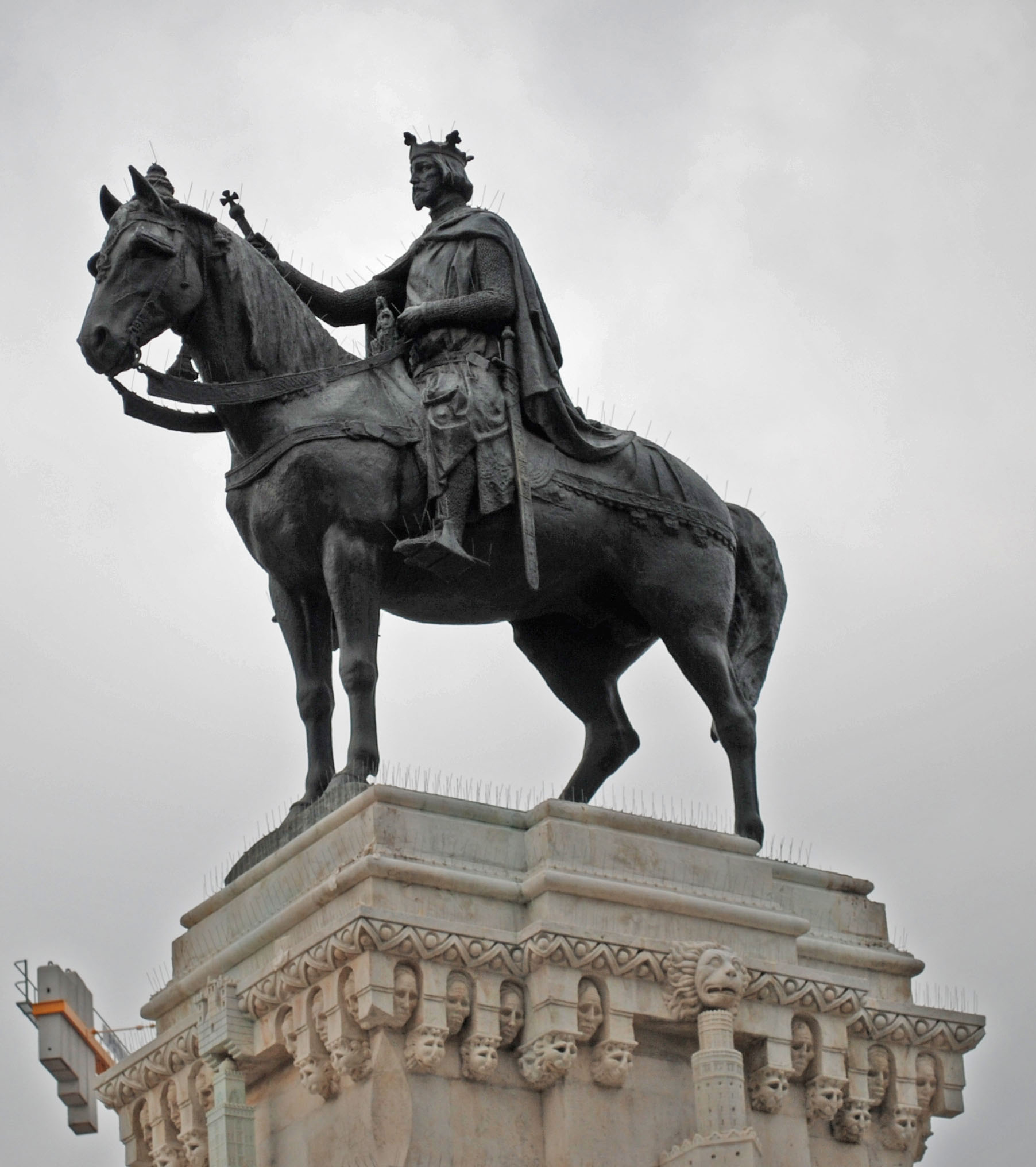
King Ferdinand III of Castile. Equestrian statue in the Plaza Nueva in Seville.

After the expedition of Alfonso the Battler, with which the Mozarabs collaborated, a multitude of them were deported to Africa by decree of the Almoravid emir Ali ibn Yusuf in the year 1126 (thousands of them would manage to return to Spain two decades later, settling in Toledo) and a few years later those who remained, subjected to continuous harassment, were forced, by decree of the Almohad sultan Abd al-Mu'min, to emigrate to Castile and León or Islamize, under penalty of death and confiscation of their property. According to Francisco Javier Simonet, the tyranny of the Almoravids was such that the Muslims of Seville themselves requested the protection of Emperor Alfonso VII of León, obliging themselves to pay him tribute.

After Lower Andalusia was reconquered by King Saint Ferdinand in the following century, the Muslims would finally be expelled from this region as a consequence of the Mudéjar revolt of 1264. Following the departure of the former Muslim population, the region was gradually repopulated with Christians from the north.

From the reign of Alfonso X the Wise, legislation began to incorporate the principle of Catholic unity, which would be reflected in the Fuero Real, the Siete Partidas, and the Ordenamiento de Alcalá.

=== Early Modern period ===
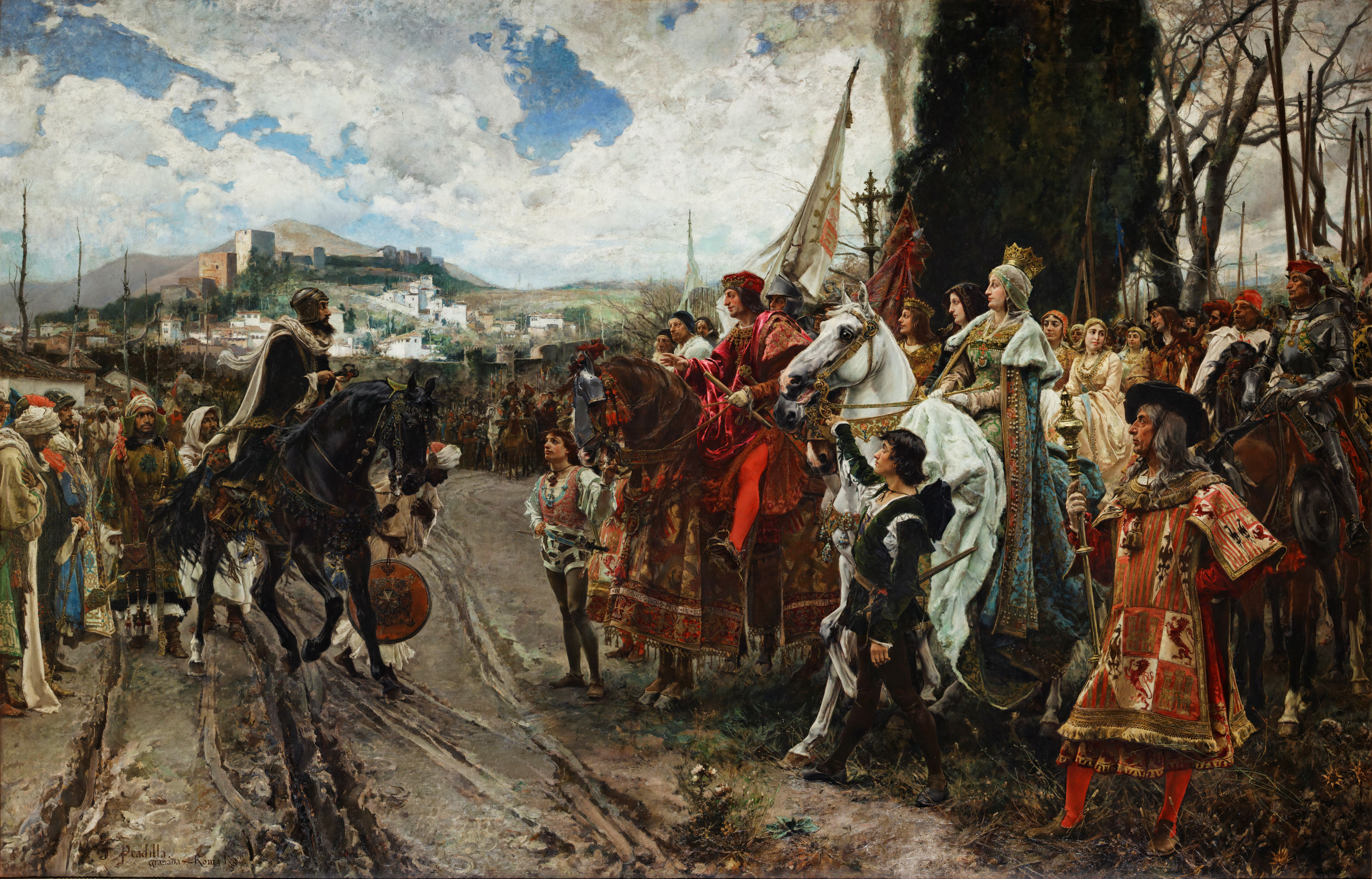
The Surrender of Granada (work by Francisco Pradilla, 1882).

After the culmination of the Reconquista with the taking of Granada, the Catholic Monarchs would set out to definitively recover the peninsular religious unity lost in 711, as coexistence between different religions in Spain generated frequent and bloody tumults. The Jews, in particular, were hated by Christians, who considered them a cursed and foreign people of excessive greed, and accused them of practicing horrendous crimes, such as the ritual crucifixion of Christian children. For their part, the Hebrews organized themselves to confront the Christians, and in 1485 they assassinated the inquisitor Saint Peter of Arbués in La Seo in Zaragoza, which aroused a wave of indignation throughout the kingdom and increased hatred towards Jews and false converts.

All this led to the decree in 1492 of the expulsion of the Jews who did not wish to convert to Christianity. This measure was added to the establishment in 1478 of the Spanish Inquisition, with jurisdiction only over baptized Christians, which had to ensure the integrity and purity of the faith. The main reason for the creation of this tribunal would have been to put an end to the widespread Judaizing practice of the converts. According to Modesto Hernández Villaescusa, one of the main functions of the Holy Office would be to avoid collisions between Old Christians and New Christians, since the former distrusted the latter, who were suspected of being sacrilegious, heretical, and Judaizing. Jaime Balmes would go so far as to say that "Ferdinand and Isabella, in establishing the Inquisition, responded more to the wishes of the people than to their own policy."

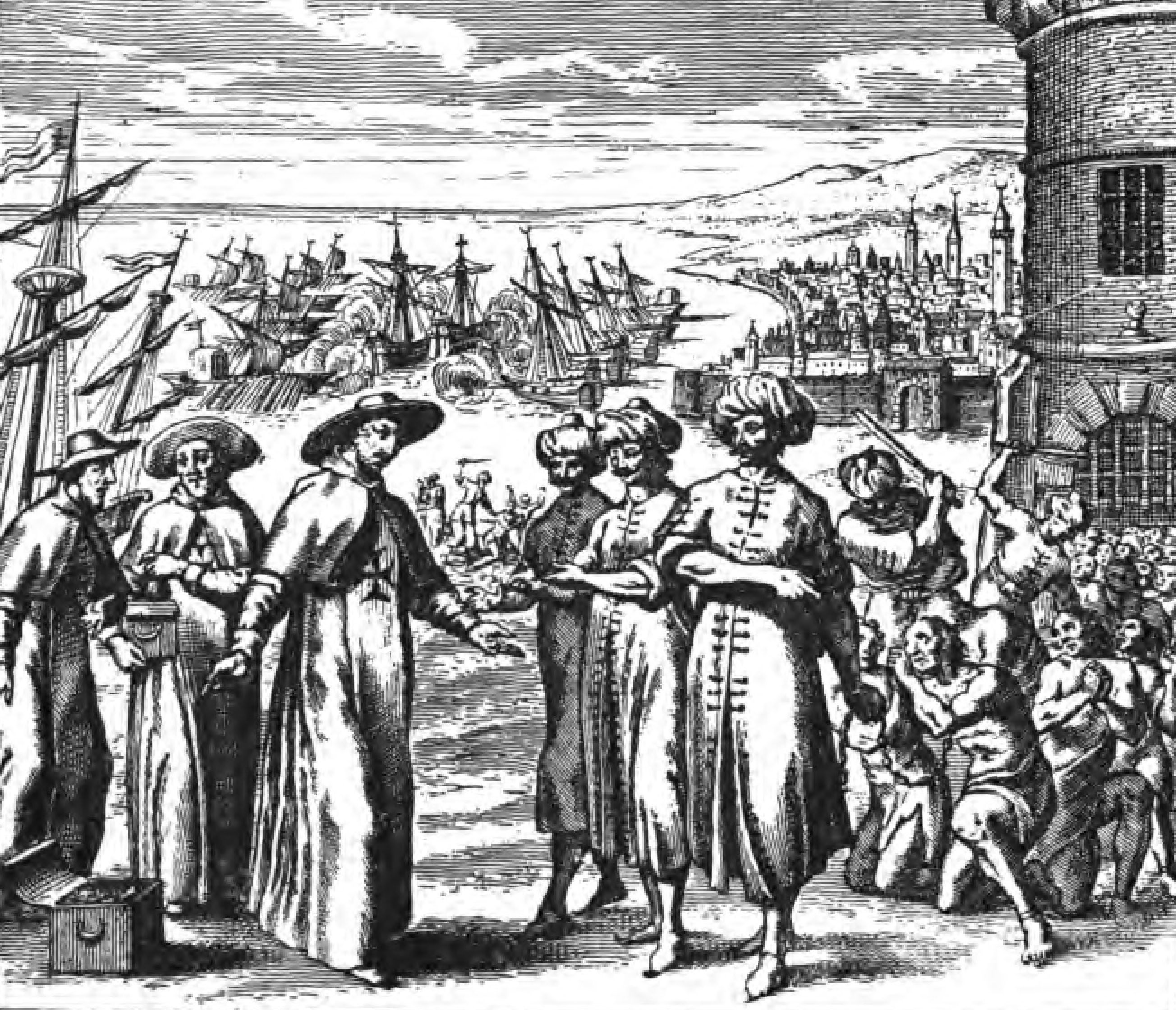
Catholic monks paying a ransom to free captive Christians.

After the first revolt of the Granada Mudéjars (1499-1501), the legal status of mudejaría was suspended, and in 1502 a pragmatic sanction was issued requiring Muslims who wished to remain in the Crown of Castile to convert to Christianity. This measure did not initially extend to the Mudéjars of the Crown of Aragon, largely because of the protection afforded to them by their lords, who derived significant income from their communities. At the popular level, however, hostility toward the Muslim population was pronounced, as demonstrated during the Revolt of the Germanías (1521-1522) in the Kingdom of Valencia. In the Cortes of Zaragoza held in 1519, Charles V swore not to alter the status of the Mudéjars. He subsequently decreed that those wishing to remain in the Crown of Aragon were also required to receive baptism, after obtaining from Pope Clement VII the bull Idcirco Nostris (1524), which released him from his prior oath. The papal decision was justified on the grounds that religious unity was considered necessary to ensure tranquility within his kingdoms.

Throughout the 16th century on the coasts of Spain, especially in the Kingdom of Granada, Turks, Berbers, and corsairs practiced looting and kidnapping of Christians, which, according to reports transmitted to the king, they were able to do due to the treatment and help they received from some natives of the land. Faced with this situation, in the Pragmatic Sanction of 1567 Philip II would prohibit Morisco customs as a final attempt at assimilation, which provoked the Rebellion of the Alpujarras, leading to the expulsion of the Moriscos from the Kingdom of Granada. After the continuous failure of efforts to achieve the full conversion of the Moriscos, the various revolts they led, and their alleged dealings with the Turk, the King of Morocco, the heretics, and other princes hostile to the King of Spain, it would be Philip III who finally decreed in 1609 the expulsion of the Moriscos from all of Spain.

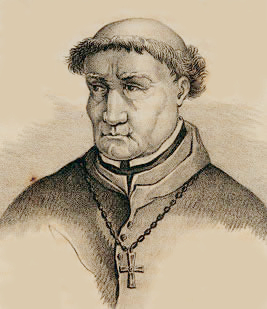
The Inquisitor General Tomás de Torquemada (1420-1498).

During the reign of Philip II, the activity of the Inquisition intensified, and both ecclesiastical and civil authorities adopted a markedly vigilant stance in religious matters. Philip II was regarded as a firm defender of Catholic orthodoxy and opposed the spread of Protestantism within his realms. In his work El Protestantismo comparado con el Catolicismo (1852), Balmes argued that the introduction of Protestantism into Spain during Philip’s reign would likely have provoked civil war, as had occurred in other European countries, and would have endangered the political unity of the Spanish monarchy.

At the same time, some authors have contrasted the actions of the Spanish Inquisition with contemporaneous developments in northern Europe. While numerous trials and executions for witchcraft took place in various parts of Europe, it has been argued that in Spain the Inquisition limited such persecutions and that certain Protestant tribunals were comparatively severe in religious matters. According to Francisco Javier García Rodrigo, the Holy Office in Spain showed leniency toward those who abjured heresy, and many of those tried avoided capital punishment and confiscation of property, as execution required a formal declaration of guilt combined with confession and persistence in error. According to García Rodrigo, thanks to its special regulation, the result produced by the Inquisition would have been positive:

The new Christians were kept together, and at the same time, the spread of Protestantism were stopped. Preserving Catholic unity among the peoples of the Spanish Monarchy helped to create a strong state where science, art and literature flourished. However, the power of the Spanish Empire was growing and it needed to find new worlds for its expansion.

The codes of Castile, Aragon, and Portugal maintained the principle of Catholic unity until the 19th century, as reflected in the Nueva Recopilación (1567) and the Novísima Recopilación (1805), although the rise of Bourbon regalism in the 18th century led to a partial diminution of the Church’s preeminence.

According to Mariano Tirado y Rojas, Freemasonry was introduced into Spain from England in 1727 and initially promoted freedom of worship. Masonic texts imported from Portuguese lodges around 1750 affirmed respect for “all religious practices that morality allows, because it wants the one deemed appropriate in conscience to be respected” and denied the divinity of Jesus Christ. Although King Ferdinand VI, in line with papal condemnations, prohibited Freemasonry in 1751, enforcement was limited, and Masons soon attained prominent political positions. The first Spanish Freemason to hold significant governmental power was the Count of Aranda, minister of Charles III, who in 1767 ordered the expulsion of the Jesuits, an action celebrated by Masonic circles.

The 18th century also saw the influence of Jansenist in Spain, a movement hostile to the Jesuits and condemned as heretical by the Holy See, which advocated an enlightened form of regalism that transferred prerogatives from the pope to the king. In the words of the Italian Jansenist cleric Domingo Cavalario, the pope, religious orders, decretals, and the Inquisition were the source of the Church’s ills, and comprehensive reform was necessary.

However, the historian Vicente de la Fuente affirmed that Charles III did not dare to abolish the Inquisition, reportedly telling his minister Manuel de Roda, “The Spaniards want it, and it does not bother me,” when the subject was raised. His ministers, however, gradually curtailed the tribunal’s powers, leaving it significantly weakened by the end of his reign. Under Charles IV, the Jansenist Ramón José de Arce was appointed Inquisitor General, reflecting continued attempts at administrative reform.

=== Reign of Ferdinand VII ===
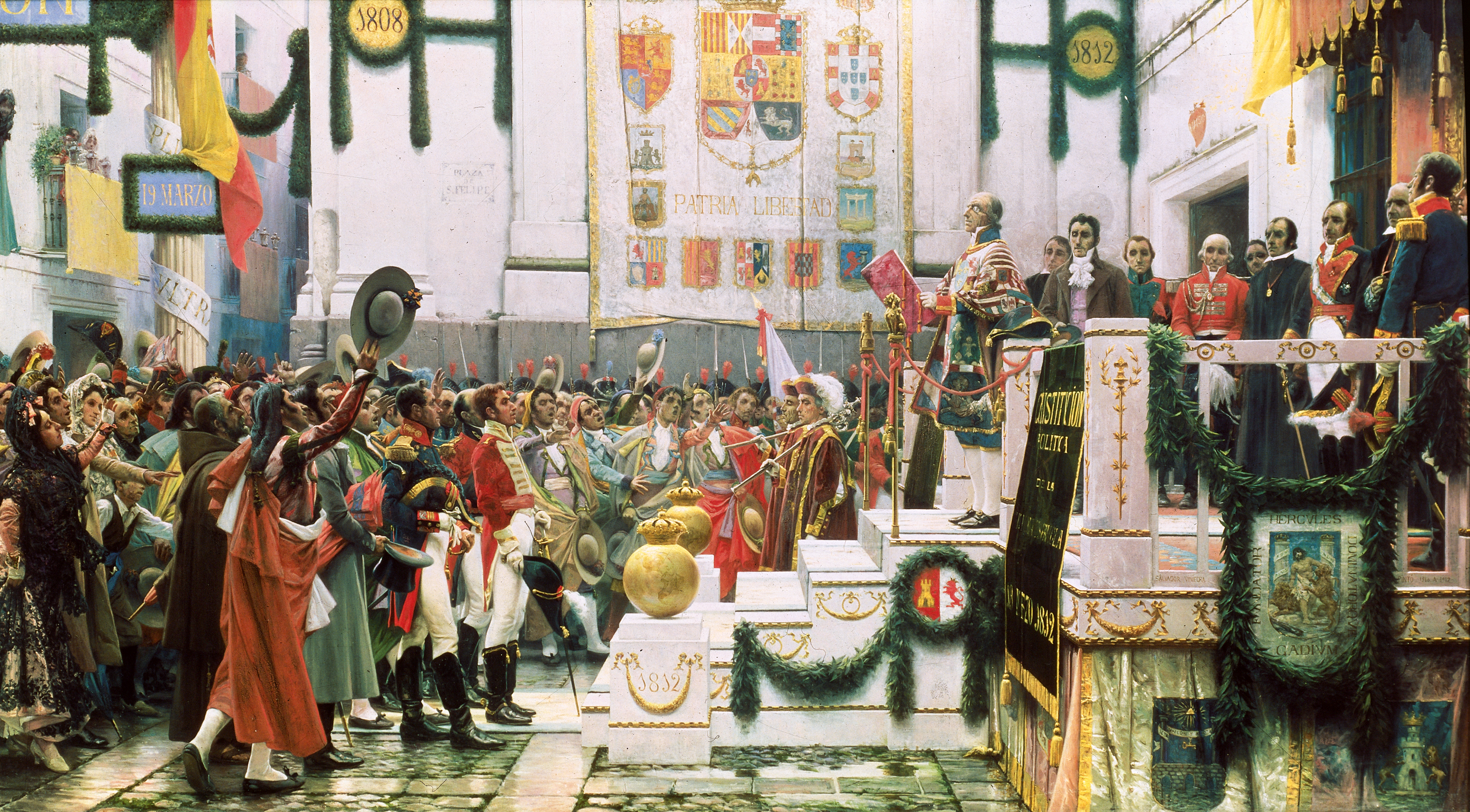
The Promulgation of the Constitution of 1812, work by Salvador Viniegra.

The irruption of liberalism in Spain after the French invasion of 1808 undermined the authority of the Church in society. However, neither the Statute of Bayonne, nor the Constitution of Cádiz, nor subsequent ones up to that of 1845 ceased to contain in their articles precepts affirming religious unity as a constitutional essence. In fact, the Constitution of 1812 would even state in its Article 12:

The religion of the Spanish Nation is and shall be perpetually the Catholic, Apostolic, Roman, the only true one. The Nation protects it by wise and just laws and prohibits the exercise of any other.

Despite this, on 28 February 1813, the Cortes of Cádiz decreed the abolition of the Inquisition, which would be restored in 1814 by Ferdinand VII after his return to Spain. The early liberals would also accuse the Ferdinandean absolutists of being liars for stating that the Constitution of 1812, promoted by "libertines, heretics, impious, and Freemasons", according to them, came to strip Spaniards of their religion. On the contrary, in his pamphlet La Constitución vindicada de las groseras calumnias de sus enemigos (The Constitution vindicated from the gross slanders of its enemies) 1820, the liberal canon Santiago Sedeño affirmed:

This kind Constitution recognises the Catholic Apostolic Roman Religion as its mother, and establishes that it shall always be the religion of the Spaniards. It also promises to protect the religion and to avenge any insults directed towards it. The Constitution imposes an obligation on the ruler to enforce the laws in favour of this "beloved mother" and to protect her.

Nevertheless, during the Liberal Triennium secularizing measures would occur, such as the suppression of all monasteries of the monastic orders for their disentailment, and the definitive abolition of the Inquisition. In 1822 the Royalist War broke out, establishing the so-called Regency of Urgel in Catalonia. Within the framework of the Holy Alliance, a French army, known as the Hundred Thousand Sons of Saint Louis, entered Spain to aid the royalists, and were received as liberators with cries of "Long live the absolute king!" and "Long live Religion and the Inquisition!".

Once Ferdinand VII was liberated in 1823, the king decided not to re-establish the tribunal of the Holy Office and made a series of concessions to the liberals, which ultimately motivated a new insurrection, also mainly centered in Catalonia, known as the War of the Aggrieved (Guerra dels Malcontents), this time against the king's government. After the death of Ferdinand VII in 1833, the First Carlist War would break out, in which, under a dynastic dispute, the partisans of the Ancien Régime and those of the new liberal parliamentary system would fight for seven years.

=== Reign of Isabella II ===
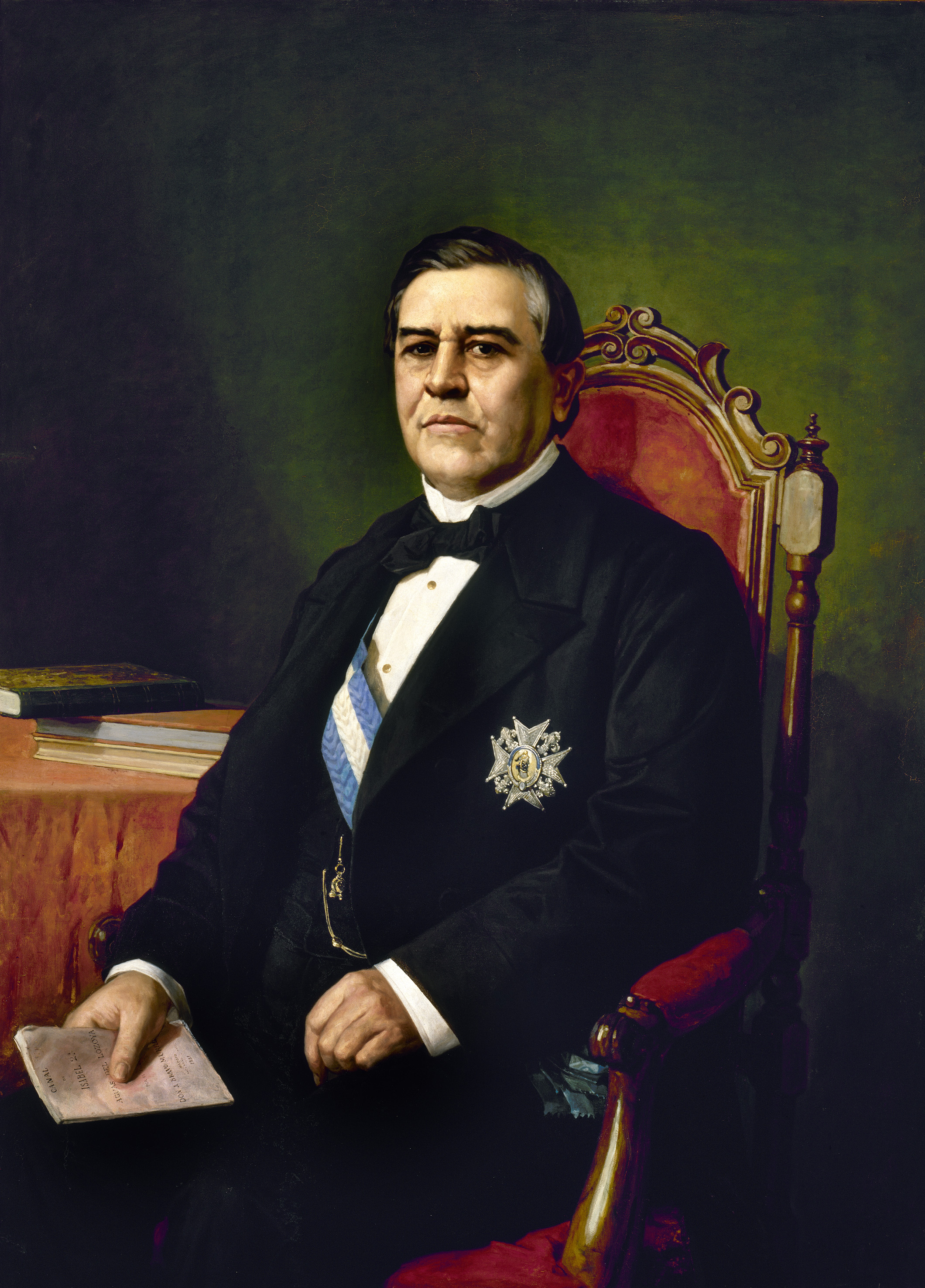
Juan Bravo Murillo, president of the government when the Concordat of 1851 was signed.

During the reign of Isabella II, in which liberalism in Spain would be definitively established, Catholic unity was preserved, although a religious tribunal no longer existed. In the concordat between Spain and the Holy See of 1851, which re-established Church-State relations after the disentailments that had deprived the Church of its property, it was stated in its Article 1:

The Catholic religion is the only one that the Spanish nation recognises, and it shall always be protected in the lands of His Catholic Majesty, with all the rights and privileges it should have according to the law of God and the rules of the Church.

However, the Democratic Party, the left wing of liberalism, would advocate for freedom of worship. During the progressive biennium, amidst rumors that the draft Spanish Constitution of 1856 might contemplate freedom of worship, the queen herself, who retained the power of veto, would state to the progressive deputy Vicente Sancho:

I must tell you that I will never agree to the destruction of the great work of our Catholic unity, and I will not allow, no matter what, the holy religion of our ancestors to suffer during my reign.

The Carlists, for their part, would not cease to oppose the close possibility of freedom of worship being granted in Spain, and in their "letter to the Spaniards", Maria Teresa of Braganza, widow of Carlos María Isidro de Borbón, in invalidating her stepson Juan de Borbón y Braganza as the "legitimate king" (due to his liberal thought and his recognition of Isabella II's constitutional monarchy), defined Catholic unity as "the most fundamental of our laws, the solid foundation of the Spanish Monarchy, as of all true civilization," adding that "the certain and infallible truths of the Catholic faith" were "the solid foundation of our political, civil, and domestic life" and that "the Decalogue, the Divine Code, is the foundation of all our laws." In the drafting of this and other manifestos of the Princess of Beira, the Bishop of Seo de Urgel, José Caixal, and the director of the newspaper La Esperanza, Pedro de la Hoz, collaborated.

=== Democratic Sexennium ===
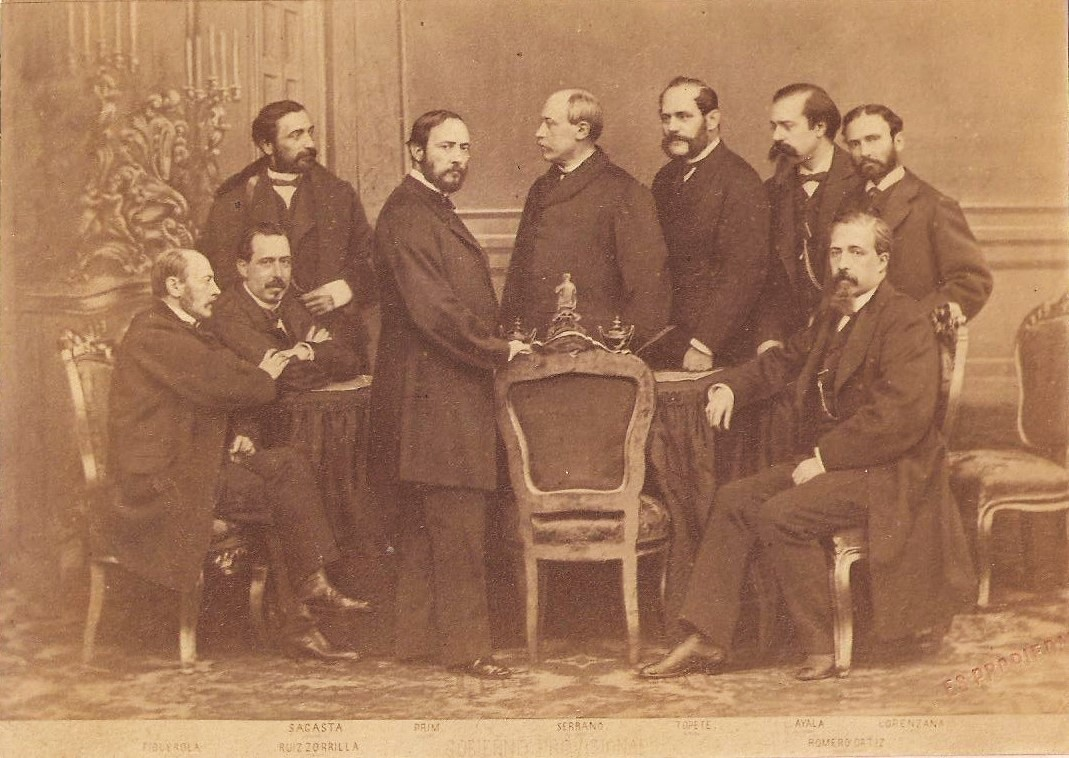
Provisional government of 1869. Many of the ministers were Freemasons.

According to Mariano Tirado y Rojas, revolutionary elements such as Generals Serrano and Prim, Práxedes Mateo Sagasta, Manuel Becerra, Nicolás María Rivero, Juan Moreno Benítez, Juan Álvarez de Lorenzana and almost all the ministers, undersecretaries, directors general, civil governors, and captains general belonged to regular Freemasonry and obeyed the same Supreme Council, which in mid-October 1868 addressed a program with 14 anti-clerical propositions to the Provisional Government, the first of which was freedom of worship.

Article 21 of the Constitution of 1869 would state:

Spain is a country that respects and protects the Catholic religion. People of other religions are also free to worship however they want. However, this freedom is limited by the universal rules of morality and law.
If some people in Spain follow a religion other than Catholicism, they also have the right to practice their religion freely.

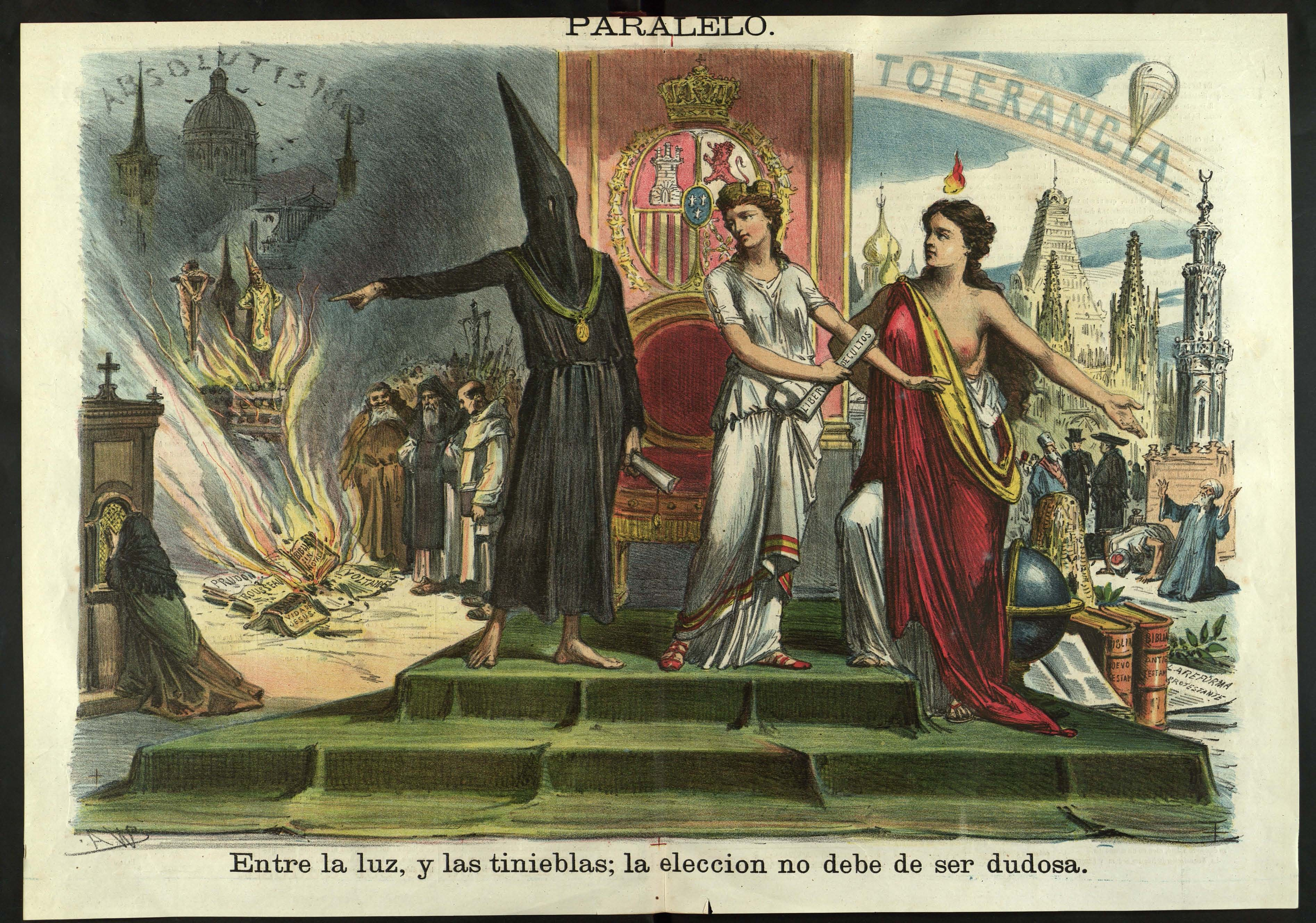
"Parallel", drawing appearing in 1875 in the liberal and anti-Carlist magazine La Madeja, presenting the dilemma between an absolutist and inquisitorial Spain and a Spain with mosques where Catholics, Protestants, and Muslims live together harmoniously.

Due to their defense of Catholic unity, suppressed by the legislation of the Revolutionary Sexennium, a good part of the liberal moderates joined Carlism, which at that time went from being a phenomenon of an insurrectional character that fundamentally demanded the restoration of the Ancien Régime in the proscribed dynasty, to becoming a renewed political movement with numerous newspapers throughout Spain, a minority of up to 51 deputies in the Cortes, and a defined political doctrine that would make Catholic unity its banner as the main demand.

The pretender Carlos VII defined Catholic unity as "the symbol of our glories, the spirit of our laws, and the blessed bond of union of all Spaniards, who love it and demand it as an integral part of their dearest aspirations." One of the most eloquent defenders of religious unity in the Cortes during this period was the canon Vicente Manterola. Three million signatures from Spaniards were presented asking for the maintenance of Catholic unity, although this did not succeed in changing the law.

Since the Basque-Navarrese fueros, which were still in force, sanctioned Catholic unity in those provinces (as they only allowed Old Christians to live in Biscay), during this era Carlism also began to make fuerismo a banner as an essential part of its political doctrine, making it clear that freedom of worship, civil marriage, and other laws of the revolutionary government constituted a violation of the fuero (contrafuero), as denounced by the Biscayan traditionalist Arístides de Artiñano.

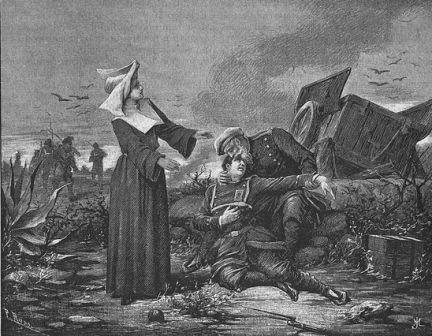
A Martyr for Catholic Unity (engraving by Paciano Ross depicting a scene from the Third Carlist War).

=== Restoration ===
Once the liberal monarchy was restored in the person of Alfonso XII, a middle ground on the religious question was sought between the maximalist positions of the Carlists and Republicans. The Constitution of 1876 represented a compromise, and although Article 11 did not strictly maintain religious unity (invoking the hypothesis of dissident cults and settling on the thesis of the lesser evil), it repealed the freedom of worship of the Constitution of 1869, instead establishing a regime of tolerance of cults. The aforementioned Article 11 read as follows:

The Catholic, Apostolic and Roman religion is the official religion of the country. The nation promises to look after its worship and its religious leaders. People in Spain will not be treated badly for their religious opinions or for how they worship, as long as they respect Christian beliefs. However, only the religion of the State can be practised in public.

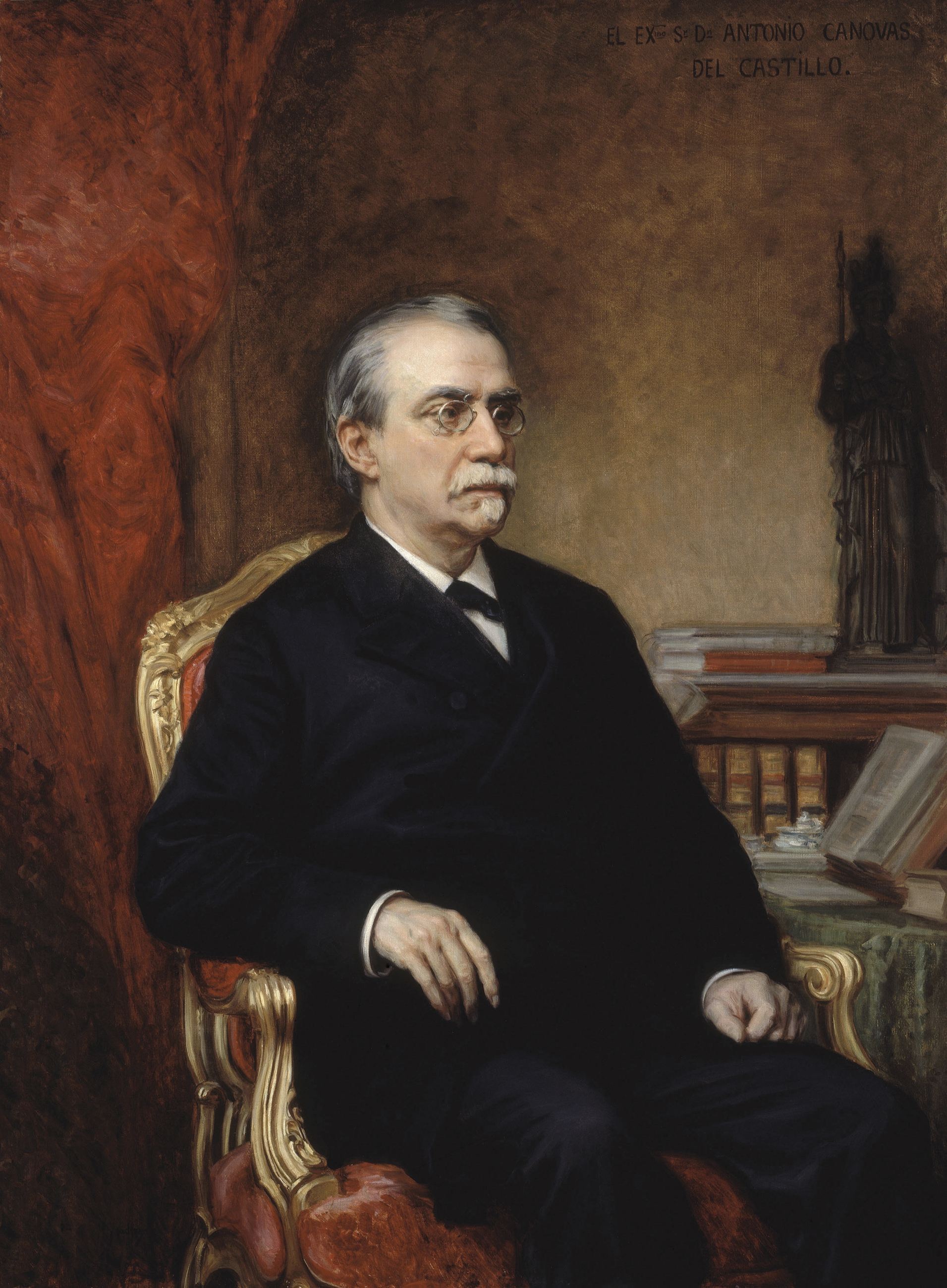
Antonio Cánovas del Castillo, architect of the Constitution of 1876.

The Apostolic Nuncio communicated to the government, in the name of Pope Pius IX, his concern and complaint regarding the aforementioned article, due to the "dire consequences it would bring to the Spanish nation, which since time immemorial has been in possession of the precious jewel of Catholic unity." For his part, the Cardinal Archbishop of Toledo, Primate of the Spains, together with other bishops, wrote to King Alfonso XII begging him to preserve Catholic unity in Spain, since what was intended with the law of religious tolerance was "to propagate the horrible leprosy of indifferentism, heresy, and impiety" and "to de-Catholicize the Spanish people." Other prelates also stated that the Spanish people would end up despising the laws of God and the Church, without respecting social principles, not even that of authority, because tolerance of cults would engender indifferentism, indifferentism irreligion, and irreligion anarchy.

The Bishop of Salamanca, Narciso Martínez Izquierdo, would state in the Senate, alluding to Article 11:

This article is about giving Spaniards a right; it is given not only to non-Christians, but also to people who have renounced their faith. On the other hand, every faithful Christian, even the most devoted Catholics, will have to accept this right and live with it their whole life... This right is granted to citizenship, and it is combined, strengthened and expanded by all other rights, by the exercise of the press, the platform, and even by the prestige of authority. This means that it becomes not only the right to practice false cults, but a means of seduction and even imposition of those cults.

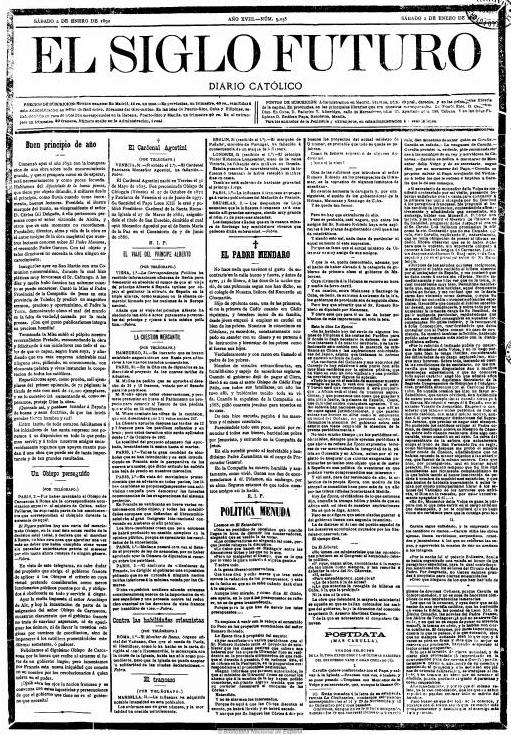
Newspaper El Siglo Futuro (1875-1936), organ of the Integrist Party and the Traditionalist Communion.

On the other side, the work of Cánovas del Castillo was bitterly censured, considering that there had been no need to repeal the constitutional text of 1869 in a matter so substantial for progressive liberalism as freedom of worship, and labeling his actions in this regard as retrograde. Cánovas said that the regime of legal tolerance articulated in the Constitution was preferable to the regime of practical or de facto tolerance that resulted from the application of the previous Constitutions of 1837 and 1845.

According to Joaquín Sánchez de Toca, public law should take as its basis, not only that the Catholic religion was that of official Spain, the religion of the State, but also that of all Spaniards; that being a child of Spain was enough to be a child of the Church. Article 11 of the Constitution confined this profession of faith to official Spain, to the legal organism of national sovereignty, to the State. The Spanish nation continued to be Catholic, but religious unity was no longer the basis of Spanish citizenship; the dissident, and even the apostate, had entered into the common law of Spanish citizenship. This was the most transcendental alteration introduced by the Constitution of 1876, if not in the letter, in the spirit of the Concordat of 1851, which in theory would continue in force until the proclamation of the Second Republic in 1931.

During the Restoration, the Integrist Party led by Ramón Nocedal (separated from Carlism in 1888), would not only demand the abolition of tolerance of cults, but would also demand Catholic unity with "coercive sanction," that is, the recovery of a repressive body for crimes against the faith like the Inquisition. In their program they would state:

We want unity among Catholics and that no crime be more abhorrent or have a greater penalty than heresy, apostasy, attacks on religion, rebellion against God and His Church.

We uphold the faith of our ancestors, their firmest intolerance of error, and their unbreakable adherence to the See of Peter. We want the absolute return of Catholic principles and the complete restoration of the Christian and glorious traditions of our homeland, from the time it was constituted upon the unity of the Catholic faith in the Councils of Toledo and reconstituted fighting against the enemies of God in the Reconquest.

God is the most important aspect, and Catholic unity is the most fundamental law of Spanish society. But Catholic unity is about more than just saying that the true religion is the religion of the state and of the Spaniards. It's not just about having fancy displays, pomp, and external ceremonies. It's not just about giving freedom to the Church and stopping false cults and anti-Catholic ideas. Instead, it's about Jesus Christ ruling in laws and customs, in public and private institutions, in all teaching, in all spoken or written propaganda, in the king as in the subjects. It's about the government of Christ the King, Lord and absolute Master of all things.

Catholic unity is the most basic law of Spanish society. If you go against this law or are not guided by it, then there is no law that says you have to do something, no right that is valid, no legitimate authority, no allowed teaching, no free teaching, and no permitted work. This is because in our secular constitution, Catholic unity is the basic idea of all authority and all rights, and the most important code of all action and all doctrine.

— (Manifesto of Burgos published in 1888 by Ramón Nocedal and other directors of the Integrist press).

This unity was given to Spain by Christianity. The Church created us and nurtured us, with her martyrs and confessors, her Fathers, and the admirable regime of her Councils. Because of this, we became a strong nation, instead of a group of people from different backgrounds who would always be at risk of being taken advantage of... Spain shared its faith with much of the world; Spain punished heretics, supported the Tridentine Mass, protected Rome and was the home of Saint Ignatius... This is our strength and our unity, and we have no other. If the day is lost, Spain will return to the cantonalism of the Arevaci, the Vettones or the taifa kings.

— (Menéndez Pelayo: Historia de los heterodoxos españoles. Epilogue).

In 1889, the partisans of Carlism and Integrism would celebrate extensively the "13th Centenary of the Catholic Unity of Spain" originating in the Third Council of Toledo. The former created local, provincial, regional, and central committees, and organized civil and religious festivities that constituted a demonstration and a display of the forces of the Carlist party. The commemoration also served the traditionalists as a counter-celebration of the first centenary of the French Revolution. Don Carlos, characterized by the Marquis of Cerralbo as the "new Reccared," had stated the previous year: "I want to establish that lost Unity, and I want to conquer this Revolution, overwhelming peoples and kings." It was planned to erect a pyramid in Toledo commemorating the conversion of Reccared, but the project was ultimately not carried out due to financial difficulties and the opposition of the liberal government. For their part, the Integrists began a subscription to place a commemorative plaque in the Church of Santa Leocadia, where the subsequent Councils of Toledo had taken place. This initiative, which came from Félix Sardá y Salvany through the Diario de Cataluña, was successfully completed in May 1892, in an event attended by the deputies of the Integrist minority in the Cortes, Ramón Nocedal and Liborio de Ramery.

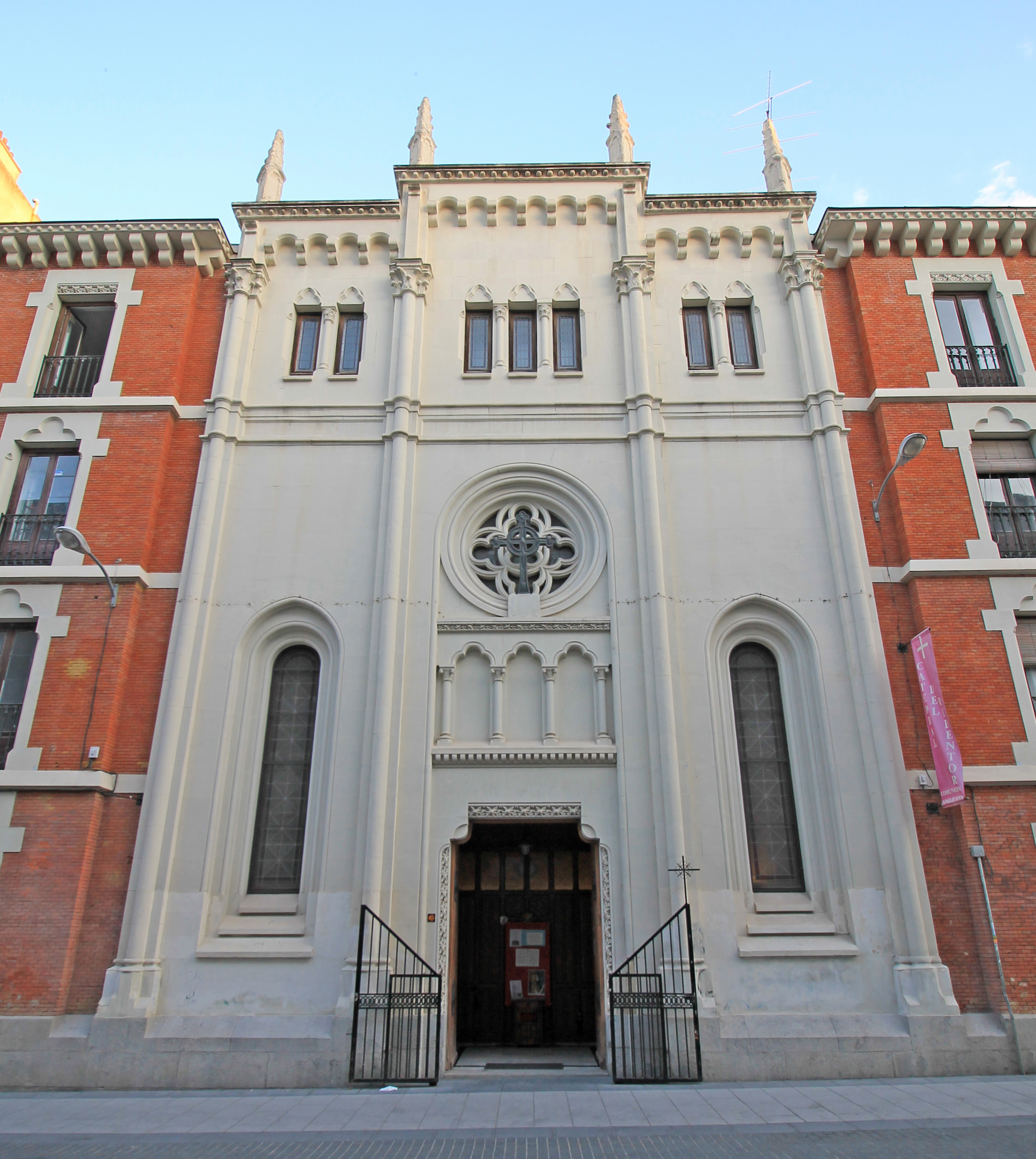
Protestant church in Madrid inaugurated in 1893, during the government of Sagasta. The regent Maria Christina even assured that she would intervene to close it.

The Liberal Party and other left-wing forces would seek exactly the opposite of the Carlists and Integrists. Thus, in a speech given in Zaragoza in 1908, Segismundo Moret presented freedom of worship as the fundamental basis upon which the union of all left-wing parties should be constituted, and the various governments presided over by Sagasta from the beginning of the 20th century repeatedly declared their intention to reform the Concordat of 1851 to reduce the state contribution for worship and clergy to the Church.

It is, consequently, Catholicism, an intrinsic and essential element in the real and legal constitution of Spanish society; it is the deepest foundation of our nationality and the axis upon which our legislation and all our social life revolve.

— (Torras y Bages: Pastoral Letter "Dios y el César", published in 1913 and which earned an autograph letter of congratulations from Pius X).

By Royal Order of 10 June 1910, the work of José Canalejas, considered by many Catholics as the worst enemy of the Church in Spain, the application of tolerance of cults was further expanded, to the point that a breakdown in relations between the Spanish State and the Holy See came to be spoken of.

Without moral unity anywhere and with discord everywhere, nation and homeland are extinguished. Only the name will remain, applied to a variable piece of the map. Unity of beliefs and immutable authority that guards it, only that constitutes nations and ignites patriotisms.

— (Vázquez de Mella).

With the draft law on Associations and the "Padlock Law" against religious orders, the expansion of civil marriage, and the secularization of cemeteries, the liberal government also aimed to reduce the influence of the Church in Spanish society. These laws were not vetoed by Alfonso XIII, despite the requests made to him by the bishops.

After the assassination of Canalejas, tensions between the government and the Church ended; the situation began to normalize with the government of the Count of Romanones and the religious question would lose intensity in subsequent years, although it would not completely disappear.

=== Second Republic ===
The Second Republic approached the issue of freedom of worship in a liberal-progressive manner, and broke any type of relationship between the State and the Church. From the recognition of the Catholic religion as the official one of the State, it moved to a radical separation between both realities. Likewise, the Republic abolished state funding of the Church from the beginning, introduced divorce, decreed secular education, and dissolved the Society of Jesus in Spain. According to María Teresa de Lemus, the Republican Constitution of 1931 was, above all, anti-Catholic.

=== Francoism ===
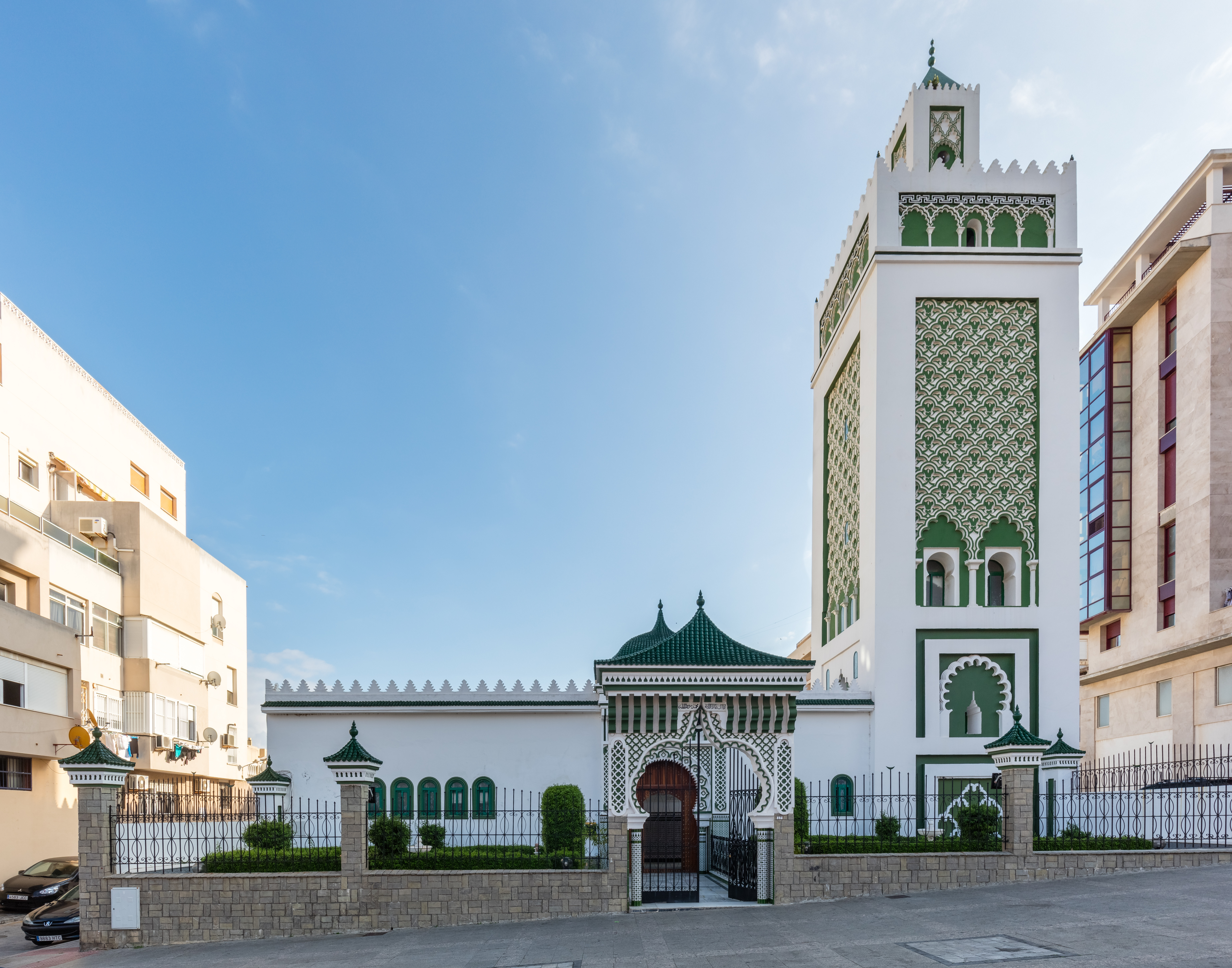
Muley El Mehdi Mosque in Ceuta, inaugurated on 18 July 1940.

After the Spanish Civil War of 1936–1939 and the establishment of the Franco regime under Francisco Franco, the practice of religions other than Catholicism was tolerated to a limited extent, particularly among foreign residents, as had occurred during the Restoration period. This situation was formalized in the Fuero de los Españoles, which, in terms similar to those of the Spanish Constitution of 1876, stated that "No one shall be molested for their religious beliefs or the private exercise of their worship," although the same article added immediately that "No other ceremonies or external manifestations other than those of the Catholic Religion shall be permitted."

On 12 December 1946, the newly created United Nations condemned the Spanish regime for not respecting "freedom of speech, of opinion, and of religion," a condemnation joined in 1947 by the decision of US President Harry S. Truman to exclude Spain from the Marshall Plan. In 1947, Harry S. Truman excluded Spain from the Marshall Plan, and in 1952 he opposed Spain’s admission to NATO, citing delays by the Spanish government in allowing individuals to practice their religion freely.

During the post-war period, traditionalist sectors denounced these external pressures and the expansion of Protestantism in Spain. In 1948, the National Secretariat of the Traditionalist Student Group, an organization aligned with Javier de Borbón Parma and Manuel Fal Conde, published a manifesto in defense of Catholic unity, describing Protestantism as a political danger for Spain and accusing the victorious powers of the Second World War of mobilizing European religious sectarianism against the country. It further warned of Protestant infiltration and expansion within Spain. The Carlist Melchor Ferrer also denounced in early 1950 the establishment of a Protestant seminary near Madrid, the circulation of Protestant publications, and the degree of official tolerance that permitted, among other measures, the appointment of a Protestant professor in Zaragoza.

The practice of other non-Christian religions would also be tolerated. In 1938, Ramón Serrano Suñer, then Minister of the Interior in the rebel government, initiated the construction of a mosque in Ceuta and delivered a speech praising the Muslim population. In 1947, the Francoist authorities inaugurated the Central Mosque of Melilla. From the late 1940s onward, Jewish religious practice was also permitted, and during the 1950s references appeared in official reports to the synagogue in Madrid and to the Jewish community in Spain.

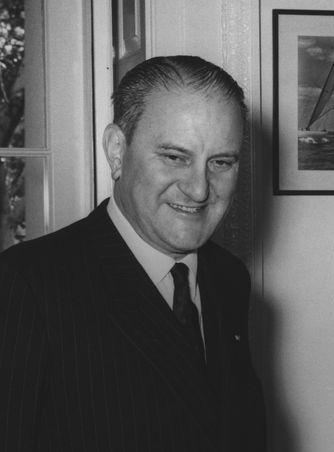
Fernando María Castiella, architect of the 1967 religious freedom law.

Nevertheless, the 1941 Agreement and the Concordat of 1953 between the Spanish State and the Holy See partly reaffirmed what was stated in the Concordat of 1851, which referred to the Catholic, Apostolic, Roman Religion as "the sole religion of the Spanish nation." However, the expression “to the exclusion of any other worship” was omitted, leading Melchor Ferrer to argue that genuine religious unity did not exist under Francoism.

During the 1940s and 1950s, some of the Protestant chapels that were being established were assaulted and looted, apparently by Carlist militants, far-rightists, or dependents of the diocesan Church. The pastoral letters of Cardinal Segura and the writings of Bishop Zacarías de Vizcarra in turn made reference to the "immense Protestant propaganda" taking place in Spain.

In 1962, the Francoist government announced the preparation of a statute intended to grant broader freedoms to Protestant communities. The draft, promoted by Foreign Minister Fernando María Castiella, prompted opposition from sectors of the ultra-Catholic press.

Faced with this situation, in 1963 the leaders of the Traditionalist Communion issued a manifesto in defense of Catholic unity in the name of Javier de Borbón Parma. In 1965, the professor Rafael Gambra, author of the book La unidad religiosa y el derrotismo católico (Religious Unity and Catholic Defeatism), published by Editorial Católica Española S. A. and awarded that same year, argued in a press article that the introduction of religious freedom would facilitate Protestant and Jewish influence in Spain.

The Catholic unity of Spain is a fact of history, society and politics. It is not just about the number of people in Spain. Although most people in Spain are Catholic, this is not the main reason why the Catholic community in Spain is united.The Catholic unity of Spain is a fact of history, society and politics. It is not just about the number of people in Spain. Although most people in Spain are Catholic, this is not the main reason why the Catholic community in Spain is united. Another important factor in Spanish Catholic unity, which has a big influence on the spirit and history of Spain as a nation and as a people, is the Catholic, Apostolic and Roman faith that is present in the country's national consciousness, mentality, institutions, arts, traditions, customs, folklore and lifestyle. So it is. Whether you like it or not, this is the face and soul of Spain.

— (Pedro Cantero Cuadrado, 1963).

Among the publications that showed their frontal opposition to the religious freedom project were, among others, the magazines Juan Pérez, ¿Qué pasa? and El Cruzado Español. The latter reproduced in 1963 a paragraph by Zacarías de Vizcarra, in which he said:

In Spain, the loss of religious unity is, in the short term, the loss of national unity, with the sowing of contradictory ideals, the reappearance of regional separatisms, civil wars, and a return to Celtiberian individualism, which would end with direct and indirect foreign domination.

The Second Vatican Council and its declaration on religious freedom Dignitatis humanae would strengthen Castiella's position. On 22 November 1966, General Franco announced to the Cortes the modification of Article 6 of the Fuero of the Spaniards, which would be worded as follows:

The State shall assume the protection of religious freedom, which will be guaranteed by effective legal protection that, at the same time, safeguards morality and public order.

Shortly after the reform of the Fuero de los Españoles, which was favorably received by the Movement press, the Council of Ministers approved on 24 February 1967 the draft law prepared by Fernando María Castiella. Castiella argued that religious freedom constituted a natural right and was necessary if Spain wished to attain full respect within the international community. The bill, which was intensely debated in the Francoist Cortes, received 239 amendments. The Archbishop of Valencia, Marcelino Olaechea, one of the procuradores, left the chamber at the outset of the debates.

Approximately twenty procuradores expressed total opposition to the project, including Blas Piñar and the traditionalists Joaquín Manglano and José Luis Zamanillo. The Baron de Cárcer, Ramón Albistur Esparza, and Fermín Yzurdiaga submitted amendments rejecting the bill in its entirety. Blas Piñar did not oppose the text as a whole but maintained that the development of religious freedom did not require statutory rank and could be implemented by the government through other regulatory provisions. On 20 May, a tribute was held at the Madrid restaurant El Bosque in honor of fifteen procuradores who had most strongly opposed the project, (Note: According to the memoirs of Blas Piñar, those honored were Ramón Albístur, Agustín de Asís Garrote, Agustín de Bárcena, the Baron de Cárcer, José María Codón, Luis Coronel de Palma, Miguel Fagoaga, Lucas María de Oriol, Blas Piñar, Fermín Sanz Orrio, José Luis Zamanillo, Luís Gómez de Aranda, Fermín Izurdiaga, Jesús López Medel and Luis Valero Bermejo, of whom the last four excused their attendance for various reasons. The public turnout for the tribute was very large. From outside, some individuals tried to disrupt the event by throwing stones at the windows of the hall, some of which entered, although they did not cause injuries. Archbishop Olaechea, who had adhered to the tribute, stated to the procuradores that they had been faithful to the mind of the Second Vatican Council in Spain and that Pope Paul VI had defined the Catholic unity of Spain as the "most precious gift." Adhesion to the tribute was also transmitted by the Vázquez de Mella Circles and the Brotherhoods of Ex-Combatants of the Requetés Tercios, the National Council of the Traditionalist Communion, General José Díaz de Villegas, Ignacio Romero Raizábal, Antonio Lizarza, José Sequeiros, Ramón Tatay, María Amparo Munilla, Fr. Jesús González-Quevedo, Pascual Agramunt, Abelardo de Carlos, and Francisco de Asís Patiño Valero.) although, according to the Official Gazette of the Spanish Cortes, between nine and eleven ultimately voted against the final text.

Following the approval of the Law on Religious Freedom on 28 June 1967, the principle known as Catholic unity ceased to have legal effect in Spain, and Protestant representatives publicly expressed their gratitude to Castiella. In December 1968, the Franco government repealed the edict of expulsion of the Jews by the Catholic Monarchs and inaugurated a new Sephardic synagogue in central Madrid.

Although the religious freedom law adopted by the Francoist Cortes was presented as compatible with the Catholic confessional character of the State, the conciliar declaration generated unease and uncertainty among leaders of the Traditionalist Communion. The integrist wing of traditionalism continued to advocate the restoration of Catholic unity, a position reflected in publications such as the magazine ¿Qué pasa?, which adopted a critical stance toward the post-conciliar Church, and in the activities of the Centro de Estudios Históricos y Políticos General Zumalacárregui, directed by Francisco Elías de Tejada, including the Traditionalist Studies Congresses of 1964 and 1968. Similar positions were maintained by other Carlist groups that rejected the ideological shift introduced by Carlos Hugo de Borbón-Parma. The Spanish Priestly Brotherhood, established after the Second Vatican Council, also lamented the disappearance of Catholic unity in Spain and expressed the desire for its restoration.

=== Democracy of 1978 ===
After the dissolution of the Francoist regime, religious freedom was recognized as a fundamental right in Article 16 of the Spanish Constitution of 1978, which also established the non-confessional character of the State. This provision was subsequently implemented by Organic Law 7/1980 of 5 July on Religious Freedom and further developed by Royal Decree 142/1981 of 9 January, concerning the organization and functioning of the Registry of Religious Entities, and Royal Decree 1980/1981 of 19 June, on the establishment of the Advisory Commission on Religious Freedom.

In 1989, on the occasion of the 14th Centenary of the Third Council of Toledo, the magazine Iglesia-Mundo published a special issue in defense of the Catholic unity of Spain. Contributions were made by, among others, José Orlandis, Tomás Marín, Rafael Gambra, Mons. Emilio Silva de Castro, Victorino Rodríguez, Álvaro d'Ors and the Bishop of Cuenca José Guerra Campos, under the direction of Miguel Ayuso.

In 2007, the Fundación Elías de Tejada established the Center for Studies for the Defense of the Catholic Unity of Spain. The center, presided over by Alberto Ruiz de Galarreta and composed of José Miguel Gambra Gutiérrez and Miguel Ayuso, defined its purpose as the defense and promotion of the Catholic unity of Spain, understood as the sociological and legal situation in which the Catholic religion is regarded as the only religion with public relevance and as the foundation of the political community.

== See also ==
- Catholic Church in Spain
- Religion in Spain
- History of Christianity in Spain
- Spanish Inquisition

== Bibliography ==
- Marqués de Miraflores (1834). Apuntes histórico-críticos para escribir la historia de la revolucion de España, desde el año 1820 hasta 1823 [Historical-Critical Notes to Write the History of the Revolution in Spain, from 1820 to 1823]. London: Oficina de Ricardo Taylor.
- Balmes, Jaime (1852). El Protestantismo comparado con el Catolicismo. Tomo I [Protestantism Compared with Catholicism. Volume I]. Paris: Librería de Garnier Hermanos.
- Tejada y Ramiro, Juan (1862). Coleccion completa de concordatos españoles [Complete Collection of Spanish Concordats]. Madrid: Imprenta de D. Pedro Montero.
- De la Fuente, Vicente (1875). Historia eclesiástica de España. Tomo VI [Ecclesiastical History of Spain. Volume VI]. Madrid: Compañía de impresores y libreros del Reino.
- García Rodrigo, Francisco Javier (1876). Historia verdadera de la Inquisición. Tomo I [True History of the Inquisition. Volume I]. Madrid: Alejandro Gómez Fuentenebro.
- Hernández Villaescusa, Modesto (1890). Recaredo y la unidad católica. Estudio histórico-crítico [Reccared and Catholic Unity. Historical-Critical Study] (PDF). Barcelona: La Hormiga de Oro. Archived from the original (PDF) on 13 June 2018.
- Polo y Peyrolón, Manuel (1892). Ligera exposición doctrinal del credo católico-tradicionalista [Brief Doctrinal Exposition of the Catholic-Traditionalist Creed]. Imprenta de Manuel Alufre.
- Tirado y Rojas, Mariano (1892). La masonería en España. Tomo I [Freemasonry in Spain. Volume I]. Madrid: Imprenta de Enrique Maroto y hermano.
- Tirado y Rojas, Mariano (1893). La masonería en España. Tomo II [Freemasonry in Spain. Volume II]. Madrid: Imprenta de Enrique Maroto y hermano.
- Simonet, Francisco Javier (1897). Historia de los mozárabes de España [History of the Mozarabs of Spain]. Madrid: Estab. tip. de la viuda é hijos de M. Tello.
- Espasa-Calpe (1928). "Tolerancia". Enciclopedia Universal Ilustrada Europeo-Americana [Universal Illustrated European-American Encyclopedia]. Vol. Tomo LXII. pp. 502–505.
- Ferrer, Melchor (1959). Historia del tradicionalismo español, tomo 28, vol I [History of Spanish Traditionalism, volume 28, vol I]. Editorial Católica Española, S.A.
- Junta Nacional de la Comunión Tradicionalista (1963). El Carlismo y la Unidad Católica [Carlism and Catholic Unity] (PDF). Archived from the original (PDF) on 2 August 2017 – via Manifesto of the National Junta of the Traditionalist Communion in the name of His Catholic Majesty King Don Javier I.
- Gambra, Rafael (1965). La unidad religiosa y el derrotismo católico [Religious Unity and Catholic Defeatism]. Editorial Católica Española, S. A.
- Gambra, Rafael (1976). Tradición o mimetismo [Tradition or Mimicry]. Madrid: Instituto de Estudios Políticos. ISBN 84-259-0586-9.
- Santa Cruz, Manuel de (1987). Apuntes y Documentos para la Historia del Tradicionalismo español, 1939-1966. Tomo 15: 1953 [Notes and Documents for the History of Spanish Traditionalism, 1939-1966. Volume 15: 1953].
- Sandoval Pinillos, Luis María (1989). "Una opción probada: la unidad católica de España. (A propósito del número monográfico de Iglesia-Mundo, XIV Centenario del III Concilio de Toledo)" [A Proven Option: The Catholic Unity of Spain. (On the Occasion of the Special Issue of Iglesia-Mundo, XIV Centenary of the III Council of Toledo)] (PDF). Verbo (277–278). Speiro: 1187–1194. ISSN 0210-4784.
- Wilhelmsen, Alexandra (1995). La formación del pensamiento político del carlismo, 1810-1875 [The Formation of Carlist Political Thought, 1810-1875]. Actas. ISBN 84-87863-31-0.
- Moliner Prada, Antonio (2000). Fèlix Sardà i Salvany y el integrismo en la Restauración [Fèlix Sardà i Salvany and Integrism in the Restoration]. Universitat Autònoma de Barcelona. ISBN 84-490-1573-1.
- Vilar Ramírez, Juan Bautista (2001). "Los protestantes españoles: La doble lucha por la libertad durante el primer franquismo (1939-1953)" [Spanish Protestants: The Double Struggle for Freedom during the First Francoism (1939-1953)]. Anales de Historia Contemporánea (17). ISSN 0212-6559.
- Cárcel Ortí, Vicente (2002). Historia de la Iglesia en la España contemporánea: Siglos XIX y XX [History of the Church in Contemporary Spain: 19th and 20th Centuries]. Ediciones Palabra. ISBN 84-8239-687-0.
- Canal i Morell, Jordi (2007). "Recaredo contra la revolución: el carlismo y la conmemoración del "XIII Centenario de la Unidad Católica" (1889)" [Reccared Against the Revolution: Carlism and the Commemoration of the "13th Centenary of Catholic Unity" (1889)]. In Carolyn P. Boyd (ed.). Religión y política en la España contemporánea [Religion and Politics in Contemporary Spain] (PDF). Centro de Estudios Políticos y Constitucionales. pp. 249–270. ISBN 978-84-259-1370-9.
- Rozas, Juan Manuel (2011). "La unidad católica en la España de Franco y el tradicionalismo cultural en la obra de Gonzalo Redondo" [Catholic Unity in Franco's Spain and Cultural Traditionalism in the Work of Gonzalo Redondo] (PDF). Anales de la Fundación Francisco Elías de Tejada (17).
- Monroy, Juan Antonio (2015). Un protestante en la España de Franco [A Protestant in Franco's Spain]. Ediciones Noufront. ISBN 978-84-92726-26-4.
- Poutrin, Isabelle (2015). Convertir les musulmans. Espagne, 1491-1609 [Converting Muslims. Spain, 1491-1609]. Paris: Presses Universitaires de France. ISBN 9782130741831.
- Ferrari Cortés, Juan Luis (2015). El pensamiento político de la revista Verbo [The Political Thought of the Verbo Magazine] (PDF). Departamento de Derecho Político. Vol. UNED. Archived from the original (PDF) on 26 June 2018.
- De Lemus Diego, María Teresa (2016). Libertad religiosa, simbología y derecho comparado [Religious Freedom, Symbology, and Comparative Law]. Universidad de Salamanca. ISBN 978-84-9012-576-2.
- Vázquez de Prada, Mercedes (2017). "El tradicionalismo carlista ante la libertad religiosa (1963-1967)" [Carlist Traditionalism Facing Religious Freedom (1963-1967)]. Universidad de Valladolid.
