= Miguel Ayuso =

Spanish jurist and legal academic

Miguel Ayuso Torres
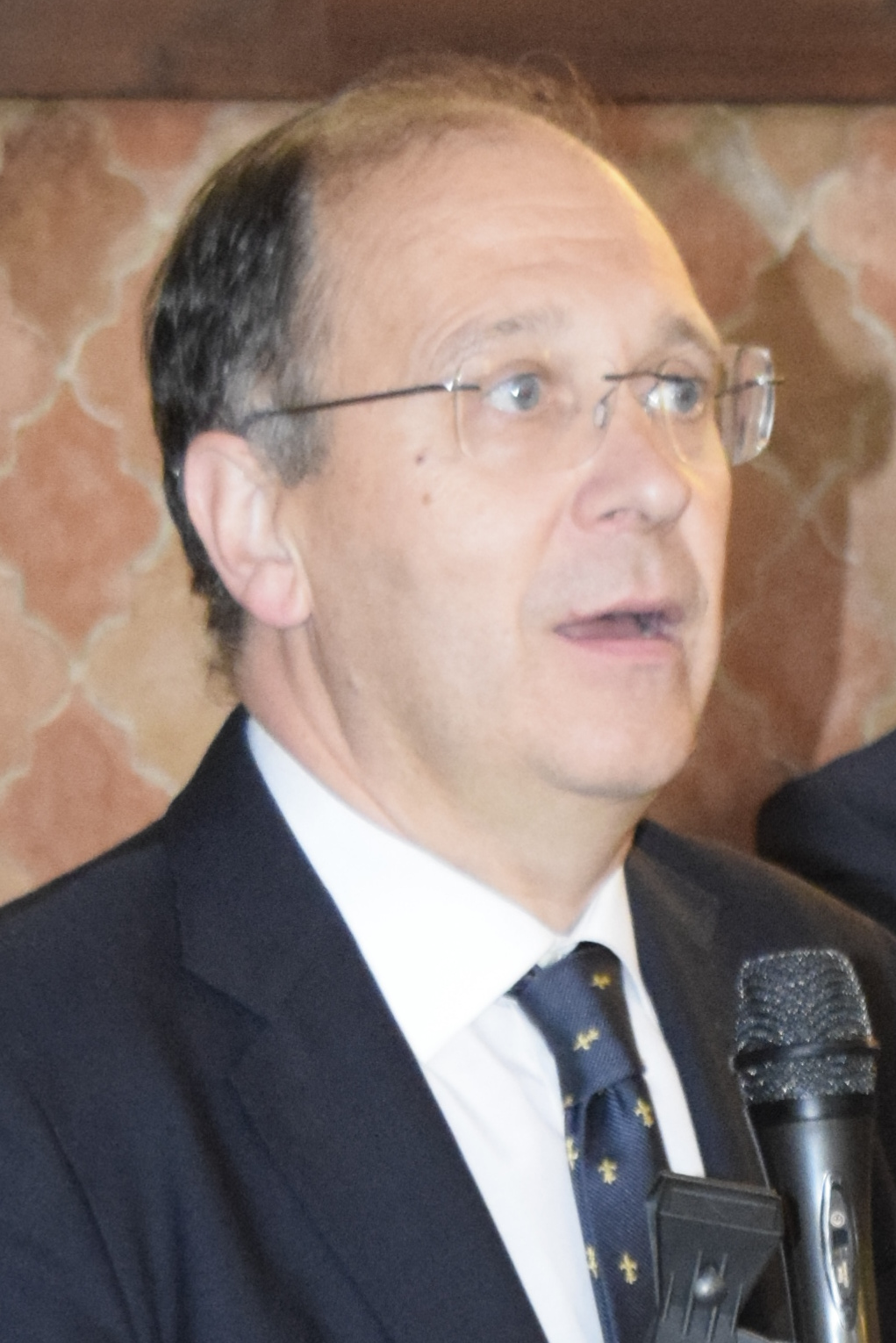

Head of the Political Secretariat of Sixto Enrique de Borbón-Parma
- In office 2004–2010
- Preceded by: Rafael Gambra Ciudad
- Succeeded by: José Miguel Gambra

Personal details
- Born: 1961 (age 64–65) Madrid, Spain
- Party: Traditionalist Communion (2001)
- Education: Doctor of Law
- Alma mater: Pontifical University of Comillas
- Occupation: Jurist, philosopher of law, colonel in the Spanish Army, university professor

Miguel Ayuso Torres (born 1961) is a Spanish jurist and philosopher of law, professor of Political Science and Constitutional Law at the Pontifical University of Comillas in Madrid. A prominent traditionalist thinker and polemicist, he is a disciple of Eugenio Vegas Latapié, a proponent of the legacy of Francisco Elías de Tejada, and a leading figure in the Traditionalist Communion.

He is a corresponding member of the Royal Academy of Jurisprudence and Legislation, the Royal Academy of Sciences, Fine Arts, and Noble Arts of Córdoba, the National Academy of History of Ecuador, the Colombian Academy of Jurisprudence, and the Academia del Plata.

== Biography ==
Born in Madrid in 1961, Ayuso earned a law degree in 1984 and a doctorate in Law in 1993 from the Pontifical University of Comillas. He has served as a war auditor in the Spanish Army since 1984, when he joined the Military Legal Corps through a competitive examination, reaching the rank of colonel in 2013. From 1993 to 2000, he was a lawyer at the Supreme Court.

During the Spanish Transition, he was affiliated with the Traditionalist Communion. He contributed regularly to the magazine Fuerza Nueva until the 1980s and participated in numerous conferences organized by Fuerza Nueva and later by the CESPE, led by Blas Piñar. He also contributed to the bulletin of the Catholic-Monarchist Communion, founded by Francisco Elías de Tejada, under the pseudonym Miguel de Sigüenza. Since 1999, he has collaborated with the University of Guadalajara (Mexico) and the Tecos organization.

He is the scientific director of the Council of Hispanic Studies Felipe II and editor of the journal Verbo, associated with Catholic integrism. Since 1995, he has edited the Annals of the Francisco Elías de Tejada Foundation. He served as head of the Political Secretariat of Sixto Enrique de Borbón-Parma, regent of the Traditionalist Communion, from 2004 to 2010.

In November 2009, he was elected president of the International Union of Catholic Jurists, a position he held until 2019. In the same year (2009), American cardinal Raymond Leo Burke, then Prefect of the Supreme Tribunal of the Apostolic Signatura, was appointed ecclesiastical advisor to the organization.

He has been awarded honorary doctorates by the University of Udine (Italy), the Inca Garcilaso de la Vega University (Peru), and the Polytechnic and Artistic University of Paraguay. He is also an honorary professor at the Autonomous University of Guadalajara (Mexico), the Santo Tomás University (Chile), and the University of San Martín de Porres (Peru). He has served as president of the Political Science Sector Group of the International Federation of Catholic Universities (Paris) and vice-president of the Institute of European Studies "Antonio Rosmini" (Bolzano).

Ayuso was the last disciple of Eugenio Vegas Latapié, founder of the journal Acción Española, with whom he maintained a close friendship. His intellectual mentors also include Juan Vallet de Goytisolo, Álvaro d'Ors, Rafael Gambra, Fr. Victorino Rodríguez, O.P., and especially Francisco Elías de Tejada, whose work he has promoted through the foundation bearing his name. Other influences on his thought include Leopoldo Eulogio Palacios, Vicente Marrero, Francisco Canals Vidal, José Pedro Galvão de Sousa, Frederick Wilhelmsen, Fr. Osvaldo Lira, SS.CC., and Rubén Calderón Bouchet, among others.

Ayuso advocates for a natural law not reduced to human rights and emphasizes the need to explore the foundations of public law beyond constitutionalism. He declares himself a "staunch defender of Catholic unity and the legitimist principle, which he has steadfastly upheld against the deviations of the Second Vatican Council and dynastic falterings, contributing to the preservation of Carlism in its purest form." A supporter of the traditional liturgy of the Catholic Church, he participated in the Fontgombault conferences (2001), presided over by Cardinal Josef Ratzinger.

Between 2010 and 2013, he participated in the television program Lágrimas en la lluvia, hosted by writer Juan Manuel de Prada on Intereconomía. Following his promotion to colonel in 2013, the newspaper El País and the television channel La Sexta published reports—described by Gabriel Ariza as a "harassment campaign"—labeling Ayuso as "ultra" due to his political positions. For statements in which he described the 1978 Constitution as a "pseudo-constitution without principles" and the Law for Political Reform of 1976 as a "trap," a disciplinary file was opened against him in the Army, which, according to El País, was later closed as his statements were deemed protected by freedom of expression. Following these events, he transitioned to the reserve.

== Recognitions ==
- Honorary doctorate from the University of Udine (Italy).
- Honorary doctorate from the Inca Garcilaso de la Vega University (Peru).
- Honorary doctorate from the Polytechnic and Artistic University of Paraguay (Paraguay).
- Honorary professor at the Autonomous University of Guadalajara (Mexico).
- Honorary professor at the Santo Tomás University (Chile).
- Honorary professor at the University of San Martín de Porres (Peru).

== Distinctions ==
- Corresponding member of the Royal Academy of Jurisprudence and Legislation.
- Corresponding member of the Royal Academy of Sciences, Fine Arts, and Noble Arts of Córdoba.

== Works ==
Ayuso is the author of over thirty books, sixty chapters in collective works, and three hundred articles in specialized journals. He has also occasionally contributed to journalism, primarily in Iglesia-Mundo—where he was part of the editorial board— El Pensamiento Navarro in Pamplona, and ABC in Madrid, as well as in El Mercurio in Santiago, Chile, La Nación in Buenos Aires, and La Razón in Lima.

=== Books ===
- The work of Vicente Marrero as seen by critics (Las Palmas, 1989).
- Brief, succinct, and direct account of the first of the journeys that brought fame to Licentiate Ayuso and Bachelor Cayón (Tolosa, 1990).
- The juridical and political philosophy of Francisco Elías de Tejada (Madrid, 1994).
- After the Leviathan? On the State and its sign (Madrid, 1998).
- Koinos. The political thought of Rafael Gambra (Madrid, 1998).
- Chesterton, knight errant (Buenos Aires, 2001).
- Hispanic natural law: past and present (Córdoba, 2001).
- The head of the Gorgon. From the hubris of power to modern totalitarianism (Buenos Aires, 2001).
- The walls of the City. Themes of Hispanic traditionalist thought (Buenos Aires, 2001).
- From law to law. Five lessons on legality and legitimacy (Madrid, 2001). Translated into French (Paris, 2008).
- L'Àgora e la piramide. A problematic "reading" of the Spanish constitution (2004).
- Decline or eclipse of the state? The transformations of public law in the era of globalization (2005).
- What is Carlism: an introduction to Hispanic traditionalism (Buenos Aires, 2005).
- From legal state geometry to the rediscovery of law and politics. Studies in honor of Francesco Gentile (2006).
- Politics, the craft of the soul (Buenos Aires, 2007).
- Carlism for Spanish Americans. Foundations of the political unity of Hispanic peoples (Buenos Aires, 2007).
- State in crisis and globalization (Paris, 2007).
- The Christian constitution of states (2008).
- The State in its labyrinth (2011).
- Constitution. The problem and its problems (2016).
- Hispanidad as a problem: History, culture, and politics (Madrid, 2018).
- Political tradition and Hispanidad (2020).
- From crisis to exception (and back). Political-legal profiles (2021).
- Christian public law in Spain (1961-2021). Sixty years of the Catholic City and the Verbo journal (Madrid, 2022).
- Morality, ethics, and politics (2023).
- The dissolution of politics in the era of posthumanism (2023).
- Natural law. Defenders and impostors (2024).
- Limitations and flaws of conservative "anti-modernity" (2025).

He also wrote the prologue to the book Traditional Nature. History, principles, and applications for conservation by Juan Andrés Oria de Rueda, doctor of forestry engineering from the Technical University of Madrid and professor of Forest Botany, Applied Mycology, and Protected Flora Conservation at the University of Valladolid.

=== Contributions to collective works ===
In addition to his own books, he has edited and contributed to the following collective works:

- Human community and political tradition. "Liber amicorum" for Rafael Gambra (Madrid, 1998).
- Fundamental questions of natural law. Proceedings of the III Hispanic Natural Law Conferences (Guadalajara, Mexico, November 26-28, 2008) (2009).
- State, law, and conscience (2010).
- 175 years of Carlism. A revision of Hispanic political tradition (2011).
- The problem of constituent power. Constitution, sovereignty, and representation in the era of transitions (2012).
- The common good. Current issues and political-legal implications (2013).
- Church and politics. Changing the paradigm (2013), co-edited with Bernard Dumont and Danilo Castellano.
- Utrumque ius. Law, natural law, and canon law (2015).
- On marriage (2015).
- Political-legal consequences of Protestantism. 500 years after Luther (2016).
- From "advanced" democracy to "proclaimed" democracy (2018).
- Transhumanism or posthumanity? Politics and law after humanism (2019).
- Self-determination. Legal and political problems (2020).
- Natural law and economy. Catholic economics in light of natural law and the social doctrine of the Church, facing current problems (2021).
- The two powers. 150 years after the breach of Porta Pia (2021).
- The crisis of Catholic political culture (2021).
- Politics and law in the face of contemporary secularism (2022).
- José Pancorvo. Poet and mystic of the Incarrey (2022), co-edited with Fernán Altuve-Febres Lores.
- Baroque and Hispanidad. Political-legal profiles (2022).
- Gabriel García Moreno, the statesman and the man. Reflections on the bicentennial of his birth (2023), co-edited with Álvaro R. Mejía Salazar.
- The problem of human rights. History, philosophy, politics, and law (2023).
- Experience, political doctrines, and public law. The historical-philosophical reading of Juan Fernando Segovia (2023).
- Christ the King. Theology, philosophy, and politics on the centenary of the encyclical Quas Primas (2024).
- The work of the Catholic City in contemporary Catholic culture (2024).
- Natural law against natural law? History and balance of a problem (2024).
- Rationality, order, and truth of law and politics. Studies in honor of Danilo Castellano (2025).
- Person and law (2025).

== Bibliography ==
- Dookhy, Riyad (2015). "Miguel Ayuso, Appeal of the soul and political vocation". Revue des sciences religieuses (in French) (89/2): 242–243. doi:10.4000/rsr.2592.
- Ferrari Cortés, Juan Luis (2015). "Miguel Ayuso". The political thought of the journal Verbo (PDF). Vol. UNED. Madrid: Department of Political Law.
