= Gerardo Salvador Merino =

Spanish politician and notary (1910–1971)

National Delegate of the Spanish Syndical Organization
- In office 9 September 1939 – 13 September 1941
- Leader: Francisco Franco
- Preceded by: Position established
- Succeeded by: Manuel Valdés Larrañaga (acting); Fermín Sanz-Orrio

Personal details
- Born: 8 September 1910 Herrera de Pisuerga, Spain
- Died: 31 July 1971 (aged 60) Barcelona, Spain
- Party: FET y de las JONS (until 1941)
- Other political affiliations: Falange Española de las JONS
- Spouse: María Fermina Coderch de Sentmenat
- Relatives: José Antonio Coderch (brother-in-law)
- Education: Central University of Madrid
- Occupation: Politician, notary

Gerardo Salvador Merino (8 September 1910 – 31 July 1971) was a Spanish Falangist politician and notary, who served as the first leader of the Spanish Syndical Organization (Organización Sindical Española; OSE).

Salvador Merino was a supporter of Manuel Hedilla during the Spanish Civil War; later, during the first years of the Francoist dictatorship, he played a prominent role in collaboration with Nazi Germany from his position as the leader of the OSE. Considered an ambitious person, he managed to amass great power in his rise within the Francoist administration, but he also made numerous enemies. He continued to maintain great power and political influence until mid-1941, when an accusation of having belonged to Freemasonry led to his immediate fall from grace. Away from the circles of power, he dedicated himself to business activities for the rest of his life.

== Biography ==
=== Early years ===
Salvador Merino was born on 8 September 1910 in the town of Herrera de Pisuerga, in the province of Palencia. His parents owned a mill in their hometown. During the first months of the Second Spanish Republic he joined the UGT trade union, becoming a member of its most radical wing. According to some authors, it appears he may have also been a member of the PSOE. In May 1933, an attack against his father—mayor and CEDA activist— led to the mistaken death of his mother, an event that probably marked his later political path. Moved to Madrid, he studied law at the Central University, (Note: Although he initially studied at the Real Centro Universitario Escorial-Maria Christina, in El Escorial, where he met Dionisio Ridruejo.) becoming a member of the FUE. In the capital, he frequented the gatherings at Café Lion, where, in late 1933, he met José Antonio Primo de Rivera; he struck up a friendship with him, and it was Primo de Rivera who encouraged him to get involved with the Falange Española (FE). Affiliated with FE in January 1934, he was responsible for accentuating the worker and union wing of the party. After finishing his law degree, in 1935 he obtained a position as a notary in Puentes de García Rodríguez in Galicia, where he assumed the local leadership of the Falange.

=== Civil War ===
After the outbreak of the Spanish Civil War, he fought on the Asturias front, being wounded a couple of times. A supporter of Manuel Hedilla, in 1937 he was appointed by him as provincial leader of the Falange in La Coruña. He soon became unpopular among the middle class for his workerist dialectics, having coined the slogan "Down with the bourgeoisie". During his time in Galicia he maintained a close friendship with Germán Álvarez de Sotomayor. A good speaker and with good organizational skills, in 1938 he managed to gather a crowd of Falangists in the bullring of La Coruña, inviting General Juan Yagüe, who ardently claimed the national-syndicalist revolution; this speech would have earned Gerardo Salvador his immediate dismissal from office. Shortly thereafter, he joined the Nationalist army, remaining at the front during the final year of the war. In March 1939 he participated in the expedition of the ship Castillo de Olite, sunk by the Republicans, although Salvador Merino managed to save his life.

=== National Union Delegate ===
After the end of the civil war, in a context of tendency towards fascism of the regime, on 9 September 1939, he was appointed National Union Delegate, the position separated from the defunct Ministry of Trade Union Organization and Action (Note: At its helm had been the "neo-Falangist" Pedro González Bueno, between 1938 and 1939.) which controlled the entire trade union structure. Unlike other leaders of FET y de las JONS, Salvador Merino was granted express powers to organize the new unions. Throughout the following months, October and November, he dedicated himself to the task of building the union administrative structure, eventually incorporating part of the cadres from former union organizations. During November he made a large number of appointments, including 35 new provincial delegates. His populist and revolutionary rhetoric soon made him one of the most important figures within the Falangist hierarchy, which in turn also led to numerous conflicts with other Francoist leaders.

In addition to his position as the National Union Delegate, he was also a member of the National Council of the Movement. Within the party Gerardo Salvador did not clearly identify with any internal faction, although he felt closer to Falangist soldiers such as Juan Yagüe or Agustín Muñoz Grandes.

One of Salvador Merino's first objectives was to mobilize the union organization to confront rampant unemployment, which in 1940 reached official figures of 500,000 unemployed people; he gave directives to his provincial delegates to propose employment plans. At the initiative of Salvador Merino, on 26 January 1940, the Francoist regime promulgated the new Union Unity Law which established that businessmen and workers would be integrated into a single Spanish Syndical Organization (Organización Sindical Española; OSE) under the command of FET y de las JONS. However, Gerardo Salvador was in favor of union autonomy with respect to the rest of the Movimiento Nacional. As part of the new union framework, in the spring of 1940 he launched a new newspaper that became the Pueblo newspaper in June.

On 31 March 1940, during the first anniversary of the Nationalist victory in the Civil War, he managed to summon and gather a large mass of workers parading through Madrid, provoking the anger of the most right-wing sectors of the Francoist regime. Salvador Merino's activities and ambitions earned him a good number of enemies among Francoist leaders, many of whom saw him as a subversive fascist and a "crypto-red". Within the Spanish Army he had the visceral opposition, among others, of General Andrés Saliquet. Aware of his political infeasibility, Ramón Serrano Suñer even offered him the possibility of occupying the Labour portfolio, although Salvador rejected this proposal considering that this would imply losing control over the OSE. (Note: Serrano Suñer insisted on his proposal and asked Salvador what position he would be willing to accept, to which he responded that he would only accept the position of Minister of the Government—which was vacant at the time—if it also included holding the General Secretariat of FET y de las JONS.)

Openly sympathetic to Nazi Germany, coinciding with the early years of World War II, he played a prominent role in Spanish–German relations. Like Pedro Gamero del Castillo, Salvador Merino maintained close contacts with the Nazis. In October 1940 he was one of the leaders of the regime that received Nazi leader Heinrich Himmler in Madrid, during his visit to Spain. However, Salvador Merino maintained these contacts directly, without doing so through normal channels of the Servicio Exterior de Falange, which represented a challenge to the party's procedures. The head of the Nazi Party in Madrid, Hans Thomsen, made arrangements so that Merino could make a special visit to Germany. In April 1941 he travelled to Germany, where he was impressed by the Nazi union model; he met with Rudolf Hess, Robert Ley, Joachim von Ribbentrop and Joseph Goebbels. According to what his enemies then propagated among the power circles of Madrid, in reality Gerardo Salvador had gone to Germany to gather support for a coup d'état.

=== Fall from grace ===
Increasingly lacking support within the Francoist hierarchy—due to his populist, national-syndicalist rhetoric and his closeness to the Nazis—he was ousted from the leadership of the OSE in September 1941. According to some authors, one of the reasons for his dismissal would have been the pact he had signed on 21 August with the leader of the German Labour Front (Deutsche Arbeitsfront; DAF), Robert Ley, to send 100,000 workers to Germany, although the agreement would subsequently be renegotiated and the number of workers reduced to 15,000. However, the main reason for his downfall was the discovery of his past as a "Freemason". According to historian Stanley G. Payne, General Saliquet would have been the main person responsible for the appearance of evidence about the Masonic past of Salvador Merino. Other authors point to the involvement of British intelligence agents in his downfall, an action that may have been linked to him being an overt Germanophile.

The trial against Salvador Merino began in July 1941, coinciding with his honeymoon in Mallorca. Merino returned to Madrid quickly and rejected the accusations. Despite the situation created, he maintained his position as the leader of the OSE, although suspended from his duties; Germán Álvarez de Sotomayor, his second-in-command, assumed the temporary leadership. Finally, at the beginning of September he asked Serrano Suñer —president of the Falange Political Board— to accept his resignation. He was replaced by another Falangist, Manuel Valdés Larrañaga, in acting capacity. (Note: Manuel Valdés carried out a purge within the trade union hierarchy, expelling many of the leaders who were loyal to Salvador Merino. While taming the unruly unions, he also reorganized their internal structure and imbued the union organization with a more conservative and religious character.)

In that context, one cabinet member even went so far as to call for Salvador Merino to be executed by firing squad. On 30 October, the Tribunal for the Repression of Freemasonry and Communism sentenced him to twelve years in prison, although the sentence would be commuted to twelve years of internal exile by the council of ministers.

=== Later life ===
After his fall from grace, he was expelled from the party and confined to the Balearic Islands. (Note: Although other sources indicate that he was exiled to the town of Palafrugell, in the province of Girona.) With the change of course of World War II he was even further removed from the circles of power. However, he would later find work as a consultant in the Catalan textile industry. Away from politics, he dedicated himself to the business world; in the 1960s and 1970s he would become managing director of Motor Ibérica. He died on 31 July 1971.

== Personal life ==
He married María Fermina Coderch de Sentmenat, sister of architect José Antonio Coderch.

== Works ==
- (in Spanish) La Falange y su contribución al problema del campo. Antología. Gráficas Reunidas. 1941.

== Bibliography ==
- Amaya Quer, Àlex (2012). ""Unidad, totalidad y jerarquía": continuidades y rupturas en la teoría y la praxis de la organización sindical española, 1939–1969". Historia y política: Ideas, procesos y movimientos sociales (in Spanish) (28). Madrid: UCM, UNED and CEPC: 305–331. ISSN 1575-0361.
- Bardavío, Joaquín; Sinova, Justino (2000). Todo Franco. Franquismo y antifranquismo de la A a la Z (in Spanish). Barcelona: Plaza & Janés.
- Bowen, Wayne H. (2000). Spaniards and Nazi Germany: Collaboration in the New Order. University of Missouri Press.
- Bowen, Wayne H. (2006). Spain During World War II. University of Missouri Press.
- Bowen, Wayne H. (2009). "Spanish Pilgrimages to Hitler's Germany: Emissaries of the New Order". The Historian. 71 (2): 258–279. doi:10.1111/j.1540-6563.2009.00237.x. ISSN 0018-2370.
- Cazorla Sánchez, Antonio (2000). Las políticas de la victoria: La consolidación del Nuevo Estado franquista (1938–1953) (in Spanish). Madrid: Marcial Pons. ISBN 84-95379-19-8.
- Clarà, Josep (1999). El partit únic. La Falange i el Movimiento a Girona (1935–1977) (in Catalan). Cercle d'Estudis Històrics i Socials.
- Domínguez Arribas, Javier (2009). El enemigo judeo-masónico en la propaganda franquista, 1936–1945 (in Spanish). Madrid: Marcial Pons Historia. ISBN 978-84-96467-98-9.
- Fernández, Carlos (2000). Alzamiento y guerra civil en Galicia: 1936–1939 (in Spanish). Vol. II. Ediciós do Castro.
- Gil Pecharromán, Julio (2008). Con permiso de la autoridad. La España de Franco (1939–1975) (in Spanish). Madrid: Temas de Hoy.
- Gil Pecharromán, Julio (2013). El Movimiento Nacional (1937–1977) (in Spanish). Barcelona: Grupo Planeta. ISBN 978-84-08-12138-1.
- Giralt, Emili (1981). La Compañía General de Tabacos de Filipinas, 1881–1981 (in Spanish). Barcelona: Compañía General de Tabacos de Filipinas.
- Lazo, Alfonso (2008). Una familia mal avenida. Falange, Iglesia y Ejército (in Spanish). Madrid: Síntesis. ISBN 978-84-9756-552-3.
- Marín, José María; Molinero, Carme; Ysàs, Pere (2010) [2001]. Historia política de España, 1939–2000 (in Spanish). Vol. II. Madrid: Istmo.
- Martín de Pozuelo, Eduardo; Ellakuría, Iñaki (2008). La guerra ignorada: los espías españoles que combatieron a los nazis (in Spanish). Barcelona: Random House Mondadori. ISBN 978-84-8306-768-0.
- Molinero, Carme (2005). La captación de las masas. Política social y propaganda en el régimen franquista (in Spanish). Cátedra.
- Morente, Francisco (2005). "Hijos de un Dios menor: la Falange después de José Antonio". Fascismo en España: ensayos sobre los orígenes sociales y culturales del franquismo (in Spanish). En: Ferran Gallego y Francisco Morente (Eds.). Barcelona: El Viejo Topo: 211–250. ISBN 84-96356-32-9.
- Payne, Stanley G. (1961). Falange. A History of Spanish Fascism. Stanford University Press.
- Payne, Stanley G. (1999). Fascism in Spain, 1923–1977. Madison: University of Wisconsin Press.
- Rodríguez Jiménez, José Luis (2002). Los esclavos españoles de Hitler (in Spanish). Barcelona: Planeta.
- Ruhl, Klaus-Jörg (1986). Franco, Falange y «Tercer Reich»: España en la Segunda Guerra Mundial (in Spanish). Tres Cantos: Akal.
- Ruiz, Julius (2005). Franco's Justice: Repression In Madrid After The Spanish Civil War. Oxford. ISBN 0-19-928183-1.
- Sevillano, Francisco (2014). "La masonería y la imagen del enemigo: el caso de Gerardo Salvador Merino, odio y afinidades electivas en el «nuevo Estado» español (1939–1941)" (PDF). Iberic@l (in Spanish) (6). París: Centre de recherches interdisciplinaires sur les mondes ibériques contemporains: 105–115. ISSN 2260-2534.
- Suárez Fernández, Luis; Espadas Burgos, Manuel (1991). Historia general de España y América – La Época de Franco. Tomo XIX. 2 (in Spanish). Madrid: Ediciones Rial.
- Suárez Fernández, Luis (2011). Franco. Los años decisivos. 1931–1945 (in Spanish). Barcelona: Ariel.
- Thomàs, Joan Maria (1999). "La configuración del franquismo. El partido y las instituciones" (PDF). Ayer (in Spanish) (33). Madrid: Asociación de Historia Contemporánea y Marcial Pons Historia: 41–63. ISSN 1134-2277. Archived from the original (PDF) on 2 February 2017.
- Thomàs, Joan Maria (2001). La Falange de Franco: fascismo y fascistización en el régimen franquista, 1937–1945 (in Spanish). Barcelona: Plaza & Janés.
- Togores, Luis (2010). Yagüe, el general falangista de Franco (in Spanish). Madrid: La Esfera de los Libros.
- Urquijo Goitia, José Ramón (2008) [2001]. Gobiernos y ministros españoles en la edad contemporánea (in Spanish). Madrid: CSIC.

Trade union offices
New title	National Delegate of the Spanish Syndical Organization; 1939–1941	Succeeded by Manuel Valdés Larrañaga; Acting
