= Songs of the Spanish Civil War =

Folk songs and anthems brought by fighters

"Los Cuatro Generales" and "Viva La Quince Brigada"
Two folk songs from the Spanish Civil War sung by Leon Lishner.

Songs of the Spanish Civil War were folk songs and anthems brought by fighters on both sides of the War. The songs were adapted into marching songs, or sung around campfires.

== Traditional ==
=== Songs of the Republican side ===
- ¡Ay Carmela!, also known as El Paso del Ebro, - Republican song
- Eusko Gudariak ("Basque Soldiers") - anthem of the Basque Autonomous Army
- Los cuatro generales, also known as El Puente de los Franceses, based on Los cuatro muleros by Federico García Lorca with lyrics by Ernst Busch
- El Himno de Riego - anthem of the Spanish Republic
- A Las Barricadas - Spanish anarchist anthem, an adaptation of Russian/Polish march "The Varsovian"
- Hijos del pueblo - Another anarchist anthem
- Si me quieres escribir, also known as El Frente de Gandesa - Republican song
- The Internationale - Socialist anthem
- Jarama Valley - Republican song
- Spaniens Himmel - "Spain's heaven spreads its brightest stars ..."
- El quinto regimiento - Republican adaptation of two popular songs, "El Vito" and "Anda jaleo".
- Viva la FAI - Anarchist anthem
- En la Plaza de mi Pueblo -Republican adaptation of the popular song "El Café de Chinitas"
- Arroja la bomba - composed in 1932, by an Aragonese anarchist named Aznar, in response to the torture to which he was subjected by police in Barcelona. A more moderate, non-violent version was also written, by the name "Luchemos obreros" ("Let's fight/struggle workers").

=== Songs of the Nationalist side ===
- La Marcha Real - Anthem of Francoist Spain
- Cantos nacionales ("national songs") were accorded special honors.
  - Oriamendi - Carlist anthem
  - Cara al Sol - Falangist anthem
  - Cancion del Legionario - Song of the Spanish Legion
- Camisa Azul - Falangist Song
- Ya Hemos Pasao - Celia Gamez
- Falangista Soy - Falangist Song
- Cálzame las Alpargatas - Carlist Song
- Arriba España - Italian Song.
- Se Franco Vogliamo Seguire - Italian Song.
- Avanti Falangista - Italian Song.
- Parademarsch der Legion Condor - German Song.
- Por el Río Nervión - Carlist Song.

== Retrospective ==
- "Juanita" - Björn Afzelius
- "1936, The Spanish Revolution" - The Ex
- "Viva la Quinta Brigada" (later retitled "Viva la Quince Brigada") - Christy Moore's tribute to the fallen Irish
- "The Folk Song Army" -- Tom Lehrer
- "Civil War in Spain" - Joe Mulheron (Derry, Northern Ireland) later covered by Pòl Mac Adaim (Belfast)
- "Spanish Bombs" - The Clash
- "Lorca's Novena" - The Pogues
- "Life During Wartime" - Talking Heads
- "If You Tolerate This Your Children Will Be Next" - Manic Street Preachers
- Spain in My Heart: Songs of the Spanish Civil War (Various artists) (2007) —with contributions by Pete Seeger, Arlo Guthrie, Joel Rafael and Aoife (Finnes) Clancy (from Cherish the Ladies).
- "On the Border" (Al Stewart) (1977) Year of the Cat album.
- "Always the Cause" (Al Stewart) (1995) Between the Wars
- Flowers from Exile album by Rome
- "Guernica" by The Cinematics (2010)
- "The Last Lincoln Veteran" by David Rovics

== See also ==
- Canciones de la Guerra Civil Española album
- Pete Seeger (section 'Spanish Civil War songs')
- Ernst Busch (actor)
- Music of the American Civil War
