= Eusko Gudariak =

Eusko Gudariak (originally spelt Euzko Gudariak, "Basque Soldiers") was the republican anthem of the Eusko Gudarostea, the army of the Basque Autonomous Government during the Spanish Civil War. The song used to refer to the defense of the Basque country within the Republic of Spain against the nationalist Spain army.

It is also used as an anthem by ETA and the organizations orbiting the Basque National Liberation Movement.

The music is a traditional Basque tune from Araba, named Atzo Bilbon nengoan. The lyrics were composed in 1932 by José María de Gárate, an officer of the EAJ-PNV. During the war, Captain Alejandro Lizaso Eizmendi added some verses.

Basque

Euzko Gudariak gera
Euskadi askatzeko
Gerturik daukagu odola
bere aldez emateko

Irrintzi bat entzunda
mendi tontorrean
goazen gudari danok
Ikurriñan atzean

English translation

We are the Basque Soldiers
to free the Basque Country
we have ready our blood
to give it for it

An irrintzi^{1} has been heard
on the top of the mountain,
let's go, all the soldiers
behind the Basque flag

^{1} Irrintzi, literally "neigh", is a high-pitched scream used in celebrations and to call others at long distances.

== See also ==
- Gernikako arbola, a traditional Basque anthem
- Gora ta gora, official Basque anthem
- Oriamendi, a traditional Carlist anthem
- El Himno de Riego, the anthem of the Second Spanish Republic
- A Las Barricadas, Spanish anarchist anthem
- Marcha Real, the anthem of Francoist Spain and the Kingdom of Spain
- Cara al sol, the Falange anthem
- The Internationale, socialist anthem
