= Pedro González Bueno =

Spanish politician

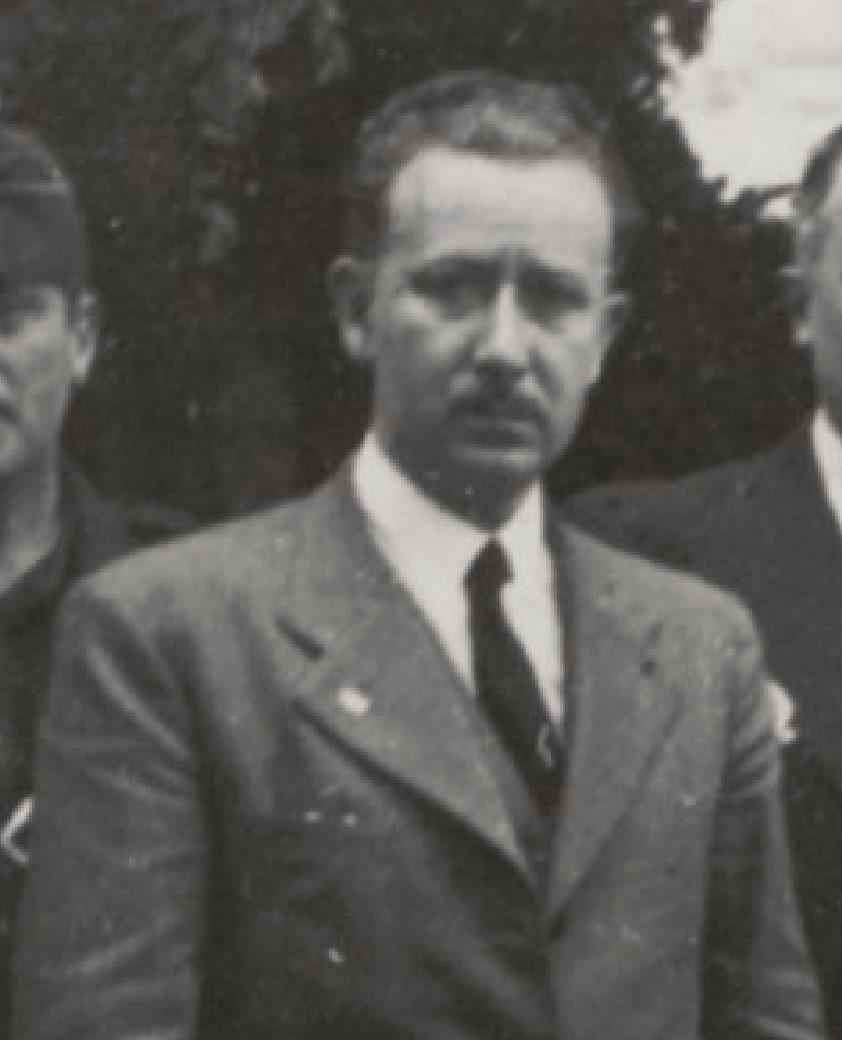

Minister of Trade Union Organization and Action of Spain
- In office 31 January 1938 – 9 August 1939
- Prime Minister: Francisco Franco
- Preceded by: Office established
- Succeeded by: Joaquín Benjumea (Labour; interim)

Personal details
- Born: Pedro González-Bueno y Bocos; 12 January 1896 Madrid, Kingdom of Spain
- Died: 30 January 1985 (aged 89) Madrid, Spain
- Party: FET y de las JONS (National Movement)

Pedro González-Bueno y Bocos (12 January 1896 – 30 January 1985), most commonly known as Pedro González Bueno, was a Spanish politician who served as Minister of Trade Union Organization and Action of Spain between 1938 and 1939, during the Francoist dictatorship.

== Biography ==
Born on 12 January 1896 in Madrid, Pedro González Bueno y Bocos studied at the Free Institution of Education. He graduated as a civil engineer in roads, canals and ports in 1919. A personal friend of Juan de la Cierva, with whom he was a fellow student at the Escuela Especial de Ingenieros de Caminos, and of José Calvo Sotelo, he was part of the group of personalities who signed the founding manifesto of the Bloque Nacional, a right-wing monarchist coalition during the Second Spanish Republic. On a professional level, González Bueno worked in the management of the Sociedad Ibérica de Construcciones Eléctricas, a company he took over after the assassination in 1936 of its president Luis Sánchez Cuervo.

González Bueno, who settled in Navarre in 1936, collaborated with General Emilio Mola in the preparation of the coup d'état that led to the outbreak of the Spanish Civil War. Although he had been an Alfonso monarchist until the outbreak of the conflict, he later joined the Spanish Falange. In April 1937, after the promulgation of the unification decree and the creation of the FET y de las JONS, Franco appointed González Bueno as a member of the political secretariat of the new party. A man close to Ramón Serrano Súñer, González Bueno became a minister in the first Franco government and obtained the portfolio of Organizations and Trade Union Action between January 1938 and August 1939. This new ministry assumed the functions of the former Ministry of Labor. As a minister, he promulgated the Labor Charter and initiated what would lead to the creation of the Vertical Union in 1940. The creation of the Instituto Nacional de la Vivienda and the labor courts were also his work.

After leaving his post in 1939, because he was opposed to the totalitarian aspects of Falangist economic planning, he no longer held any important political position. The union functions were assumed by the new Delegación Nacional de Sindicatos, which depended on the single party of the FET y de las JONS, detached from the now defunct Ministry of Organization and Union Action and led by the Falangist Gerardo Salvador Merino.

During the Franco regime, González Bueno held other positions. He was a member of the National Council of the FET y de las JONS and procurador in the Francoist Cortes. He was also president of the Labour Commission of the Institute for the Rationalisation of Labour and a member of the board of directors of Renfe, a company of which he was also vice-president for a time. In 1945, he drew up a plan for the electrification of the railways, which was the subject of a law adopted in April 1946. He then returned to the private sector, where he was successively head of several companies. He died in Madrid on 30 January 1985.
