= Falange Militia =

Far-right paramilitary militia in 1930s Spain

- Yoke and arrows
- Dates active: 1934/1937 – 1977
- Country: Spain
- Allegiance: FE de las JONS / FET y de las JONS
- Ideology: Falangism
- Political position: Far-right
- Status: Dissolved
- Part of: FE de las JONS / FET y de las JONS

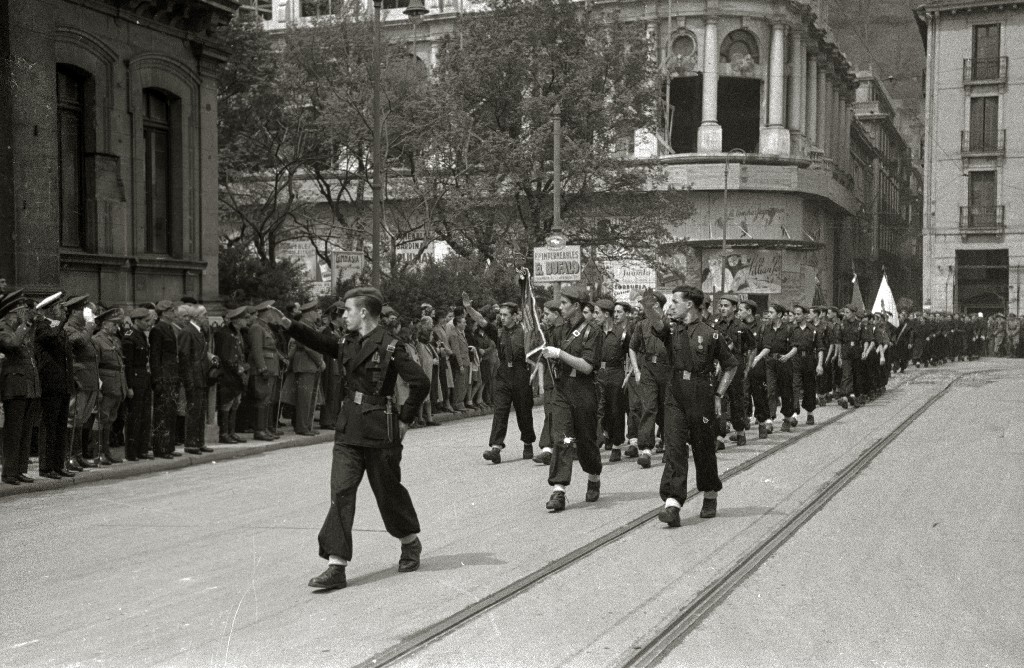
Blueshirt militants during a ceremony in homage to José Antonio Primo de Rivera, 1941.

The Blueshirts (Spanish: Camisas Azules) were the Falangist paramilitary militia in Spain. The name refers to the blue uniform worn by members of the militia. The colour blue was chosen for the uniforms in 1934 by the FE de las JONS because it was, according to José Antonio Primo de Rivera, "clear, whole, and proletarian," and is the colour typically worn by workers, as the Falange sought to gain support among the Spanish working class.

In Francoist Spain the Blueshirts were officially reorganized and officially renamed the Falange Militia of the FET y de las JONS in 1940, combining blue shirts with Carlist's red berets.

== Ranks and insignia ==
The Blueshirts had its own insignia, based on yokes and arrows of different colors, indicating the rank held within the party organization. When the military operations by the Falange Española militias began, these insignia, in their red and silver colors, were used for positions of military command, worn on the left pocket over black or dark blue rectangles. When, by order of General Francisco Franco, the Army's insignia were adopted for all militias, prohibiting the use of individual insignia, even though stars and stripes were adopted, the yoke and arrows continued to be used, but these were now worn below the pocket, leaving the area above it for the official insignia, which were worn on red or black cloth.

In addition to the red and silver insignia of the front-line Blueshirts, there were other similar ones (yokes and arrows), but in green or gold, which corresponded to political or rear-guard positions.

=== Officers ===
Generals			Officers					
Jefe Nacional	Jefe Directo de Milicias	Jefe Divisionario de Milicias	Jefe de Tercio	Subjefe de Tercio	Jefe de Bandera	Subjefe de Bandera	Jefe de Centuria	Subjefe de Centuria

=== Enlisted personnel ===
NCOs			Enlisted	
				No Insignia
Jefe de Falange	Subjefe de Falange	Jefe de Escuadra	Subjefe de Escuadra	Falangista
