= José Sáinz Nothnagel =

- Born: José Sáinz Nothnagel; 3 August 1907; Santa María de Meruelo
- Died: 26 June 1984 (aged 76); Dallas
- Other name: Pepe
- Occupation: Regional sales manager
- Employer: Mexicana Airlines
- Known for: Political activist
- Political party: Falange

José Sáinz Nothnagel (3 August 1907 – 26 June 1984) was a Spanish politician with the Falange and a leading figure in the early days of the Spanish Civil War.

Born in Santa María de Meruelo near Santander, Cantabria, Sáinz, whose mother was German, lived in New York City from 1912 to 1922, returned to Spain when his father was stricken by encephalitis, and then obtained an electric engineering degree in Germany with Siemens.1924-26 In 1932, while working as the director of the Office of Tourism in Toledo, he became one of the founding members of the Falange with José Antonio Primo de Rivera. He was appointed to the first National Council in October 1934 and the Junta Política in October 1935. In the run-up to the war he was a central figure in arranging co-operation between the Falange and the army and he suggested that a proposed coup should begin in Toledo where he was provincial chief. Sáinz was arrested for his conspiracies, most notably on 28 May 1936 when he and Sancho Dávila y Fernández de Celis were arrested at José Antonio Primo de Rivera's house. He was arrested again on June 5 when he was discovered Alcañiz prison, relaying the orders of General Emilio Mola that the coup was to be postponed.

Following the execution of José Antonio at the start of the war, Sáinz was suggested as a possible successor but instead became a member of the Second National Council and declared in favour of the nominated successor Manuel Hedilla. Indeed, at a meeting of the junta of command held on 14 April 1937 only Sáinz and Francisco Bravo voted for Hedilla as leader. His participation in the "tragic comedy of errors" is well documented when he sent a telegram to field commanders stating "only obey orders through hierarchal command", which was widely interpreted. During much of the first year he was the highest-ranking and only remaining original member of The Falange.

In June 1937 he was briefly detained by Franco's forces as a supporter of Hedilla who, by that time, had been jailed for refusing to co-operate with the new movement. To avoid the politics Sainz became a battlefield organizer. He suffered battle wounds for the fourth time on 4 September 1936, in Talavera de la Reina. resulting in the amputation of a finger. Sáinz participated in numerous campaigns in Nationalist territory organizing troops and was instrumental in the recapture of Toledo and the Alcazar de Toledo from Republican forces 27 September 1936, after a 63-day siege.

In December 1936 Sainz led a delegation sent to Berlin to study the organization of Germany. During much of the remainder of the war he organized men and materials, oversaw construction of facilities, and arranged relief for recaptured territories. This also allowed him the opportunity to visit his mother and grandmother.

After the end of the war Sáinz started a branch of the called Educacion y Descanso, (Work, Education, and Rest), under auspices of the Ministry of the Interior, led by Ramón Serrano Suñer, overseeing the construction of facilities and policy. This effort culminated in The First National Championship of Producers, a nationwide sporting event on 14 July 1940.

In 1944 Sainz left government service to pursue private ventures including the rowboat concession at Retiro Park in Madrid, a poultry farm, and construction efforts in Madrid.

In 1948 a cache of 30 buried pistols captured during the war was discovered on his Cantabrian farm, one of which was used in a robbery, and a warrant was issued by the government for sedition. This was one of several times. he was arrested by the post war Franco government.

In 1948 he left Spain for Mexico to become the general manager of Aerovías Guest until it was absorbed by competitor Aeromex. His wife refused to follow him to Mexico. In 1956 he remarried and had three more children. He also was a partner in a travel agency and was briefly employed by Japan Airlines in the early 1960s in Mexico City. In 1963 he moved his family to Los Angeles, California and was employed by Mexicana de Aviación in sales. In 1969 he became the regional manager in Miami, Florida, in 1973 regional manager in Dallas, Texas, and in 1978 regional manager in San Juan, Puerto Rico. In 1981 he had open heart surgery, and retired back to Dallas, Texas, in 1982 and died in Dallas 26 June 1984.

== Gallery ==
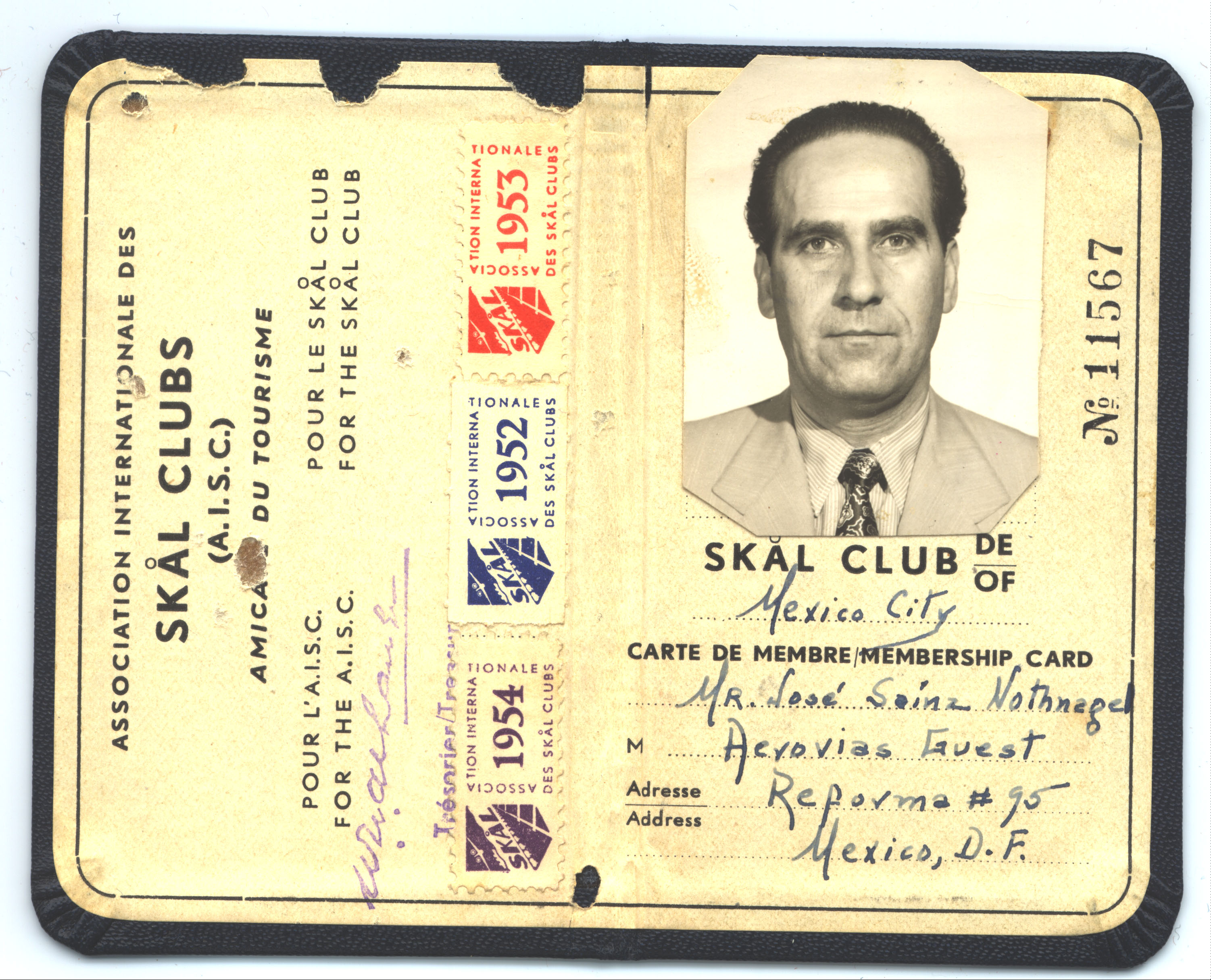
Membership card for Skål Club of Mexico City, 1952

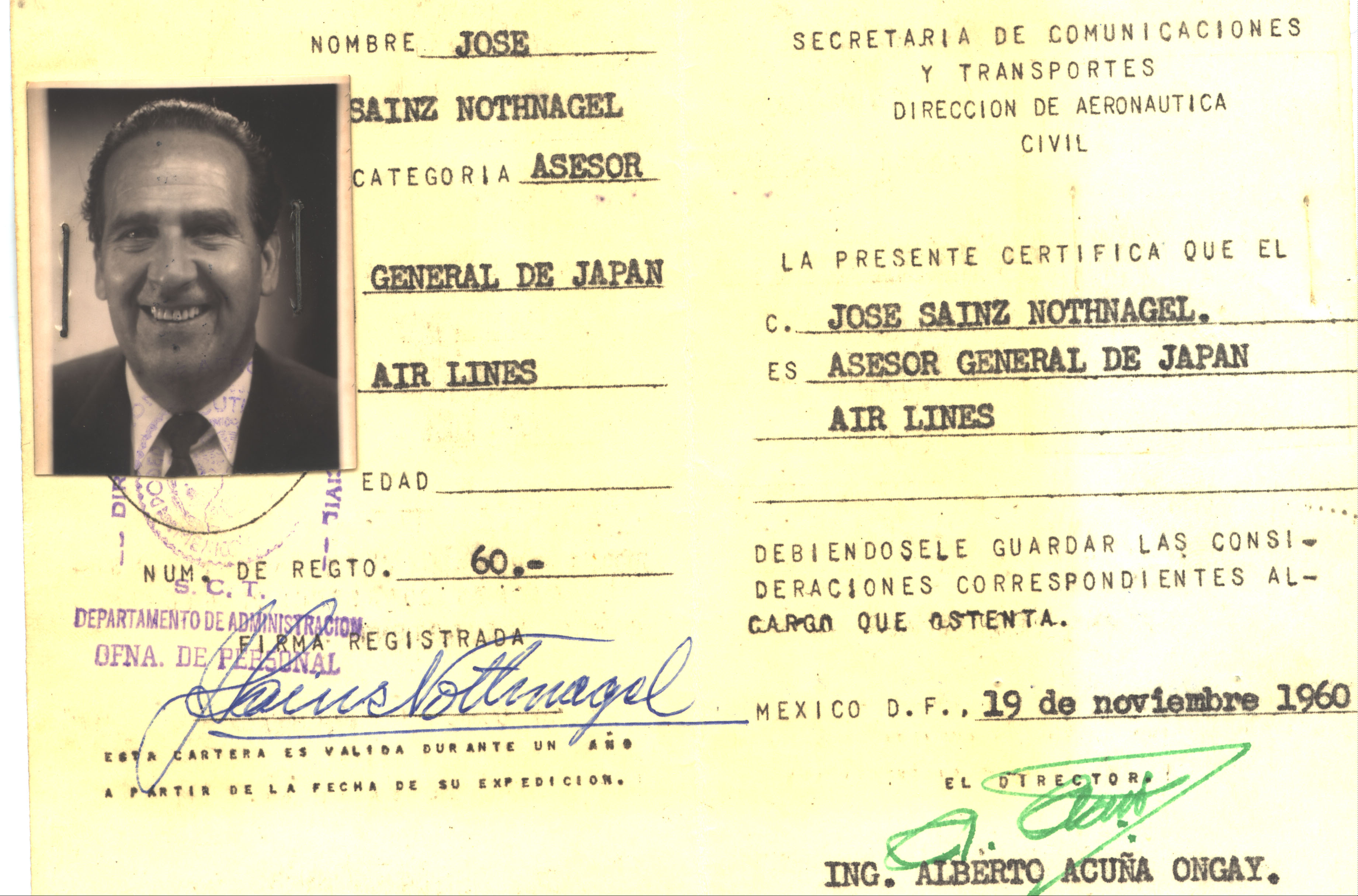
Japan Air Lines card, 1960
