= Sancho Dávila y Fernández de Celis =

Spanish politician (1905–1972)

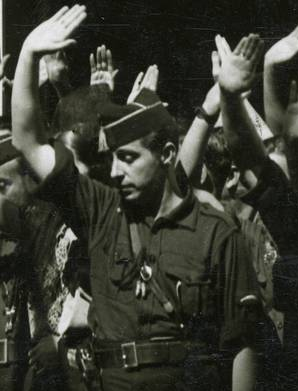
- Dávila performing the Roman salute in Seville, 1936.

President of the Royal Spanish Football Federation
- In office 1952–1954

Personal details
- Born: 5 June 1905 Cádiz, Spain
- Died: 14 November 1972 (aged 67) Madrid, Spain
- Party: FET y de las JONS
- Other political affiliations: FE de las JONS
- Relatives: José Antonio Primo de Rivera (cousin)
- Occupation: Politician
- Awards: Order of Cisneros

Sancho Dávila y Fernández de Celis (1905–1972) was a Spanish Falangist politician. He was an important figure in the early history of the movement but later fell out of favour.

== Falangism ==
Dávila was a cousin of José Antonio Primo de Rivera and as such was given the responsibility of expanding the operations of the Falange in Seville and Cádiz in 1933. He soon rose to the rank of jefe territorial for Andalusia. He was a close ally of José Sáinz Nothnagel and was arrested with him in May 1936 at José Antonio's house.

== Power struggle ==
Following the execution of José Antonio Primo de Rivera, Dávila joined with his ally Agustín Aznar in a power struggle for the leadership of the Falange. The two men led the legitimistas group within the movement which opposed the leadership of Primo de Rivera's nominated successor Manuel Hedilla. Dávila's presence was especially important to this group due to his familial connection and he was central in maintaining the cult of El Ausente (the absent), as Primo de Rivera was to be known. In the struggle that followed the legitimista militia seized power for themselves and on April 16, 1937 set up a triumvirate made up of Dávila, Aznar and José Moreno at the head of the Falange. However, with the help of Nazi German agent Carl von Haartman, Hedilla's forces recaptured the Falange HQ from Dávila and before long Francisco Franco stepped in, ostensibly to support Hedilla but in fact to create the Falange Española Tradicionalista y de las Juntas de Ofensiva Nacional-Sindicalista and thus effectively eliminate the Falange and its leaders as threats to his position. Dávila was imprisoned following the incident although his close friend Gonzalo Queipo de Llano intervened to secure his release.

== Later years ==
In a snub from Franco, he was not named as a National Delegate until 1938 at a time when a number of pro-Nazis were added to this office. He was replaced as delegate to the Frente de Juventudes in 1941 by José Antonio Elola-Olaso as the influence of Dávila's ally Ramón Serrano Súñer began to wane.

Between 1952 and 1954 he served as the President of the Royal Spanish Football Federation.
