= En la Plaza de mi Pueblo =

En la Plaza de mi Pueblo ("In the square of my village") is a Spanish-language song originating during the Spanish Civil War of 1936–1939, and is usually attributed to the anarchist CNT-FAI, a prominent labour organization at the time which sent its own militias to fight alongside the Spanish Republican Army during the Civil War. The melody is that of a Spanish folk song, "El Café de Chinitas," which in turn is attributed to (or, in some accounts, simply written down by) Federico García Lorca.

== Lyrics ==
Spanish	English translation
En la plaza de mi pueblo dijo el jornalero al amo: "¡Nuestros hijos nacerán con el puño levantado!" Y esta tierra, que no es mía, esta tierra, que es del amo, la riego con mi sudor la trabajo con mis manos. Pero dime, compañero, si estas tierras son del amo, ¿Por qué nunca le hemos visto trabajando en el arado? Con mi arado abro los surcos con mi arado escribo yo páginas sobre la tierra de miseria y de sudor.	In the square of my village the laborer said to the master: "Our children will be born with their fists raised!" And this land, which isn't mine, this land which is the master's I water it with my sweat and work it with my hands. But tell me, comrade¹, if these lands belong to the master, Why do we never see him working with the plow? With my plow I open the furrows, with my plow I write pages onto the earth that tell of misery and of sweat.

- ¹ "Compañero" in Spanish can mean either "comrade," in a political context, or something akin to "buddy" if informal. Since this song is very clearly political, it has been translated as "comrade."

== See also ==
- Songs of the Spanish Civil War
