= Cara al Sol =

Anthem of Falange Española de las JONS

English: Facing the Sun
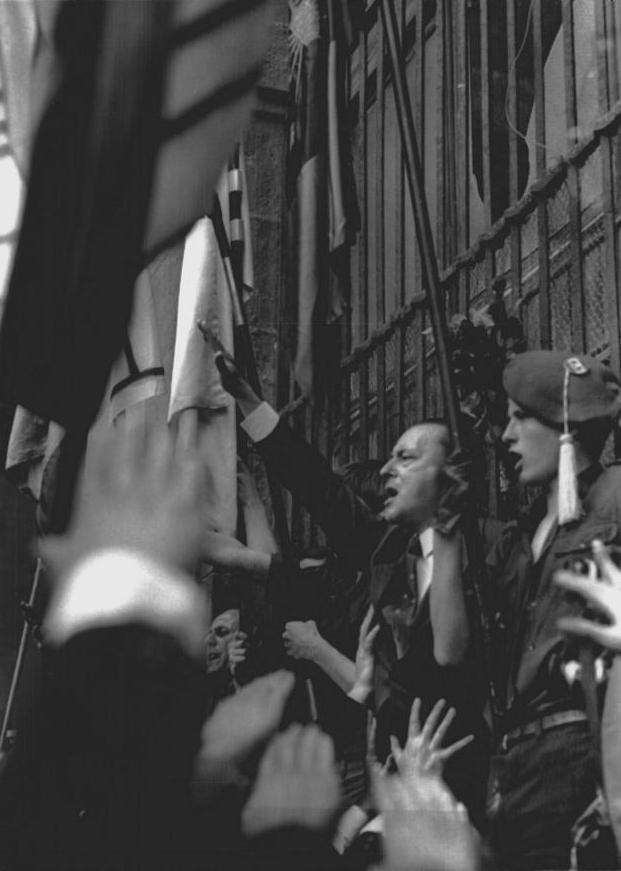
- Blas Piñar and Carlos García Juliá (in Falange uniform) sing Cara al sol in 1976 among a crowd making Roman salutes.
- Former unofficial anthem of Spain and anthem of Falange
- Lyrics: José Antonio Primo de Rivera, 1936
- Music: Juan Tellería; Juan R. Buendia, 1935
- Adopted: 1936

Audio sample
- Cara al Sol: file; help

Cara al Sol (English: Facing the Sun) is the anthem of the Falange Española de las JONS. The lyrics were written in December 1935 and are usually credited to the leader of the Falange, José Antonio Primo de Rivera. The music was composed by Juan Tellería and Juan R. Buendia.

The circumstances of its creation are unusual. The Falangists needed a stirring song of their own to counter the popular appeal of El Himno de Riego (the official anthem of the Second Spanish Republic) and A las Barricadas (a very popular Anarchist song).

To solve the problem, Primo de Rivera formed a committee meeting on 2 December 1935 in the home of Marichu de la Mora Maura. Those present included José María Alfaro, Rafael Sánchez Mazas, Agustín de Foxá, Pedro Mourlane Michelena, Dionisio Ridruejo, Agustín Aznar, and Luis Aguilar. The result of their efforts, following a period of sub-committee review (at the Cueva del Orkompon, a Basque bar in Calle Miguel Moya, Madrid) was provisionally entitled the Himno de Falange Española. It was first performed in a rally at the Cine Europa of Madrid on February 2, 1936.

The music was based on a 1935 piece by Juan Tellería, Amanecer en Cegama ("Dawn at Zegama") The song was registered with number 75 027 between 1936 and 1937 with the lyrics at the name of Juan Ruiz de la Fuente.

Its popularity was boosted by Primo de Rivera's execution on 20 November 1936 and his subsequent glorification by the Spanish Nationalists.

During the Spanish Civil War the Falange, much like other youth parties under totalitarian regimes, became an important part of the National Army (or National Movement) both ideologically and militarily. It remained as an independent organization but strengthened the regular insurgent army in the combat lines, suffering casualties as a result. Cara al sol was their anthem throughout the war, due in part to the lyrics' homage to "fallen comrades".

In Francoist Spain, the Falange was merged with other far-right groups to form the "Falange Española Tradicionalista y de las JONS", the only legal political party. Cara al Sol became a canto nacional ("national song") together with the Oriamendi, the hymn of the Carlist movement, and the anthem of the Spanish Legion, often played alongside the official anthem, the Marcha Granadera, and was regarded as the battle song of the Spanish far right. A decree from 1942 orders that, in official events, the national songs must be saluted with a Roman salute or, in exclusively military events, a military salute.

Since the Spanish transition to democracy, the song has frequently been played at far-right rallies.

== Writing of lyrics ==
The lyrics were a collaborative effort, under the editorship of Primo de Rivera. Authorship of individual lines are attributed as follows: 1–4 Foxá, Primo de Rivera, Alfaro; 5–10 Foxá; 11–12 Ridruejo; 13–14 Primo de Rivera; 15 Alfaro; 16 Mourlane; and 17–18 Alfaro. Lines 19–22 were existing Falange slogans.

== Imagery in the lyrics ==
- Line 1: The reference to the "new shirt" relates to the Falangist uniform, a working-class, plain blue shirt which was their most distinctive sign and was embroidered upon the heart position in the left side of the chest with the party symbol in red colour, a yoke uniting in its center an array of five arrows pointing upwards, meaning strength, sacrifice and union.
- Lines 13-14: The reference to the arrows is an allusion to the Falange "Yoke and Arrows" symbol and to the Falangist youth movement.
- Lines 19-21 España Una, Grande y Libre was a frequently used slogan in Francoism. The lyrics incorporated a version of a chant that was very common at Falangist/Francoist rallies.
- Line 22: Falangists use Arriba España ("Arise Spain" or "Onward Spain") instead of the more mainstream Viva España ("Long live Spain").

== Alternate lines ==
In Line 5, mis compañeros ("my companions") is sometimes replaced by los compañeros ("the companions") or otros compañeros ("other companions").

== "Amanecer" ballad version ==
This version of the song appeared after the civil war, and is a slow-motion version of "Cara al Sol", sometimes sung by a female voice, almost a ballad. This is a very different version, given the fact that "Cara al Sol" was originally a battle song, and "Amanecer" is almost a love ballad. It was produced and conducted by A. Velázquez.

== Further influences ==
- After the war, Falangists could be classed as "old shirts", early believers who joined the party before the war, and "new shirts", a reference to the anthem hinting at "bandwagon followers" who joined during the war or later.
- Si te dicen que caí is a 1973 novel by Juan Marsé (es:Si te dicen que caí) and its 1989 film version by Vicente Aranda.
- Banderas victoriosas is a 1939 documentary film by José Ernesto Díaz-Noriega.
- Las flechas de mi haz is a 1977 book by José Luis Martín Vigil.
