= Twenty-Six Point Program of the Falange =

Spanish Falangism manifesto

The Twenty-Six Point Program of the Falange (Spanish: Programa de Veintiséis Puntos de la Falange), originally the Twenty-Seven Point Program of the Falange (Spanish: Programa de Veintisiete Puntos de la Falange), is a manifesto that was written by José Antonio Primo de Rivera in September 1934. It served as a guiding document for the Falange Española political organization founded by Rivera in October 1933, as well as for its successor, the Falange Española de las Juntas de Ofensiva Nacional Sindicalista (FE de las JONS).

The manifesto is divided into six sections: "Nation, Unity, and Empire"; "State, Individual, Liberty"; "Economy, Labor, Class Struggle"; "Land"; "National Education and Religion"; and "National Revolution." Its content focuses on expanding the Spanish Empire, rejecting Marxism, rejecting Capitalism, nationalization of banking services, providing a right to work, expanding economic unity, agricultural reclamation of the countryside, and maintaining Catholicism.

During the 1937 merger of FE de las JONS with the Traditionalist Communion movement, Francisco Franco purged the original document's twenty-sixth point mandating that the Falange maintain dominance in any partnership. The new organization, abbreviated as FET y de las JONS, maintained the Twenty-Six Point Program of the Falange until its 1958 rebranding as the Movimiento Nacional with a guiding "Doctrine of the Movement" written the same year.
