= Cantos nacionales =

Three Nationalist songs of the Spanish Civil War

Cantos nacionales ("national songs" or "Nationalist songs") were three songs of the Spanish Civil War recognized by Francoist Spain as honoring their fallen. The Decree 226/1937 of the Burgos Junta declared the Marcha Granadera as the Spanish anthem.

It also recognizes as cantos nacionales the anthems of Falange Española (Cara al Sol), Carlism (Oriamendi) and the Spanish Legion (Novio de la muerte) ordering that they should be listened to standing in homage to the Fatherland and the fallen.

A decree from 1942 reinstates the songs and orders that, in official events, the playing of the anthem and the songs must be saluted with a "national salute" (Roman salute), or a military salute if the event is exclusively military.
