= Falange Española de las JONS =

Former political party in Spain

Spanish Falange of the Councils of the National Syndicalist Offensive Falange Española de las Juntas de Ofensiva Nacional Sindicalista
- Founders: José Antonio Primo de Rivera; Ramiro Ledesma; Onésimo Redondo
- Founded: 4 March 1934; 92 years ago
- Dissolved: 19 April 1937; 89 years ago
- Preceded by: Falange Española; JONS
- Merged into: FET y de las JONS
- Newspaper: Arriba
- Student wing: Sindicato Español Universitario
- Women's wing: Sección Femenina
- Armed wing: Falange de la Sangre
- Membership: approx. 40,000 (1934 est.)
- Ideology: Falangism; National syndicalism; Fascism
- Political position: Self-proclaimed: Syncretic; De facto: Far-right
- Colours: Red Black Blue
- Anthem: "Cara al Sol" (transl. 'Facing the Sun')

Party flag

The Falange Española de las Juntas de Ofensiva Nacional Sindicalista (transl. Spanish Phalanx of the Councils of the National Syndicalist Offensive; FE de las JONS) was a national syndicalist political party founded in Spain in 1934 as merger of the Falange Española and the Juntas de Ofensiva Nacional-Sindicalista. FE de las JONS, which became the main national syndicalist group during the Second Spanish Republic, ceased to exist as such when, during the Civil War, General Francisco Franco merged it with the Traditionalist Communion in April 1937 to form the similarly named Falange Española Tradicionalista y de las JONS (FET y de las JONS).

== History ==
=== Early history ===
In 1934, Falange Española (FE) merged with the Juntas de Ofensiva Nacional-Sindicalista (JONS) of Onésimo Redondo and Ramiro Ledesma, becoming the 'Falange Española de las Juntas de Ofensiva Nacional Sindicalista'. During and after the 1933 election campaign, members of both the Falange and JONS had been killed; on 9 February 1934, Matías Montero was murdered while selling Falangist newspapers, becoming a martyr for the small movement. By June 1934, ten of them were dead, killed primarily by the Socialists but also with an anarchist contribution; the Socialists had no intention of allowing a fascist movement to develop in Spain, fearing such a movement would crush them as had happened in Germany and Italy. The Falangists initially fought back ineffectively (resulting in their being ridiculed by the rest of the political right) but eventually they formed their own death squads.

After the tenth member, Juan Cuéllar, was killed and had his corpse abused in Madrid on 10 June 1934 during a confrontation with socialists, the Falangists attacked a group of Socialist Youth, killing a young woman, Juanita Rico, who was alleged to have abused the corpse, and seriously wounding two other socialists. Rico received a large funeral and was hailed as "the first victim of fascism in Spain." Rico's killers seemed to have acted on their own initiative without informing their superiors and an escalation of violence soon followed; José Antonio had to put his foot down to prevent some Falangists from assassinating Indalecio Prieto and from blowing up the Socialists' headquarters in Madrid.

The party was initially organised as a triumvirate formed by Ramiro Ledesma, Ruiz de Alda and José Antonio Primo de Rivera, while the secondary General Secretary position was given to Raimundo Fernández-Cuesta. It attracted a considerable number of prominent intellectuals, including Pedro Mourlane Michelena, Rafael Sánchez Mazas, Ernesto Giménez Caballero, Eugenio Montes, José María Alfaro, Agustín de Foxa, Luys Santa Marina, Samuel Ros, Jacinto Miquelarena and Dionisio Ridruejo.

Martin Blinkhorn has recognised at least four different ideological strands within the Falange, a somewhat ecumenical party, from the fusion until the expulsion of Ledesma: conservatism espoused by monarchists such as Francisco Moreno Herrera, marquis of Eliseda; the authoritarian Catholicism of Onésimo Redondo; the radical (and anti-clerical) national syndicalism of Ramiro Ledesma; and the distinctive elitist regenerationism of José Antonio Primo de Rivera. In October 1934, the direction unified under a Jefe Nacional (National Chief) in the person of José Antonio and developed the political program known as "the 27 Points". In November 1934, the marquis of Eliseda, a financial backer of the party, left the Falange over disagreements with party proposals in regards to state-church relations, which he deemed "frankly heretical". His departure left the party without its main income and propaganda apparatus.

Inner tensions over the draft of the political program continued. The power struggle between Ramiro Ledesma, who espoused a radical and anti-capitalist vision; and José Antonio Primo de Rivera, who held a more conservative and aristocratic one, eventually led to the expulsion of Ledesma in January 1935. The party also had difficulties in achieving in economic solvency. Although, in principle, it received support from large financiers and landowners, this was not enough until in 1935, it was subsidized monthly with 50,000 lire by the Italian Fascist regime. The subsidy was reduced by half and withdrawn after the poor electoral results of 1936.

The party was republican, modernist, championed the lower classes and opposed both oligarchy and communism, but it never garnered the kind of popular following demonstrated by fascist movements elsewhere in Europe. For these reasons, the Falange was shunned by other right-leaning parties in the Spanish general election of 1936. Its candidates ran in 19 electoral districts (out of 60). There were some 83,000 people voting for Falangist candidates, but given 1 voter was entitled to a number of votes, the party obtained 0.11% of all votes cast. The only district where FE exceeded 1% of votes was Valladolid (1.63%); in three other districts (Caceres, Cadiz and La Coruna) it gained more than 0.5% of votes. Primo de Rivera (who was running in 13 districts) obtained a total of 24,017 votes; Manuel López Sendón received 18,704 votes and Raimundo Fernández-Cuesta got 10,438 votes.

Having likely never exceeded ten thousand members in the early 1930s, the Falange lost supporters in the run-up to the Spanish Civil War, leaving a core of young, dedicated activists, many in the organization's student organization, the Sindicato Español Universitario. The Falangist program was heavily influenced by Catholicism but the party desired a separation between church and state; the Falange had no intention of forcing Catholicism upon millions of Spanish non-believers. The Falangist were in some ways anti-conservative, as while most of the Spanish conservative right refused any reform and defended private property at all levels, the Falange favoured some nationalisations (such as banking and public services), as well as economic and social reform; the Falange defended "legitimate" productive capitalism while denouncing what they regarded usurious, financial and speculative capitalism. This view was compatible with private property but not with the abuses perpetrate against the lower classes, whom the Falange believed should be saved from the misery in which they lived (referring specifically to landless peasants and day labourers). The party thus did not desire a left-wing revolution but poverty alleviation and to end class struggle by using a new, vertical, syndicalist structure under the Falange. The party desired to attract people from all social classes, whether or not they had been members of left-wing organisations; the Falange viewed conflict between political parties as a consequence of liberalism and democracy. They hoped this unification would make Spain powerful again and allow Spain to launch further imperial acquisitions. However, historian Stanley Payne argues that the Falange had no desire to actually conquer territory (with de Rivera viewing the age of conquest as at an end) but instead their idea of an empire actually meant increasing Spanish cultural power, particularly in Latin America where Spain could act as a kind of Hispanic cultural leader. There was also the prospect of forming a type of federation with Portugal.

The party had a militia, the Primera Línea ("first line"), and it had a detailed training manual, probably prepared by the retired Lieutenant Colonel Luis Arrendondo, which carried instructions for guerilla warfare. While the Falange was not prepared for such a serious activity at the time, the document was well-publicised and convinced the Spanish Left that fascism was a serious threat in Spain. The Falange also had its own intelligence service, the Servicio de Información del Movimiento ("Information service of the movement").

The group had access to a variety of weapons, firearms and explosives. A few months before the war began, several artillery officers began providing military training to Falangist militants.

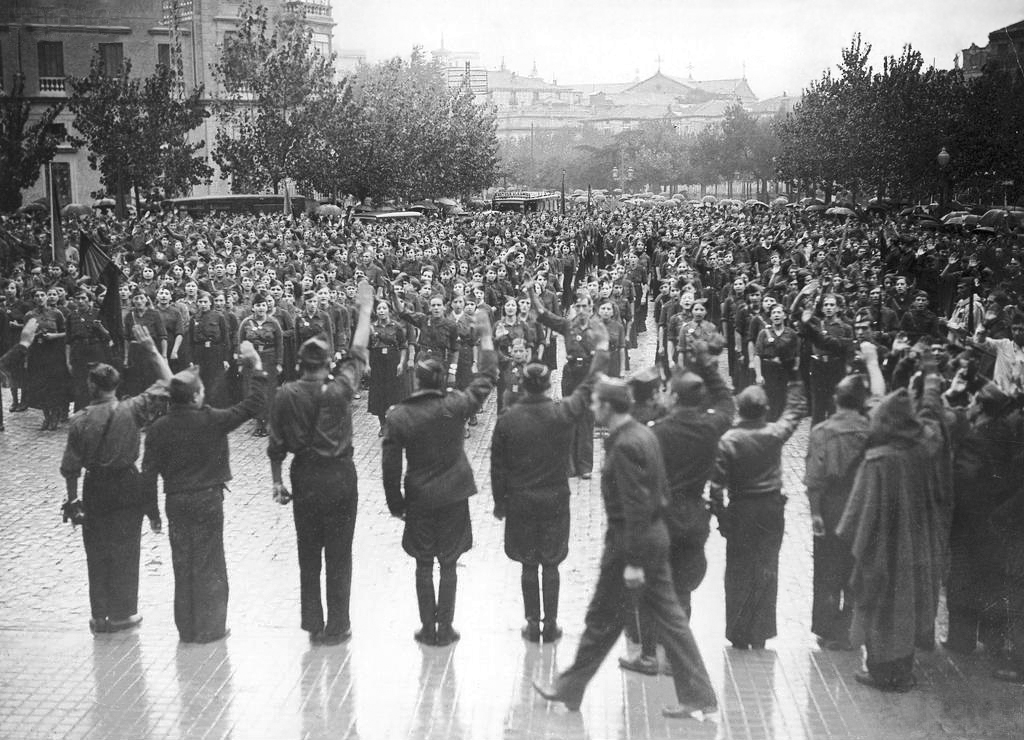
Militias of the Falange in Zaragoza, October 1936

The Falange's male membership was accompanied by a female auxiliary, the Sección Femenina ("female section"). Led by the José Antonio's sister Pilar, this latter subsidiary organization claimed more than a half million members by the end of the civil war and provided nursing and support services for the Nationalist forces. During the spring of 1936, when police persecution of the Falange (including the Women's Section) was at its height, the organisation was described by Rivera as the only Falangist section that was still largely intact and it proved crucial in the reorganisation of the Falange into a true underground movement. The Women's Section raised money for Falangist prisoners and their families and distributed clandestine propaganda, as well as carrying messages from imprisoned leaders to outside militants.

Following the 1936 elections, more violence erupted between the Falange and its enemies. While Rivera initially thought that the new government might implement the "national revolution" and ordered his militants to abstain from hostile acts against the government, it was not to last. On 6 March, four members of the Falangist trade union, CONS, who failed to support a leftist strike were killed. On 11 March, two law students, one Falangist and the other Carlist, were shot to death, allegedly by the Socialist Youth of Spain. Since there had been six Falange-affiliated deaths in five days, the Falange retaliated and on 13 March, several fascist gunman attempted to kill Luis Jiménez de Asúa, a well-known Socialist leader and law professor who was also one of the authors of the Republican Constitution. While he survived, a member of his police escort was fatally wounded. On 16 April, Falangists opened fire with submachineguns against workers in the centre of Madrid, killing three and wounding forty.

During the Popular Front government, sixty-seven Falangists were killed, compared to forty-one during the previous two years. In turn, the Falange killed sixty-four leftists, mostly socialists and communists. To survive against increased government persecution, the movement adopted a communist-style cell structure of three members per cell. One of the reasons the organisation survived was due to a large influx of new members, with 15,000 members of the CEDA youth organisation, JAP, joining the Falange (though this was a small number compared to JAP's total membership of 225,000).

The left-wing Popular Front government persecuted the Falange and imprisoned the Marqués de Estella on 6 July 1936. In turn, the Falange joined the conspiracy to overthrow the Second Spanish Republic, supporting the military revolt ultimately led by Francisco Franco and continuing to do so throughout the ensuing Spanish Civil War.

=== Spanish Civil War ===
With the eruption of the Civil War in July 1936, the Falange fought on the side of the Nationalist faction against the Second Spanish Republic, expanding rapidly from several thousand to several hundred thousand. Many people joined the Falange out of fear of persecution – former leftists and centrists rushed to join and tried to avert suspicion of their loyalties by being more fascist than the actual fascists. The massive influx of opportunists swamped the "old shirts" – nearly half of the pre-war veterans had died during the initial stages of the rebellion and several of its key leaders were either dead or captured, thus the swollen membership proved extremely awkward for the organisation.

Other Nationalist later mocked the influx of former leftists in "Failange" (a portmanteau with FAI, the Iberian Anarchist Federation).

The Falange, through its leader and co-founder, José Antonio Primo de Rivera, collaborated in the different conspiracies and military attempts to overthrow the Republic. In the last months, with the conspiracy that would lead to the uprising that was already underway, and with the Falange virtually excluded, Primo de Rivera was actively trying to get it to play a more decisive role. In contact with the conspirators from the prison of Alicante, where he was imprisoned, he alternated communiqués begging for a prompt uprising, with conditions to join the conspiracy that the military did not meet. Finally, an announcement on 17 July called on his organizations to join the coup, accepting an auxiliary role. The command of the party rested upon Manuel Hedilla, a former mechanic, as many of the first generation leaders were dead or incarcerated by the Republicans. Among them was Primo de Rivera, who was a government prisoner. As a result, he was referred to among the leadership as el Ausente, ("the Absent One"). After being sentenced to death on 18 November 1936, José Antonio Primo de Rivera was executed on 20 November 1936 (a date since known as 20-N in Spain) in a Republican prison, giving him martyr status among the Falangists. This conviction and sentence was possible because he had lost his parliamentary immunity after his party did not have enough votes during the last elections.

Hedilla played an important role in seizing the town of Corunna, bringing in well-armed Falangists to help rebels secure the town and partaking in some of the worst repression of the war there. Yet he later became one of the most outspoken critics of nationalist killings, arguing it alienated the workers from their cause – on Christmas Eve 1936 he told the Falange not to persecute workers who had "voted for the left out of hunger or despair. We all know that in many towns there were – and are – right-wingers who are worse than the reds." These statements, however, made Hedilla and other left-wing Falangists highly suspect in the eyes of the Spanish right. Tension arose between the left and right wings of the Falange and the German ambassador encouraged Hedilla to resist the middle-class take over of the organisation. On the night of 16 April 1937, Hedilla's followers (though not Hedilla himself) attempted to seize the Falangist's headquarters in Salamanca from the rightists led by Sancho Dávila, resulting in a gun battle around the Plaza Mayor that left two Falangists dead and order had to be restored by the Civil Guard. On 18 April, Hedilla arranged a meeting at the Falange council in which he was elected leader.

After Francisco Franco seized power on 19 April 1937, he united under his command the Falange with the Carlist Comunión Tradicionalista with the Unification Decree, forming the Falange Española Tradicionalista y de las JONS (FET y de las JONS), whose official ideology was the Falangists' 27 puntos—reduced after the unification to 26. While the Carlists came off worse in this forced union, Franco had correctly deduced that they would be more obedient and less politically minded, making it less of a concern. Despite this, the party was in fact a wide-ranging nationalist coalition, closely controlled by Franco. Parts of the original Falange (including Hedilla) and many Carlists did not join the unified party. Franco had sought to control the Falange after a clash between Hedilla and his main critics within the group, the legitimistas of Agustín Aznar and Sancho Dávila y Fernández de Celis, that threatened to derail the Nationalist war effort. The new uniform consisted of the Carlist red beret and the Falangist blue shirt.

While the Falange was increasingly integrated into the Nationalist military, it did manage to maintain its own identity; their uniforms and correspondence maintained their own Falangist insignia, while the traditional term ¡presente! was used to refer to fallen comrades in reports and logs. None of the vanquished parties in the war suffered such a toll of deaths among their leaders as did the Falange. 60% of the pre-war Falangist membership lost their lives in the war. However, most of the property of all other parties and trade unions were assigned to the party. In 1938, all trade unions were unified under Falangist command.

== Ideology ==
=== National syndicalism and the Twenty-Seven Points ===
The ideology of the FE de las JONS was codified in the "Twenty-Seven Points", published in late 1934 and drafted principally by Ledesma with stylistic revisions by Primo de Rivera. The programme was organised into six sections covering nation and empire, the state, the economy, land, education and religion, and national revolution.

At its core, the programme advocated national syndicalism: the rejection of both Marxist class struggle and liberal individualism in favour of an organic, hierarchical state structured around vertical syndicates uniting workers and employers by industry in service of the nation. It called for sweeping agrarian reform to redistribute land to peasants, the nationalisation of credit facilities to prevent what it characterised as capitalist usury, and the criminalisation of both strikes and lockouts as illegal acts. Private property was not to be abolished but "legitimate" productive capitalism was distinguished from "usurious, financial and speculative capitalism," which the party condemned.

Primo de Rivera was explicit that this programme was neither left nor right. The party championed the lower classes but opposed both oligarchy and communism, and sought to attract members from all social strata. It did not desire a left-wing revolution but rather poverty alleviation and the end of class conflict through the new syndicalist structure. At the same time, the programme was explicitly ultranationalist and totalitarian: it called for the abolition of political parties, the establishment of a nationalist dictatorship, and the use of political violence as a means of national regeneration.

=== Internal ideological tensions ===
Despite the unifying programme, the party was never ideologically homogeneous. Martin Blinkhorn identified four distinct strands that coexisted uneasily within the party before Ledesma's expulsion: the monarchist conservatism of the Eliseda faction, the authoritarian Catholicism of Redondo, the radical anti-capitalist national syndicalism of Ledesma, and the elitist regenerationism of Primo de Rivera himself. The expulsion of Ledesma in January 1935 and the resignation of the Marquis of Eliseda in November 1934 progressively narrowed the party's internal range, leaving Primo de Rivera's more aristocratic and culturally oriented vision as the dominant tendency.

The party's relationship with Catholicism was ambiguous and a source of internal friction. The Falangist programme recognised Catholicism as integral to Spanish national identity but rejected direct clerical influence in government, insisting on the supremacy of the state over the Church. The Falange had no intention of forcing Catholicism on non-believers, and Primo de Rivera consistently maintained the separation of church and state. This position distinguished FE de las JONS sharply from the Carlist movement it was later merged with, and created lasting tension within the unified FET y de las JONS.

=== Hispanism and empire ===
The programme also contained a strong pan-Hispanist dimension. Points four and five called for Spain to once more seek its glory on the sea lanes and asserted that Spain would "continue to act as the spiritual axis of the Hispanic world." In a 1935 speech, Primo de Rivera was explicit that the party's concept of "empire" did not mean territorial conquest, which he regarded as a thing of the past; rather, it meant increasing Spanish cultural power and acting as a kind of Hispanic cultural leader, particularly in Latin America, with the prospect of a federation with Portugal also considered.

=== Scholarly classification ===
The scholarly consensus classifies FE de las JONS as a fascist movement. Stanley Payne argued that the party exhibited the "characteristic features of generic fascism" while also displaying unique attributes including "a nostalgic view of Spain's history, anti-separatism, imperialism, and Catholicism," combined with its national syndicalist economic agenda. Historian Ismael Saz described Primo de Rivera's doctrine as "a full fascism, based on a mythical conception of a regenerative, populist and ultranationalist revolution, oriented to the construction of a totalitarian State." The party received financial support from Mussolini's Italy, which regarded it as a vehicle for extending Italian influence in the Iberian Peninsula.

Some historians have highlighted the party's self-proclaimed syncretic character and the distinctively Spanish context of its nationalism as features that set it apart from Italian Fascism or German National Socialism. Roger Griffin has noted the party's "self-proclaimed" syncretic positioning, though its de facto political orientation was firmly far-right.

== Organisation ==
=== Leadership and structure ===
The party was initially led by a triumvirate of Julio Ruiz de Alda, Ramiro Ledesma, and José Antonio Primo de Rivera. After October 1934, direction was unified under Primo de Rivera as Jefe Nacional. The party's armed wing, the Falange de la Sangre (Blood Falange), also known as the Primera Línea ("First Line"), had a detailed training manual for guerrilla warfare and served as the movement's paramilitary force. The party also maintained its own intelligence service, the Servicio de Información del Movimiento.

The Sección Femenina (Female Section), led by Pilar Primo de Rivera, the younger sister of José Antonio, served as the party's women's auxiliary. During the spring of 1936, when police persecution was at its height, the Sección Femenina was described by Primo de Rivera as the only part of the organisation still largely intact. It raised money for Falangist prisoners and their families, distributed clandestine propaganda, and carried messages between imprisoned leaders and outside militants. The Sindicato Español Universitario (SEU) was the party's student union, which held significant influence in university politics and served as a key recruitment ground.

=== Symbolism ===
The party adopted the yoke and arrows (yugo y flechas) emblem, evoking Spain's historical unity under the Catholic Monarchs. Its colours were red, black, and blue; its anthem was Cara al Sol. These symbols were retained wholesale by the FET y de las JONS following the 1937 merger.

== Absorption into the FET y de las JONS ==
On 19 April 1937, the Unification Decree issued by General Franco forcibly merged FE de las JONS with the Carlist movement to form the Falange Española Tradicionalista y de las JONS, the sole legal party of the Francoist regime. The new party formally adopted 26 of the original 27 Points, dropping only the clause prohibiting mergers. While the Carlists came off worse in the forced union, Franco had correctly assessed that they would be more obedient than the Falangists. Much of the leadership of the original Falange was either dead, imprisoned, or hostile to the unification. The new uniform combined the Carlist red beret with the Falangist blue shirt. Falangist insignia, the ¡presente! salute for fallen comrades, and the party's anthem were preserved within the new organisation.

== Bibliography ==
- Beevor, Antony (2006). The Battle for Spain: The Spanish Civil War 1936–39. London: Weidenfeld & Nicolson.
- Blinkhorn, Martin (1975). Carlism and Crisis in Spain 1931–1939. Cambridge University Press. ISBN 0-521-20729-0.
- Diego González, Álvaro de (1998). "La poesía que promete, la poesía que destruye: la Falange de José Antonio". Aportes. Revista de historia contemporánea. 13 (37). San Sebastián de los Reyes: Editorial Actas: 41–56. ISSN 0213-5868.
- González Calleja, Eduardo (2012). "La prensa carlista y falangista durante la Segunda República y la Guerra Civil (1931–1937)". El Argonauta español (9). doi:10.4000/argonauta.819. ISSN 1765-2901.
- Payne, Stanley G. (1987). The Franco Regime, 1936–1975. Madison: The University of Wisconsin Press. ISBN 978-0-299-11074-1.
- Payne, Stanley G. (1995). A History of Fascism, 1914–1945. Univ of Wisconsin Press. ISBN 978-0-299-14874-4.
- Payne, Stanley G. (2011). The Franco Regime, 1936–1975. University of Wisconsin Press.
- Preston, Paul (2003). Doves of War. Boston: Northeastern University Press. ISBN 1-55553-560-7.
- Quirosa-Cheyrouse y Muñoz, Rafael (1998). Católicos, monárquicos y fascistas en Almería durante la Segunda República. Almería: Universidad de Almería; Instituto de Estudios Almerienses. ISBN 848240119X.
- Ruiz, Julius (2014). The 'Red Terror' and the Spanish Civil War. Cambridge University Press.
- Sanz Hoya, Julián (2008). La construcción de la dictadura franquista en Cantabria: Instituciones, personal político y apoyos sociales (1937–1951). Santander and Torrelavega: Universidad de Cantabria; Ayuntamiento de Torrelavega. ISBN 978-84-8102-486-9.
- Saz Campos, Ismael (2004). "Fascism, Fascistization and Developmentalism in Franco's Dictatorship". Social History. 29 (3): 346. doi:10.1080/0307102042000257629. ISSN 0307-1022. S2CID 144311121.
- Thomàs, Joan Maria (14 May 2019). "José Antonio Primo de Rivera y el Frente Popular". Historia y Política (in Spanish) (41): 155. doi:10.18042/hp.41.06. hdl:20.500.11797/imarina5874065. ISSN 1989-063X.
- Turnbull, Patrick; Burn, Jeffrey (1978). The Spanish Civil War, 1936-39 (PDF). London: Osprey Pub. ISBN 0-85045-282-1.
