= Pedro de Paz =

Spanish writer

Pedro de Paz (born 26 October 1969 in Madrid) is a Spanish writer.

After working in computing for more than 15 years, de Paz decided in 2002 to try a career in literature. His first novel, El hombre que mató a Durruti (2004), won the José Saramago Novel Competition. The novel was translated into English and published by ChristieBooks in its Read and Noir series. De Paz' literary output is mainly in the field of police and crime novels. He also writes articles and short stories, some of them published in various anthologies and magazines.

== Bibliography ==
=== In Spanish ===
- El documento Saldaña (Ed. Planeta, 2008; Círculo de Lectores, 2009), ISBN 978-84-08-07892-0 ; ISBN 978-84-672-3352-0
- "Mala Suerte", in: La lista negra (Ed. Salto de Página, 2009) ISBN 978-84-936354-3-5 Collective anthology of short stories.
- Muñecas tras el cristal (Ed. El Tercer Nombre, 2006), ISBN 84-934791-4-4
- "Revenge Blues", in: La vida es un bar (Ed. Amargord, 2006) ISBN 84-87302-27-0 Collective anthology of short stories.
- El hombre que mató a Durruti (Ed. Germanía, 2004), ISBN 84-96147-23-1
- La senda trazada (2010), ISBN 978-8498776751

=== In English ===
- The man who killed Durruti (Ed. ChristieBooks, 2005) ISBN 1-873976-26-7
