= 20-N =

Abbreviation for 20th of November, in Spanish history

20-N is a symbolic abbreviation used to denote the date of death of two far-right figures in 20th-century Spanish history. The first date, 20 November 1936, near the end of the first year of the Spanish Civil War, marks the execution in Alicante of 33-year-old José Antonio Primo de Rivera, the founder of the fascist party, Falange Española (Spanish Phalanx), who became extolled as a cult figure during the years of post-civil war Francoist Spain led by Francisco Franco.

The second date, 39 years later, is 20 November 1975, when Generalísimo Franco – aged 82, and having ruled Spain for close to four decades as its dictator, or as he called himself, caudillo (Spanish for leader) – died in bed following a lengthy illness. The date continues to be commemorated by far-right groups which mark it by organizing public demonstrations.

== History of the event ==
On 20 November 1936, during the early stages of the Spanish Civil War, Jose-Antonio Primo de Rivera was executed by firing squad in Alicante prison. Primo de Rivera was the leader and founder of the far right Falange Española and had supported the coup d'etat led by General Franco against the elected government. His execution was on charges of conspiracy against the Republic, and was based on his actions prior to the uprising, as he had been in prison at its outbreak due to illegal possession of arms. During the Franco regime (1939-1975), 20 November was named Día del Dolor and solemn commemorations of Primo de Rivera's life and work were held in churches and schools throughout Spain.

Upon Franco's death on 20 November 1975, the day became a memorial for various far right groupings and remnants of the Franco regime. The first anniversary of Franco's death was commemorated officially in a ceremony at the Valley of the Fallen, broadcast live on national television. Around this time, graffiti appeared in Barcelona reading 20-N, which was interpreted by observers as relating to Franco's death, and the abbreviation quickly spread throughout the far right. The use of the abbreviation to refer to far right commemorations on this day was later adopted by the public in general.

Groups which have celebrated the 20-N include Fundación Nacional Francisco Franco and Falange Española de las JONS, who both make annual pilgrimages to the Valley of the Fallen, where Franco and Primo de Rivera are interred. In addition to these commemorations, the 20-N is observed by Falange Auténtica, Falange Española Independiente, Círculos José Antonio, Fuerza Nueva and other far right and neofascist groups.

== Other incidents ==
- The same day also proved to be fatal to Primo de Rivera's political opposite, 40-year-old Buenaventura Durruti, a key leader of Spain's two largest anarchist organizations, Federación Anarquista Ibérica (Iberian Anarchist Federation) and the anarcho-syndicalist trade union Confederación Nacional del Trabajo (National Confederation of Labor). Durruti's death occurred, according to his chauffeur, in the midst of distant gunfire in the trenches of Madrid.
- The Spanish general election on November 20, 2011 coincided with the 75th anniversary of Primo de Rivera's execution and the 36th anniversary of Franco's death.
- November 20 is also the anniversary of the assassination of Basque nationalist politicians Santiago Brouard, murdered in 1984, and Josu Muguruza, assassinated in 1989. Brouard's murderer, Rafael López Ocaña, claims the date was chosen at random.

== In popular fiction ==
- And in the Third Year, He Rose Again is a 1980 satirical film based in a novel by Fernando Vizcaíno Casas. On 20 November 1978, Franco rises from the dead.

== Bibliography ==
- Payne, Stanley G. (1961) Falange. A History of Spanish Fascism. Stanford University Press.
- Thomas, Hugh. "The Hero in the Empty Room: Jose Antonio and Spanish Fascism," Journal of Contemporary History (1966) 1#1 pp. 174–182 in JSTOR.
- Velarde Fuertes, Juan. "José Antonio y la economía" Grafite ediciones. ISBN 84-96281-10-8.
- Hugh Thomas The Spanish Civil War. Middlesex, England: Penguin Books Ltd., 1965.
- Emma Goldman Durruti is Dead, Yet Living (1936).
- Antony Beevor The Spanish Civil War (1982).
- Abel Paz Durruti in the Spanish Revolution, Translated by Chuck W. Morse, AK Press, 2007. ISBN 1-904859-50-X.
- Pedro de Paz The Man Who Killed Durruti Read and Noir (2005).
- Hans Magnus Enzensberger The Short Summer of Anarchy: Life and Death of Buenaventura Durruti (1972) (originally: Der kurze Sommer der Anarchie: Buenaventura Durrutis Leben und Tod).
- Collective work Buenaventura Durruti, a double CD nato, (1996).
