= Manuel Hedilla =

Spanish politician (1902–1970)

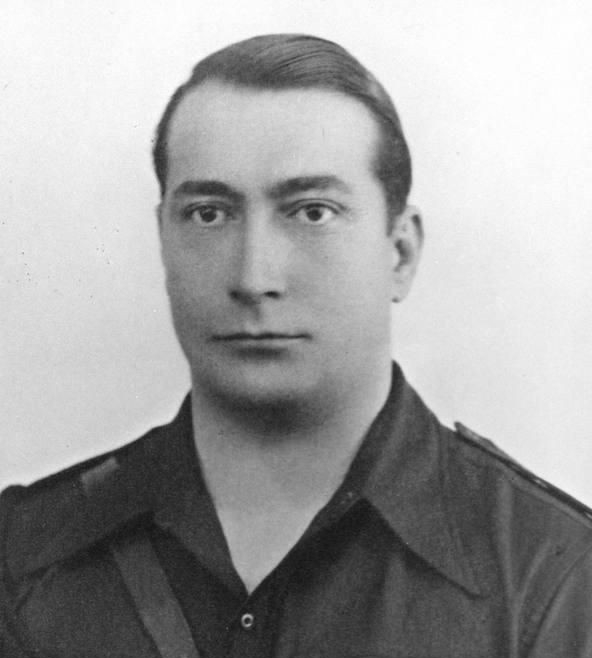
- Born: Manuel Hedilla Larrey; July 18, 1902; Ambrosero, Cantabria, Spain
- Died: February 4, 1970 (aged 67); Madrid, Spain
- Occupations: Mechanic, politician
- Notable work: Testamento politico de Manuel Hedilla (1972)
- Political party: FE de las JONS

Manuel Hedilla Larrey (July 18, 1902 – February 4, 1970) was a Spanish political figure who was a leading member of the Falange and an early rival for power towards Francisco Franco. He was a mechanic by trade.

== Early life ==
Hedilla was born in a village in Cantabria with his civil servant father dying when Hedilla was still a boy. He was educated at Roman Catholic schools in Bilbao before taking an apprenticeship as a shipyard worker, a route that led to unemployment as Spain's shipping industry was in terminal decline. Under the government of Miguel Primo de Rivera he returned to work on a road-building project, although he was once again unemployed following the collapse of that regime. He moved to Madrid to set up his own garage, although the business was a failure.

== Falangist involvement ==
In Madrid, Hedilla took up a job as an engineer at a Catholic dairy farm co-operative and whilst involved in this he joined the revolutionary wing of the Falange in 1934. Hedilla was an original member of the Falange and a close associate of José Antonio Primo de Rivera, who during the early stages of the Spanish Civil War was recognised as the leader of the so-called camisas viejas ("old shirts"). Indeed, immediately after Primo de Rivera's death he was briefly nominal leader of the Falange before Franco quickly established full control of the movement for himself.

== Clash with Franco ==
Although nominally the Falangist leader in Santander, Hedilla was based in A Coruña when the northern uprising began. He thus took charge of securing this city and was responsible for the bloody repressions. Despite this Hedilla, who was on the left wing of the Falange and emphasised the proletarian and syndicalist nature of the movement soon became a critic of the indiscriminate violence being perpetrated by the Nationalists. Following the death of José Antonio Primo de Rivera Hedilla was nominated as his successor but he was soon at the centre of a power struggle between himself and the legitimistas led by Agustín Aznar and Sancho Dávila y Fernández de Celis. Hedilla's pro-social reform position won the support of the German ambassador General Wilhelm Faupel and, although Hedilla was not directly involved, his followers took the initiative in Salamanca on April 16, 1937, by attempting to wrest control of the Falangist headquarters from rightist leader Sancho Dávila.

In the aftermath of the event Hedilla secured his own leadership of the Falange two days later although his triumph was short-lived as Franco checked his power by immediately announcing the formation of the Spanish Traditionalist Phalanx of the Assemblies of National-Syndicalist Offensive as a grand party of all his followers, including Hedilla's followers. Problems were escalated when Hedilla's close ally José Sáinz Nothnagel sent a telegram to Falangist leaders telling them to ignore all merger orders apart from those delivered 'through proper hierarchical channels'. Whilst the message was vague as to whom the proper channels actually meant it was taken by Franco and his supporters to be a warning that only Hedilla should be obeyed and thus increased tension. Believing that his power would be increased by maintaining Falangist independence, Hedilla refused to join the council of the new movement. However he overestimated his power and was arrested on April 25 and sentenced to death for treason the following month. However, on the advice of Ramón Serrano Súñer, who feared losing the Falange, the sentence was commuted to life imprisonment and ultimately Hedilla would only serve four years. Mindful of the need to keep the Falangists onside, Franco appointed another 'Old Shirt', Raimundo Fernández-Cuesta, as leader of the Movement.

== Autobiography controversy ==
A controversial episode occurred towards the end of his life when Hedilla hired pro-Falange journalist Maximiano Garcia Venero to write his memoirs. The volume that they produced gave a somewhat critical interpretation of Franco during the civil war and, under pressure from the government, Hedilla decided against publishing. Garcia Venero then sought to have the volume published outside Spain by the leftist Ruedo Ibérico, a publisher controlled by the Revolutionary Antifascist Patriotic Front (FRAP) and the book appeared in 1967 under the title La Falange en la guerra de España: la Unificación y Hedilla. However given that the publisher was avowedly left-wing a companion volume by Herbert R. Southworth, highly critical of Hedilla, appeared simultaneously. Garcia Venero and his subject fell out over the issue with Hedilla bringing a lawsuit and the writer publishing a new book in Spain in 1970 that was much more critical of Hedilla. By 1972 Hedilla's heirs, who gained ownership of the original manuscripts in the court case, were allowed to publish it and other writings under the title Testamento politico de Manuel Hedilla.
