= Agustín Aznar =

Political figure during the Spanish Civil War (1911–1984)

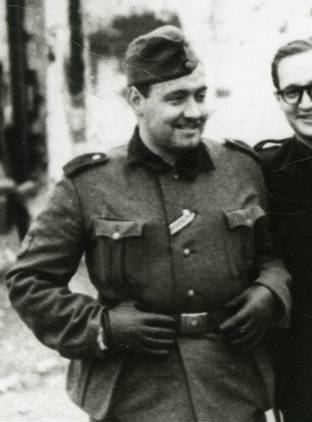
- Aznar in c. 1941–1943

Member of the Cortes Españolas
- In office 1961–1976

Personal details
- Born: Agustín Aznar Gerner; 18 August 1911 Madrid, Spain
- Died: 2 May 1984 (aged 72) Madrid, Spain
- Party: FET y de las JONS
- Other political affiliations: FE de las JONS
- Occupation: Politician

Military service
- Allegiance: Spain; Nazi Germany
- Branch/service: Spanish Army; Heer
- Unit: Blue Division (1941–1943)
- Battles/wars: Spanish Civil War; World War II: Eastern Front
- Awards: Iron Cross

Agustín Aznar Gerner (18 August 1911 – 2 May 1984) was a Spanish medical doctor, political activist with the Falange and a leading figure during the Spanish Civil War. Aznar was part of a radical element within the followers of Francisco Franco and at times represented a challenge to his leadership.

== Early years ==
The son of the academic Severino Aznar, Aznar studied medicine at the Universidad Central de Madrid, where his father was a sociology lecturer. He specialised in haematology and would ultimately serve as Chief Professor of the Central Laboratory and the Haematological Service.

Aznar's political involvement also began in his student days and in 1935 he was the founder and leader of the Falangist student union, the Sindicato Español Universitario. Known as a burly adventurer who held the Greco-Roman wrestling title in Castille, he was appointed chief of the Madrid section of the Falange militia and took part in several bloody street-fights with leftist opponents. With the Falange outlawed in March 1936, Aznar began the civil war in prison but was quickly released when Nationalists took charge of the area.

At the beginning of the civil war Aznar was appointed jefe of the national militias in succession to Luis Aguilar who had been killed. In this role he was close to Hans Joachim von Knobloch, the German consul in Alicante and in 1936 the two co-operated in a scheme to secure the release of the captured Falangist leader José Antonio Primo de Rivera through bribery. The plan failed and Aznar narrowly escaped capture himself, although the scheme was typical of his adventuring reputation. He also campaigned vigorously to prevent the incorporation of the Falangist militias into a proposed united Nationalist force under Juan Yagüe, being suspicious of the Carlism of Yagüe and the other generals.

== Power struggle ==
Following the execution of Primo de Rivera, Aznar became one of the leading figures in a power struggle in the Falange. Along with Sancho Dávila y Fernández de Celis he formed the leadership of a group known as the legitimistas who were opposed to the leadership of Primo de Rivera's chosen successor Manuel Hedilla. In an attempt to secure his position Hedilla organised an extraordinary meeting of the Falange, although trouble was promised as both he and Aznar organised their own militias in the run-up to the meeting. It was Aznar who struck first, using his militia to seize to depose Hedilla on April 16, 1937, and instead placing at the head of the Falange a triumvirate made up of himself, Sancho Dávila and their ally José Moreno.

Hedilla hit back however, enlisting the help of Finnish fascist Carl von Haartman, who led Hedilla's troops in capturing the Falangist Headquarters from Aznar's forces. With the struggle threatening to impact the war effort Franco stepped in to publicly back Hedilla and ensure the arrest of Aznar, Sancho Dávila and the others. However, Franco used the opportunity to effectively neutralise the Falange by immediately announcing the formation of the Falange Española Tradicionalista y de las Juntas de Ofensiva Nacional-Sindicalista, effectively making the post of head of the Falange little more than ceremonial. Aznar was briefly imprisoned although he was soon released and appointed to the by then weakened Falangist National Council.

== Return to politics ==
Despite his personal loss of face Aznar, who was released from prison very soon afterwards, was quickly reconciled to Franco's new movement and was appointed to the post of assessor of militias. A member of the group's 12-man Junta Politica, Aznar joined with Fernando González Vélez in 1938 in an attempt to radicalise the movement along the lines of Italian fascism and Nazism and to make the party more important. The proposals of the Aznar group, delivered to the Junta by his ally Dionisio Ridruejo, sparked another possible schism, this time with the monarchist faction of Pedro Sainz Rodríguez who were repulsed by what they saw as the republicanism of fascism. Again Franco sided against Aznar and had both he and González Vélez imprisoned for the plot. Franco's decision had been aided by an earlier intelligence report he had received which stated that Aznar and González Vélez were plotting against him, although there is little evidence to suggest that this was true. He was released in November 1939 and allowed to return to some prominence within the party.

== Pro-Nazi activity ==
Disenchanted by the conservative path adopted by the Franco regime Aznar, along with the likes of Ridruejo and other original Falangists such as the García-Noblejas brothers, joined the Blue Division during the Second World War. Also serving in the fairly minor role of National Delegate for Health in the government, Aznar became associated with the efforts of José Luis de Arrese to increase ties with the Nazis following his war service. Combining his two roles Aznar instigated a scheme by which Spanish doctors could work in German hospitals and this programme continued until late 1944.

== Post-war ==
Like most of the pro-Nazis within the Franco government, Aznar was sidelined in 1945 as a new pro-western and anti-communist policy was adopted by El Caudillo. Nonetheless, he retained a post on the Falange's Junta Politica until 1958, having first been appointed to the body in the 1930s. He was appointed to the Cortes Españolas, a largely ceremonial body with little real power, in 1961 and remained in place in 1976 when he was one of the deputies to vote against the lifting of the ban on political parties.

His political involvement ended with the restoration of constitutional monarchy and he served as head of the blood transfusion service in a Madrid hospital.
