= Josep Antoni Coderch =

Spanish architect

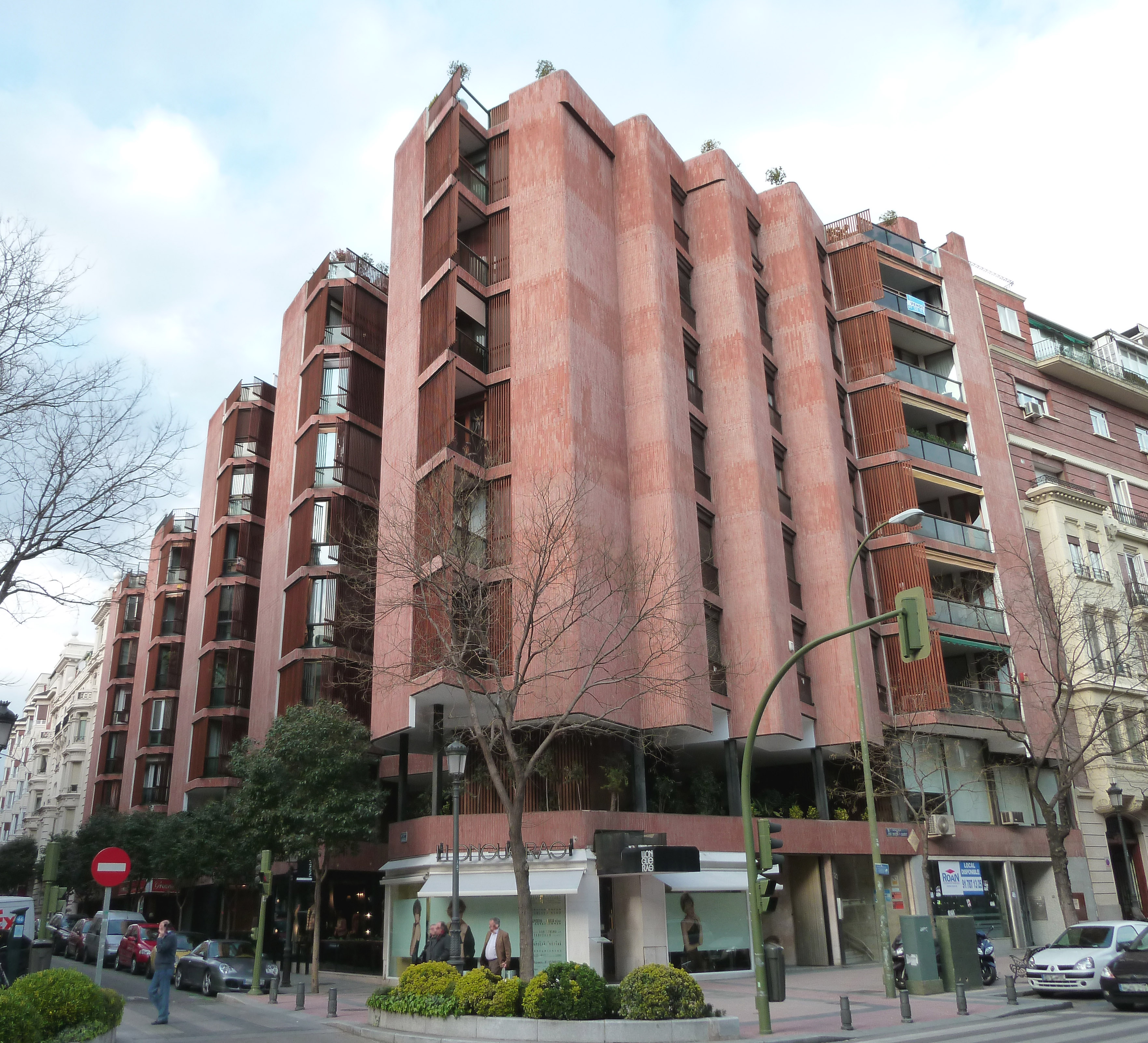
Edificio Girasol

José Antonio Coderch y de Sentmenat (Barcelona, 26 November 1913 in Barcelona, 6 November 1984) was a Spanish architect recognized as one of the most important post-World War II architects.

== Early life and career ==
In 1932 Coderch started studying architecture at the Barcelona School of Architecture, which he graduated in 1940. He started his office with Manual Valls in 1942. After graduating he worked in Madrid with Pedro Muguruza and Secundino Zuazo. Years later, he was appointed city architect of Sitges, where he designed the Civil Guard garrison. After joining the CIAM, he became a member of Team 10 in 1960.

== Career ==
Around the year 1951, Josep Antoni Coderch participated in a design for the Triennale di Milano. The Milan Triennale is a museum for art and design located in Milan, Italy. During this time, Coderch introduced the Ugalde house and changed the entire view of Spanish and Mediterranean architecture. The Ugalde house was one of the first projects of Josep Antoni Coderch to have Mediterranean elements while also being "modern". At the same time, the house wasn't just a return to the roots, it showed a clear move towards modern architecture while moving away from his traditional style seen in his earlier projects. After the Ugalde house, Coderch kept refining that Mediterranean and modern approach, he mostly designed for residential and small-scaled works and became more established in Spain.

== Use of Materiality and Environmental Elements ==
The material palette that Coderch used for the Ugalde house was drawn from the surrounding buildings, including white masonry walls, terracotta roof tiles and timber elements while still expressing a modern sensibility. Coderch also used thick walls to help regulate the interior temperature, keeping the summers cool and winters warm. In addition, deep-set windows were also used to block the harsh sunlight while still framing views and working with passive environmental strategies, making the climate an integral part of the design.

== Influence ==
Coderch's work was influenced by traditional Mediterranean architecture, especially with local materials and climate responsive designs. He also engaged with modern architecture and used it to reflect regional context and human scale. Coderch's approach balanced modernism with a focus in place, and that led to a certain style that is contemporary and locally grounded.

== Reintroducing Modernism to Spain ==
Josep Antoni Coderch played a really big role in reintroducing modern architecture to Spain after the war. Around that time, a large number of architects leaned towards traditional architectural styles, but Coderch took a different approach and reinterpreted modernism in a way that combines local climate, materials and cultural context together.

== Buildings ==
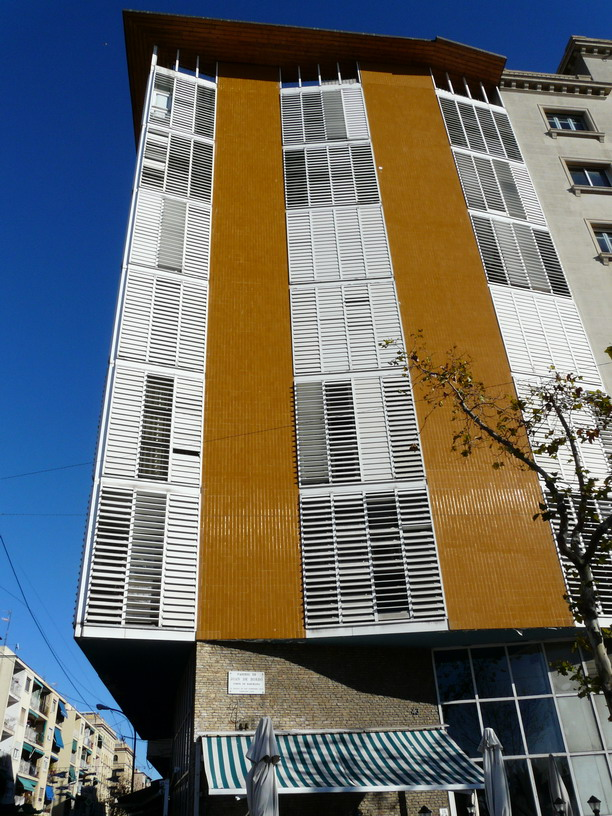
Casa de la Marina, Barcelona

- 1951 Ugalde House, Barcelona
- 1951 Casa de la Marina, Barcelona
- 1952 Spanish pavilion of the Triennale in Milan, Italy
- 1955-56 Casa Senillosa, Cadaqués
- 1957 Ballvè House, Camprodón, Girona
- 1957 Olano House, Comillas, Cantabria
- 1961 Biosca House, Igualada, Barcelona
- 1962 Hotel del Mar, Palma, Majorca
- 1964 Luque House, Sant Cugat del Vallès, Barcelona
- 1965 Gili House, Sitges
- 1966 Entrecanales House, La Moraleja, Madrid
- 1967 Rovira House, Canet de Mar, Barcelona
- 1969-71 Soler-Badia House, Igualada, Barcelona
- 1970-72 Zóbel House, Sotogrande, Cádiz
- 1971 Güell House, Barcelona
