= FET y de las JONS =

Sole ruling political party in Francoist Spain

Traditionalist Spanish Phalanx of the Councils of the National Syndicalist Offensive Falange Española Tradicionalista y de las Juntas de Ofensiva Nacional Sindicalista
- Founder: Francisco Franco
- Founded: 19 April 1937; 89 years ago
- Dissolved: 7 April 1977; 49 years ago
- Merger of: FE de las JONS; Comunión Tradicionalista
- Headquarters: Calle de Alcalá 44, Madrid
- Newspaper: Arriba
- Student wing: Sindicato Español Universitario
- Labour wing: Spanish Syndical Organization
- Membership: approx. 980,054 (1973 est.)
- Ideology: Fascism (Note: Primarily before 1945 and during the "First Francoism" phase: Blinkhorn 2003, pp. 10–11: "the Franco regime-the only European regime with a major radical fascist ingredient to survive long beyond 1945, and studied here by Paul Preston—is a useful example. Notwithstanding the aforementioned fascisant tendencies within the Spanish Catholic and monarchist right, radical fascism, in the form of the Falange (fused from 1934 with the JONS), was weak until 1936 when it began to expand rapidly, not least through the recruitment of disillusioned JAP-ists. [...] The product, like the Italian Fascist regime, was a compromise between radical fascism and conservative authoritarianism, in this case with unambiguous military and Church support. As Preston indicates, Falangism played a superficially prominent and important role for as long as it suited Franco, that is, until the mid-1940s, thereafter to be shunned into the sidings of Spanish political life."; Blinkhorn 2014, p. 94: "... it is probably reasonable to suggest that the 1940s represented a 'fascist phase' that then gave way to something more conventionally authoritarian."; Griffin & Feldman 2004, pp. 82–83; Albanese & Hierro 2016, p. 54: "It was the FET-JONS, the main actor in Spain, which wanted the full fascistization of the country and which was most active during the period in trying to achieve it through the so-called 'syndicalist revolution'. This should not come as a surprise; Falange did not need the fascistization process, since it was already fully fascist from the beginning. Further, relations between Falange and Italy had become increasingly stronger since the Spanish Civil War, to the extent that Mussolini saw the Spanish party at the main vehicle capable of transforming Spain into a fully fascist country. Similarly, FET-jons also regarded Mussolini's Italy as its main point of reference and even asked the authorities in Rome for advice about carrying out the fascistization process of the Francoist regime as effectively as possible."; Thomàs 2020, pp. 38–39: "Al referirnos a fascismo español lo hacemos a dos organizaciones diferentes. En primer lugar al partido fascista Falange Española de las JONS, que existió entre 1934 y el 19 de abril de 1937; y en segundo, al partido único del régimen franquista, Falange Española Tradicionalista y de las JONS, creado el último día citado y subsistente durante toda la vigencia del Franquismo -ni más ni menos que hasta abril de 1977, aunque en 1958 trocó su denominación por la de Movimiento Nacional. Existieron así dos organizaciones fascistas diferentes, aunque la segunda nació en parte de la primera y la integró." ["When we refer to Spanish fascism, we refer to two different organisations. Firstly, the national syndicalist party Falange Española de las JONS, which existed between 1934 and 19 April 1937; and secondly, the sole party of the Franco regime, Falange Española Tradicionalista y de las JONS, created on the latter day and which lasted throughout the duration of Francoism - no more and no less than until April 1977, although in 1958 it changed its name to the National Movement. Thus, there were two different fascist organisations, although the second was born in part from the first and integrated it."]; Paxton 2004, p. 150: "Franco's regime did have a single party — the Falange — but without "parallel structures" it lacked autonomous power. [...] After 1945 the Falange became a colorless civic solidarity association, normally referred to simply as the Movimiento. In 1970 its very name was; abolished. By then Franquist Spain had long become an authoritarian regime... with almost no visible fascist coloration."); Authoritarian conservatism
- Political position: Far-right
- Religion: Roman Catholicism
- Colours: Red Black Blue
- Anthem: "Cara al Sol" (transl. 'Facing the Sun')

Party flag

The Falange Española Tradicionalista y de las Juntas de Ofensiva Nacional Sindicalista (lit. 'Traditionalist Spanish Phalanx of the Councils of the National Syndicalist Offensive'), abbreviated FET y de las JONS and commonly known as the Falange, (Note: alternatively referred to as the Movimiento Nacional (lit. 'National Movement') or just the Movimiento) was the sole legal political party of Francoist Spain from its creation in 1937 until its dissolution in 1977.

The party was established by Spanish caudillo Francisco Franco on 19 April 1937 through the Unification Decree, which forcibly and officially merged the Falange Española de las JONS (FE de las JONS) with the Traditionalist Communion. The new party formally retained 26 of the 27 points of the original Falangist platform, along with its symbols (the blue shirt, the yoke and arrows, and the anthem Cara al Sol), but in practice functioned as a broad nationalist coalition under Franco's personal authority rather than as an ideologically coherent movement. The party was founded shortly after Fascist Italy's official Roberto Farinacci met with Franco in March 1937 and advised him to unite the Nationalists into a single fascist "Spanish National Party".

Membership was automatic for all civil servants and military officers of the regime, though such membership was often purely nominal. The party reached peak membership of approximately 932,000 in 1942. The original Falangists' influence within the regime gradually declined relative to other factions, particularly the Catholic technocrats associated with Opus Dei. There was division as to who should be head of state of Spain within the party with two monarchist movements claiming the right to rule Spain, the Alfonsists and the Carlists who had previously been part of the Traditionalist Communion; Franco ruled as a regent from 1947 to 1975 with him in 1969 choosing Juan Carlos of the Alfonsist line of the House of Bourbon to succeed him as the King of Spain, ending the significance of Carlism within the party. Following the death of Franco in November 1975 and the beginning of Spain's transition to democracy, the party and all associated institutions were dissolved on 7 April 1977.

The regime's internal composition was never monolithic. Scholars have described Francoism as a coalition of competing political "families" (camisa vieja Falangists, Carlists, military officers, National Catholics, and technocrats) whose relative influence shifted over nearly four decades of rule. The party's affiliated organisations, including the Sección Femenina, the Frente de Juventudes, and the Spanish Syndical Organization, were the primary means through which the regime shaped the daily lives of most Spaniards.

== History ==
=== Origins and predecessor parties ===
The FET y de las JONS had its roots in three distinct political formations that emerged on the Spanish right in the early 1930s. The first was the Falange Española, founded in October 1933 by José Antonio Primo de Rivera, son of the former military dictator Miguel Primo de Rivera. It was a self-consciously fascist movement, influenced by Italian fascism and drawing on themes of national renewal, anti-Marxism, and social revolution. The second was the Juntas de Ofensiva Nacional-Sindicalista (JONS), a national syndicalist organisation led by Ramiro Ledesma Ramos and Onésimo Redondo. The two merged in February 1934 to form the Falange Española de las JONS (FE de las JONS), though the merged party remained an ideologically fractious grouping with a membership unlikely to have exceeded ten thousand before the outbreak of civil war.

The third constituent was the Traditionalist Communion, the principal Carlist movement. Unlike the Falange, Carlism was a mass movement with deep roots in the rural north of Spain, particularly Navarre, combining dynastic legitimism with fervent Roman Catholic piety and a rejection of liberal modernity. Although the Carlists and Falangists had little ideological common ground, the former being clerically oriented monarchists and the latter anti-clerical and nominally revolutionary, both organisations backed the military uprising that began in July 1936.

=== The Spanish Civil War ===
With the outbreak of the Spanish Civil War in July 1936, the Falange fought alongside the Nationalist faction against the Second Spanish Republic. The collapse of normal political life and the mobilisation of the war rapidly transformed the party: from a marginal grouping of several thousand, it expanded to several hundred thousand members within months. Many of these new recruits, derisively called camisas nuevas ("new shirts") by veteran members, joined for reasons of wartime opportunism rather than ideological conviction. Around 60 per cent of pre-war Falange members lost their lives during the conflict, a higher proportion than any other party that fought on the Nationalist side.

José Antonio Primo de Rivera, arrested by Republican authorities in March 1936, was held in Alicante. Having lost his parliamentary immunity when the Falange failed to win seats in the February 1936 elections, he was tried, sentenced to death, and executed on 20 November 1936, a date subsequently commemorated in Spain as 20-N. His death conferred martyrdom status within the movement; thereafter he was referred to among the Falangist leadership as el Ausente ("the Absent One"). Command passed to Manuel Hedilla, but his authority was contested by rival factions within the organisation. The Carlist forces, the Requetés, mobilised in large numbers from Navarre, fighting as a distinct military formation throughout the conflict. The Falange's women's wing, the Sección Femenina, led by Pilar Primo de Rivera, the younger sister of José Antonio, grew to more than half a million members by the end of the war, providing nursing and logistical support to the Nationalist forces.

=== Unification and foundation (1937) ===
Internal tensions within the Falange came to a head in April 1937. A power struggle between Hedilla and his rivals, the legitimistas associated with Agustín Aznar and Sancho Dávila y Fernández de Celis, threatened to fracture the Nationalist coalition at a critical moment in the war. Franco used the crisis as a pretext to impose his own solution. On 19 April 1937, Franco issued the Unification Decree, forcibly merging the FE de las JONS with the Traditionalist Communion to create the Falange Española Tradicionalista y de las JONS. The decree named only the Falange and the Traditionalist Communion explicitly; all other parties in the Nationalist zone were dissolved by omission, with their members required to apply individually to join the new organisation. Franco assumed the title of jefe nacional ("National Chief"), following the model of a fascist party.

Hedilla refused to endorse the merger and was subsequently arrested. Sentenced to death by a military tribunal, his sentence was commuted to exile, which he served in Mallorca until 1947. The leader of the Traditionalist Communion, Manuel Fal Conde, was in exile in Portugal at the time of the decree and continued opposing it from there. Franco personally invited him to join the National Council of the FET in November 1937; he refused, and the offer was permanently withdrawn on 6 March 1938. The Count of Rodezno, second in seniority among the Carlists, was nonetheless appointed Minister of Justice.

The merged party formally adopted the Falangists' 27 puntos (Twenty-Seven Points) as its platform, minus the clause prohibiting party mergers, the only point dropped. Falangist symbols were retained wholesale: the blue shirt, the yoke and arrows emblem, the red-and-black flag, and the anthem Cara al Sol. In practice, however, the FET y de las JONS was from the outset a heterogeneous nationalist coalition rather than a unified fascist party. Many original Falangists felt their revolutionary programme had been subordinated to conservative military interests, while Carlists resented absorption into a movement they considered ideologically alien. Following the Nationalist victory, most of the property and premises of all banned parties and trade unions were transferred to the FET y de las JONS.

=== The party under Francoism (1939–1959) ===
After the Nationalist victory in 1939, the FET y de las JONS served both as the institutional vehicle for the regime's ideology and as a career structure for politically ambitious Spaniards. New converts, known as camisas nuevas in contrast to the ideological veterans, treated party membership primarily as a professional credential. Membership rose steadily, peaking at around 932,000 in 1942. Although Raimundo Fernández-Cuesta was formally the party's first Secretary General, the most powerful figure within the Falange in these early years was Ramón Serrano Suñer, Franco's brother-in-law, who held the presidency of the party's Political Council and exercised enormous influence from his position as Minister of the Interior.

The years 1940–1942 represented the high-water mark of Falangist influence within the regime. Serrano Suñer and the most radical Falangist factions saw Spain's potential entry into the war on the Axis side as an opportunity to complete the national syndicalist revolution that had remained unfinished since the end of the Civil War. Between 1940 and 1941, however, the Falange's agitation campaign brought it into sharp conflict with powerful anti-Falangist factions within the Army. This crisis, known in the historiography as the Crisis of May 1941, led Franco to conduct a major government reshuffle. Serrano Suñer was transferred from the Interior Ministry to the Foreign Ministry, and his supporters lost influence to more conservative and Franco-loyal Falangists. The compliant Agustín Muñoz Grandes and subsequently José Luis de Arrese took over the Secretary Generalship, and Arrese immediately initiated an internal purge of the most "uncontrolled" or "leftist" elements who had joined during the war; over the following years, around 4,000 militants were expelled. The vertical syndicates were similarly purged: the national delegate of the syndicates, Gerardo Salvador Merino, and his supporters were removed, and the syndicates abandoned their revolutionary positions.

Internal tensions erupted violently in August 1942 during the Begoña Incident, when hardline Falangist militants threw grenades at a Carlist religious gathering in Bilbao. Carlist-sympathising ministers José Enrique Varela and Valentín Galarza pressed for action against the Falangists, while Falangist ministers pushed back. Franco dismissed several ministers on both sides, using the incident primarily to remove the remaining radical Falangists from government. Six Falangists were convicted of the attack; one, Juan José Domínguez Muñoz, was executed.

From November 1942, radical Falangists were effectively excluded from the party's leadership, which after the formation of its third National Council came to be dominated by figures loyal to Franco rather than to any ideological programme. This change coincided with the shifting course of the Second World War, particularly after the Battle of Stalingrad, which proved catastrophic for Germany. Franco began distancing himself from the fascist powers, and in September 1943 issued instructions that the FET y de las JONS should henceforth be referred to officially as a "movement" rather than a "party."

=== Post-war reorientation (1945–1957) ===
Following the Allied victory in 1945, the international position of Francoist Spain became precarious. The post of Secretary General of the Movement, held by Arrese, was abolished in the July 1945 government reshuffle, and Franco left it deliberately vacant — in part as a signal to the Allied powers that the regime was distancing itself from its fascist past. The party was effectively silenced for several years.

From 1948, however, conditions improved for the regime internationally and the party was reactivated, entering what some historians have described as a second period of influence. Fernández-Cuesta was reappointed Secretary General in November 1948, though initially without ministerial rank. In 1953 the party held its first congress — and what would prove to be its last — at which it passed a declaration warning that the Falange would not tolerate "under any pretext the illegitimate actions of cliques seeking to diminish its role as the sole inspiration of the State and, consequently, the authority of its Chief and Caudillo."

In 1956, Secretary General Arrese, returned for a second term, drafted a project to significantly strengthen the Falange's political role within the regime's constitutional structure. The proposal met with fierce opposition from the Army, the Church, and monarchist factions, and was quickly abandoned. Following the government reshuffle of 1957, Falange lost much of its remaining influence to the Opus Dei-linked technocrats who now dominated economic policy. In 1958 the Ley de Principios Fundamentales del Movimiento was passed, which some historians have regarded as marking the effective end of the FET y de las JONS as a distinct political entity; from that point the term "Movement" became definitively dominant and the Falangist ideological foundations dissolved into a loose amalgam of positions.

=== Ideology and internal "families" ===
The regime's ideological character was never monolithic. Scholars have described Francoism as a coalition of competing "families" (familias del régimen) whose internal balance shifted over the decades of Franco's rule. The principal groupings were the Falangists (azules, or "blues," from the colour of their shirts), the ideological heirs of FE de las JONS who emphasised national syndicalism and a corporatist state and whose influence was greatest in the early 1940s; the Carlists (requetés), Catholic traditionalists and monarchists whose devotion to throne and altar sat awkwardly with the Falangist programme; the military (militares), generally conservative and suspicious of Falangist radicalism; the National Catholics (nacionalcatólicos), who saw the regime primarily as a defence of the Church against liberalism and communism and who grew increasingly dominant from the mid-1940s onward; and, from the late 1950s, a new generation of technocrats, many linked to Opus Dei, whose economic development programme transformed Spain and further marginalised the traditional Falangist wing.

The official ideology of the Movimiento Nacional was encapsulated in the slogan ¡Una, Grande y Libre!, meaning Spain as one (indivisible), great (imperial), and free (from foreign interference). In practice, the regime's ideological emphasis shifted considerably over its nearly four decades, from the overt fascism of the early 1940s to a form of technocratic authoritarian conservatism by the 1960s.

=== Decline and dissolution (1959–1977) ===
From the late 1950s, the Falange's role within the regime became increasingly ceremonial. The Spanish miracle of the 1960s, a period of rapid economic growth associated with Opus Dei-affiliated technocrats, sidelined the party's national syndicalist economics in favour of market liberalisation and foreign investment. The student union, the Sindicato Español Universitario (SEU), was dissolved in 1965 amid a wave of university unrest that the party proved incapable of managing. By the early 1970s, membership was shrinking and ageing: in 1974 the average age of Falangists in Madrid was at least 55, and new recruits came predominantly from the conservative Catholic rural north. Although there were still 27,806 new memberships recorded in 1969, these were insufficient to offset the deaths of the party's ageing old guard.

Political developments within the regime also caused internal fractures. Changes to the regime's constitutional arrangements, including the Organic Law of the State and the designation of Juan Carlos de Borbón as Franco's successor, generated dissension within the party. In 1969 a veteran camisa vieja, Francisco Herranz, committed suicide in the centre of Madrid as a protest against the direction the regime was taking. On 3 April 1970, a law formally abolished the name Falange Española Tradicionalista y de las JONS, which had been the official designation since 1937, and permanently enshrined "Movimiento Nacional" as the sole legal name. By 1973 the Movement had approximately 980,054 registered members, one of the highest totals in its history in absolute terms, but proportionally far lower relative to the total population than it had been during the Arrese years, and with participation in party life dramatically reduced.

Franco died on 20 November 1975, the thirty-ninth anniversary of José Antonio Primo de Rivera's execution. King Juan Carlos I, whom Franco had designated his successor, appointed Adolfo Suárez as Prime Minister in July 1976. Suárez, who had himself served as Secretary General of the Movimiento from December 1975 to July 1976, used his knowledge of the regime's institutions to oversee their dismantlement from within. The Political Reform Law, passed by the Francoist Cortes in November 1976, cleared the way for multi-party elections. On 7 April 1977, the Suárez government issued a royal decree formally dissolving the FET y de las JONS and all Movimiento Nacional institutions. All personnel of the dissolved organisations were transferred to the state civil service as public functionaries; workers from the Sección Femenina, for example, were mostly reassigned to State Libraries, a measure that met with strong opposition from the existing body of professional librarians. Spain's first free general elections since 1936 took place on 15 June 1977. Several successor parties emerged in the following months, among them the refounded Falange Española de las JONS (established 1976) and the Círculos Doctrinales José Antonio.

== Ideology ==
=== Fascism ===
Historians have long disagreed over how to classify the ideology of the FET y de las JONS and the Francoist regime more broadly. The influential political sociologist Juan José Linz argued that Francoism was best understood as an authoritarian regime rather than a fully fascist one, stressing its limited political mobilisation, the heterogeneous composition of its ruling coalition, and the predominance of the army, the Church, and conservative elites over the single-party model found in Fascist Italy and Nazi Germany. Stanley Payne similarly characterised the regime as authoritarian with a fascist component rather than fully fascist, noting that the Falange was never independently strong enough to dominate Spanish politics.

Other historians have challenged this view. Martin Blinkhorn following Paul Preston described the Franco regime as "the only European regime with a major radical fascist ingredient to survive long beyond 1945," characterising it as a compromise between radical fascism and conservative authoritarianism in which Falangism played a prominent role for as long as it suited Franco, before being "shunned into the sidings of Spanish political life." According to such historians as Preston and Blinkhorn, here Spain functioned similarly to Italy, where the National Fascist Party, similarly to the FET y de las JONS, was an alliance from radical Fascism and Clerico-Fascism and conservatism, and where the power was also balanced between the party and conservative institutions like the monarchy and the army. After 1945, Falangists were increasingly frustrated, but Falangist officials continued supporting the regime. Blinkhorn thus limits the classification of the regime as fascist to the early phase of the regime, writing that after the 1940s it shifted towards more conventional authoritarianism. Other than that, such historians wrote that the unification of the Nationalist factions into the Falange only formalized the already existing unity: in the 1930s, the Spanish anti-Republican right shared certain fascisant tendencies and a "pre-fascist" culture; in later developments and the radicalization of the Civil War, they, including the rebel army, underwent the process of further fascisation, and in war, the right-wing parties and the military rebels within the Nationalist faction displayed a unity of "regiments in the same army," with people often being members of all these organizations at the same time. Scholars including Matteo Albanese and Pablo del Hierro have argued that the FET y de las JONS actively sought the full fascistisation of Spain, regarded Mussolini's Italy as its principal point of reference, and even sought advice from Rome on how to carry out that process most effectively. Historian Joan Maria Thomàs has argued that the FET y de las JONS should be understood as a distinct fascist organisation in its own right, born in part from the original Falange but constituting a separate entity that persisted throughout the entirety of the Francoist period. Certain historians noted that Francoism as a distinct ideology was different from the pre-war Falangism as it was shaped by the radicalization of the Civil War. As they wrote, Francoism was drowing on the common elements of the Nacionales, with one of the main one being "combatitive Christianity"; thus, under Franco, the ideological reference point of the "New Man" present in fascist ideologies was distinctive, taking the form of a "Christian knight", and in general, the central point of Francoism was the myth of the Civil War as a "bonfire" where the cleansing and rebirth of Spain was taking place.

=== Falangism and national syndicalism ===
The formal ideology of the FET y de las JONS was inherited from the original Falange, whose platform was codified in the 27 puntos (Twenty-Seven Points) of 1934. The merged party adopted 26 of these points wholesale, dropping only the clause prohibiting organisational mergers. The programme drew on national syndicalism, rejecting both Marxist class struggle and liberal individualism in favour of an organic, hierarchical state structured around vertical syndicates uniting workers and employers by industry in service of the nation. In place of class conflict, the Falangist programme promoted class collaboration, the idea that social harmony could be achieved by subordinating both labour and capital to the national interest within a corporatist framework. The programme also called for sweeping agrarian reform to redistribute land to peasants, the nationalisation of credit facilities to prevent what it characterised as capitalist usury, and basic respect for private property in other areas.

Falangism in its original form was explicitly ultranationalist and aspired to a totalitarian state. Historian Ismael Saz has described José Antonio Primo de Rivera's doctrine as "a full fascism, based on a mythical conception of a regenerative, populist and ultranationalist revolution, oriented to the construction of a totalitarian State as the basis and foundation of an orderly and enthusiastic, hierarchical and conquering national community." Modern ultranationalism was a component innate to Francoism as established in and after the Civil War as well: it developed in the course of the radicalisation of the Civil War within the Nacionales and also served for "neutering left-wing advances". The principle of totalitarianism became adopted by Francoism in its early years as well: Franco personally stressed the "missionary and totalitarian", similar to Italy and Germany, nature of the regime, and later this point was developed by his ideologists.

The 'social revolutionary' dimension of Falangism, its calls for agrarian reform and the nationalisation of banks, was central to its self-presentation as a movement that transcended the conventional left-right divide, though in practice this programme was never implemented under the Franco regime. Historians such as Paul Preston write that Falangism here presented a radical form of fascism, similarly to the radical social wing of Mussolini's National Fascist Party, while the implementation of their social principles which in practice favoured the conservative capitalist elites was similar to the one in Fascist Italy. In result, both the Falangist and Fascist radicals similarly lamented or were frustrated over the failures of their "revolutions".

=== Anti-clericalism and National Catholicism ===
The original Falange held explicitly anti-clerical positions, recognising Catholicism as central to Spanish identity while rejecting direct clerical influence in government and insisting on the supremacy of the state over the Church. This placed the Falangists in tension with their Carlist partners, who held a thoroughly clericalised vision of Spanish politics. After the 1937 unification and especially following the Nationalist victory in 1939, the anti-clerical strand of Falangism was progressively suppressed in favour of National Catholicism (nacionalcatolicismo): the identification of Spanish national identity with Roman Catholic faith, tradition, and civilisation. Under this doctrine, the Church was restored to a privileged position in education, family law, and public life. The regime characterised itself as a defender of Christian civilisation against communism and Freemasonry, which Franco personally regarded as existential threats.

=== Spanish nationalism, unionism, and irredentism ===
Spanish nationalism was a foundational commitment shared across all factions of the FET y de las JONS. The regime was committed to Spanish unionism, the indivisible unity of the Spanish state, expressed in the slogan ¡Una, Grande y Libre! and embodied in its suppression of Basque, Catalan, and Galician regional identities and languages. Some elements within the Falange also advocated Spanish irredentism, pressing claims to Gibraltar, territories in Morocco, and, in the most expansive formulations, areas of the Pyrenees held by France.

=== Corporatism and the corporate state ===
The economic organisation of the regime was based on corporate statism: the subordination of economic life to state direction through corporatist institutions. This was most visibly expressed in the Spanish Syndical Organization (sindicato vertical), which organised workers and employers in the same vertical hierarchy by sector rather than by class, replacing independent trade unions dissolved in 1938. The model drew on the corporate state theory developed in Fascist Italy, which had structured the economy around corporations serving as mediators between producers and the national interest.

=== Traditionalism ===
The incorporation of the Carlist movement into the FET y de las JONS introduced a significant traditionalist current into the party's ideological composition. Carlism brought with it a vision of Spain rooted in pre-liberal Catholic monarchy, fueros (regional customary laws), and a hierarchical social order. Some historians have argued that this traditionalist element, rather than fascism, constitutes the defining characteristic of Francoism as a whole, a position associated with scholars such as Gonzalo Redondo, who described Francoist authoritarianism as traditionalist rather than fascist in character. This view remains a minority position in the historiography, where the consensus leans toward understanding the regime as a hybrid of fascist and conservative-authoritarian elements.

=== Hispanidad and pan-Hispanism ===
A further ideological strand was the doctrine of Hispanidad, the pan-Hispanic unity of the Spanish-speaking world under Spanish cultural and moral leadership. Drawing on the work of the intellectual Ramiro de Maeztu, Hispanidad held that Spain's historical mission was to act as the guardian of a Hispanic civilisation encompassing all peoples shaped by the Spanish language, Catholic faith, and imperial heritage. This doctrine informed the regime's foreign policy ambitions in Latin America and underpinned the activities of the Servicio Exterior de Falange. The Council of Hispanidad, established by decree in November 1940, was intended to formalise this claimed leadership. In the Falangist programme, "empire" did not necessarily denote territorial conquest; Primo de Rivera himself conceived of it primarily in terms of cultural influence, with Spain acting as a spiritual axis of the Hispanic world.

== Symbolism and uniforms ==
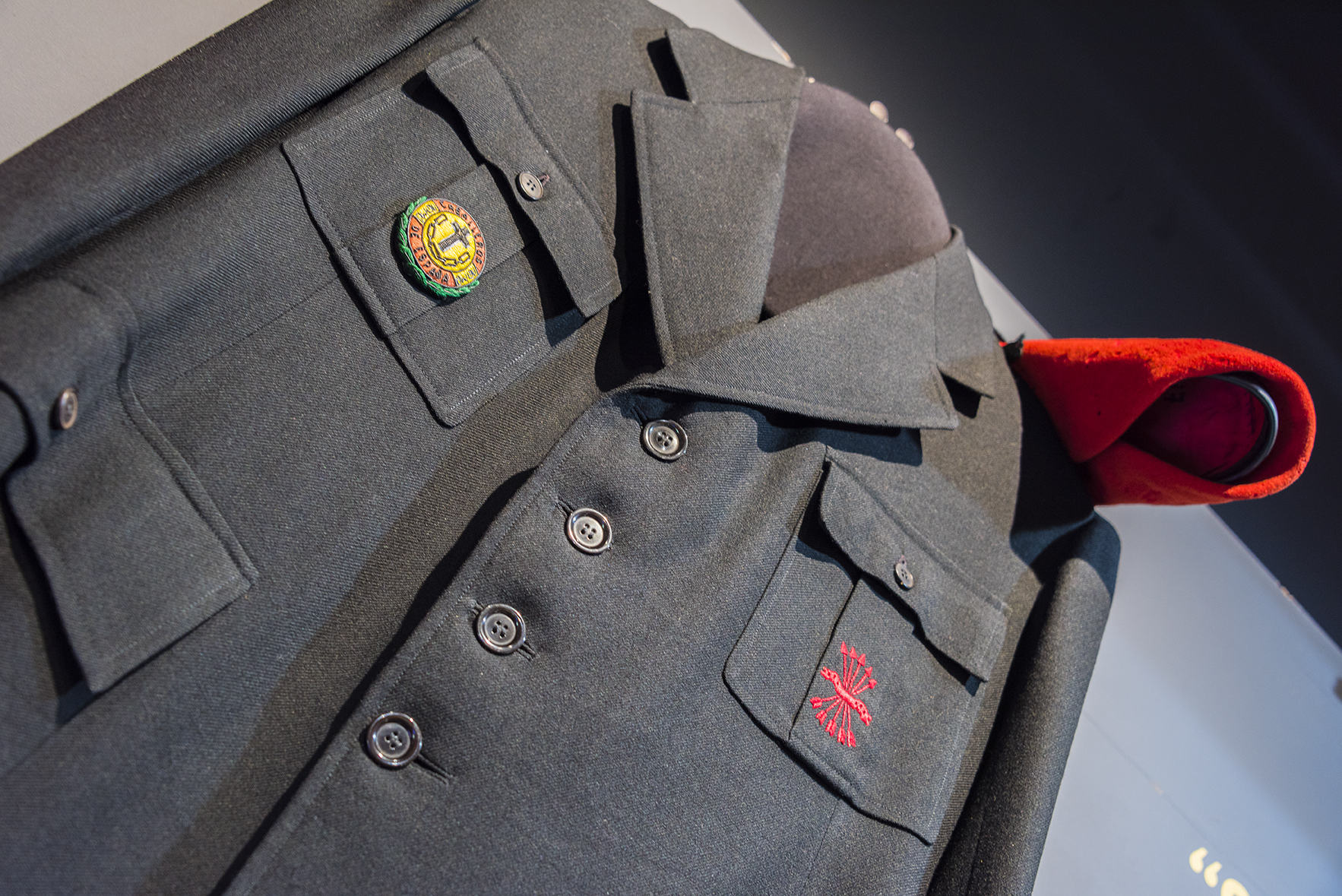
A party uniform part of the "Exhibition at the Valencian Museum of Ethnology"

The FET y de las JONS adopted a combination of symbols that reflected the diverse origins of its constituent factions. The party uniform combined the blue shirt of the Falange with the red beret of the Requetés, with a black tie added in mourning for José Antonio Primo de Rivera. The combination was never fully accepted by either side: many Falangists refused to wear the red beret as a standard element of the uniform and instead wore it on the shoulder epaulette of the blue shirt as a compromise; Carlists were equally resistant to wearing Falangist symbols.

The flags used at party events similarly reflected the coalition's dual heritage. The Spanish national flag presided over all occasions, flanked by the Falangist flag and the Cross of Burgundy of the Traditionalists. The principal anthem of the party was Cara al Sol, composed by musician Juan Tellería and others, but the Carlist hymn Oriamendi held formal co-official status throughout the duration of the dictatorship. The Roman salute (arm raised) and ritual cries such as ¡Arriba España! and España, Una, Grande y Libre completed the party's public ceremonial repertoire.

== Organisation ==
=== Party apparatus ===
The party was formally headed by Franco as jefe nacional, with authority described in the party statutes as "the most absolute," answerable only to "God and history." From the publication of the party statutes on 4 August 1937, this authority was absolute and personal. Day-to-day administration was handled by a Secretary General who held ministerial rank and sat in the Council of Ministers, making the post one of the most significant in the regime. The National Council served as a consultative body, though it exercised little independent authority in practice.

The original 1937 statutes established twelve organisational services: Foreign Service, National Education, Press and Propaganda, Sección Femenina, Social Works, Syndicates, Youth Organisation, Justice and Law, State Initiatives and Guidance, Movement Communications and Transport, Treasury and Administration, and the Information and Investigation Service. The 1939 statutes reorganised these and added two new bodies: the National Delegation for Former Prisoners (Delegación Nacional de Excautivos) and the National Delegation for Former Combatants (Delegación Nacional de Excombatientes). The National Delegation for Sports was established in 1941. A further reorganisation in July 1957 reduced the number of bodies directly dependent on the Secretary General, merging several delegations and abolishing the Excautivos and Excombatientes delegations.

Membership was formally voluntary, but in practice automatic for all civil servants, military officers, and anyone seeking a position in public life. The nominal character of much of this membership was widely understood: the party functioned less as a vehicle of mass ideological mobilisation than as a bureaucratic structure for distributing patronage and ensuring administrative loyalty.

=== Affiliated organisations ===
The party's affiliated organisations gave it reach across most areas of civil society and were, for most ordinary Spaniards, the primary point of contact with the Francoist political system. The Spanish Syndical Organization (Organización Sindical Española, OSE), known as the sindicato vertical, was the regime's compulsory labour structure, organising workers and employers within the same vertical hierarchy by industry rather than by class. It replaced the independent trade unions, which were dissolved in 1938. The OSE was the largest of the party's affiliated bodies and one of the most significant instruments of economic and social control under the regime. Subordinate organisations included the leisure and cultural body Educación y Descanso (Education and Rest).

The Sección Femenina ("Female Section") was the women's branch of the Falange, led throughout its existence by Pilar Primo de Rivera, the younger sister of José Antonio. Founded in June 1934 as part of the original FE de las JONS, it was incorporated into the FET y de las JONS following the 1937 Unification Decree. Under the Francoist regime, the Sección Femenina became one of the principal institutions through which the state shaped the lives of women, running compulsory programmes in home economics, physical education, and civic instruction. It promoted a vision of femininity centred on domesticity, Catholic piety, and service to nation and family, a role characterised by its leader as "a silent, constant labour." Historians have described the organisation as one of the few spaces in Francoist Spain where women held significant administrative authority, even as it enforced a subordinationist gender ideology. The Sección Femenina also had responsibility for bodies including the Auxilio Social and the Servicio Social de la Mujer. It was disbanded on 7 April 1977 alongside all other Movimiento Nacional institutions.

The Frente de Juventudes ("Youth Front") was the party's organisation for boys and young men, running camps, sports programmes, and civic education. Members were known as Flechas ("Arrows") and Pelayos, and most wore red berets. The Frente de Juventudes was restructured several times as youth disaffection, particularly among university students from the late 1950s, became increasingly difficult to manage through party channels.

The Sindicato Español Universitario (SEU) held a legal monopoly on student representation at Spanish universities. Founded before the Civil War as the Falange's student union, it was incorporated into the FET y de las JONS in 1937. By the late 1950s, growing student opposition to the regime made the SEU increasingly unworkable as a tool of control, and the university campuses became significant centres of anti-Francoist activity. The SEU was officially dissolved in 1965.

The party also operated an extensive media apparatus. The National Delegation of Press and Propaganda controlled both the Red de periódicos del Movimiento Nacional and the Cadena de Prensa del Movimiento, which included the Cadena Azul de Radiodifusión, the Cadena de Emisoras Sindicales, and the Red de Emisoras del Movimiento. The party's intelligence arm, the Servicio de Información e Investigación, functioned as an internal security service responsible for investigating opponents and compiling personal dossiers.

=== Foreign organisations ===
The regime's ambitions extended beyond Spain's borders through the Servicio Exterior de Falange (DNSEF, Delegación Nacional del Servicio Exterior de Falange), the party's foreign service. Established before the Civil War to organise Spanish emigrant communities, it was formally incorporated into the FET y de las JONS after the 1937 Unification Decree and became an instrument of the Franco regime for spreading its ideology abroad, particularly in Latin America.

The Servicio Exterior organised delegations across Latin America, building on the substantial Spanish diaspora communities in countries such as Argentina, Cuba, Chile, Mexico, and Uruguay. In Argentina alone, it had established around sixty delegations by October 1938. Its activities combined political organising with cultural propaganda advancing the doctrine of Hispanidad and social services including charity work, healthcare, and scholarships. Under Serrano Suñer as Foreign Minister, the organisation promoted an aggressively anti-American form of Hispanism. The United States government investigated Falangist activities in Latin America, particularly in Puerto Rico, where pro-Franco and pro-Falangist sentiment was elevated even among the governing classes. Some Falangists promoted the idea of supporting the independence struggles of former Spanish colonies against North American dominance.

The activities of the DNSEF attracted significant concern from the United States government, which characterised the Servicio Exterior as an instrument of Axis influence in the Western Hemisphere. Its perceived subversive role in the region was one of the factors that led the United States to impose an oil embargo on Spain in 1944. Beyond Latin America, support for Franco and the Falange was high among the Spanish community in the Philippines before the outbreak of the Second World War; the Philippine Falange collaborated with Japanese forces against United States military forces during the conquest of the Philippines in 1942. During the war, the Falange's intelligence services also cooperated closely with Axis secret services and took responsibility for political espionage and the surveillance of Allied diplomats in Francoist Spain.

Several Latin American governments expelled Falangist agents outright; Cuba and Mexico were particularly hostile. Delegations increasingly retreated from overt political activity into cultural work. The Servicio Exterior was formally dissolved in December 1945, as the regime began its post-war effort to distance itself from its former Axis associations, though cultural activities under the party secretariat continued in a reduced capacity into the 1950s.

=== Membership ===
Official "Active Membership" (Militantes activos) of the Falange-Movimiento, 1936–63
Year	Membership
1936	35,630
1937	240,000
1938	362,000
1939	650,000
1940	725,000
1941	890,000
1942	932,000
1943	925,000
1944	922,000
1945	908,000
1946	934,000
1947	933,000
1948	941,000
1949	940,000
1950	938,000
1951	944,000
1952	946,000
1953	952,000
1954	951,000
1955	950,000
1956	928,251
1957	923,305
1958	926,514
1959	914,057
1960	918,950
1961	925,729
1962	931,802

Source: Joaquín Bardavío, La estructura del poder en España (Madrid, 1969), 117–18.

== See also ==
- Falange Española de las JONS
- Movimiento Nacional
- Unification Decree (Spain, 1937)
- Sección Femenina
- Frente de Juventudes
- Servicio Exterior de Falange
- Spanish transition to democracy
- Francoism
- National Catholicism
