= March of Oriamendi =

1837 hymn of the Carlist movement

Marcha de Oriamendi
English: March of Oriamendi
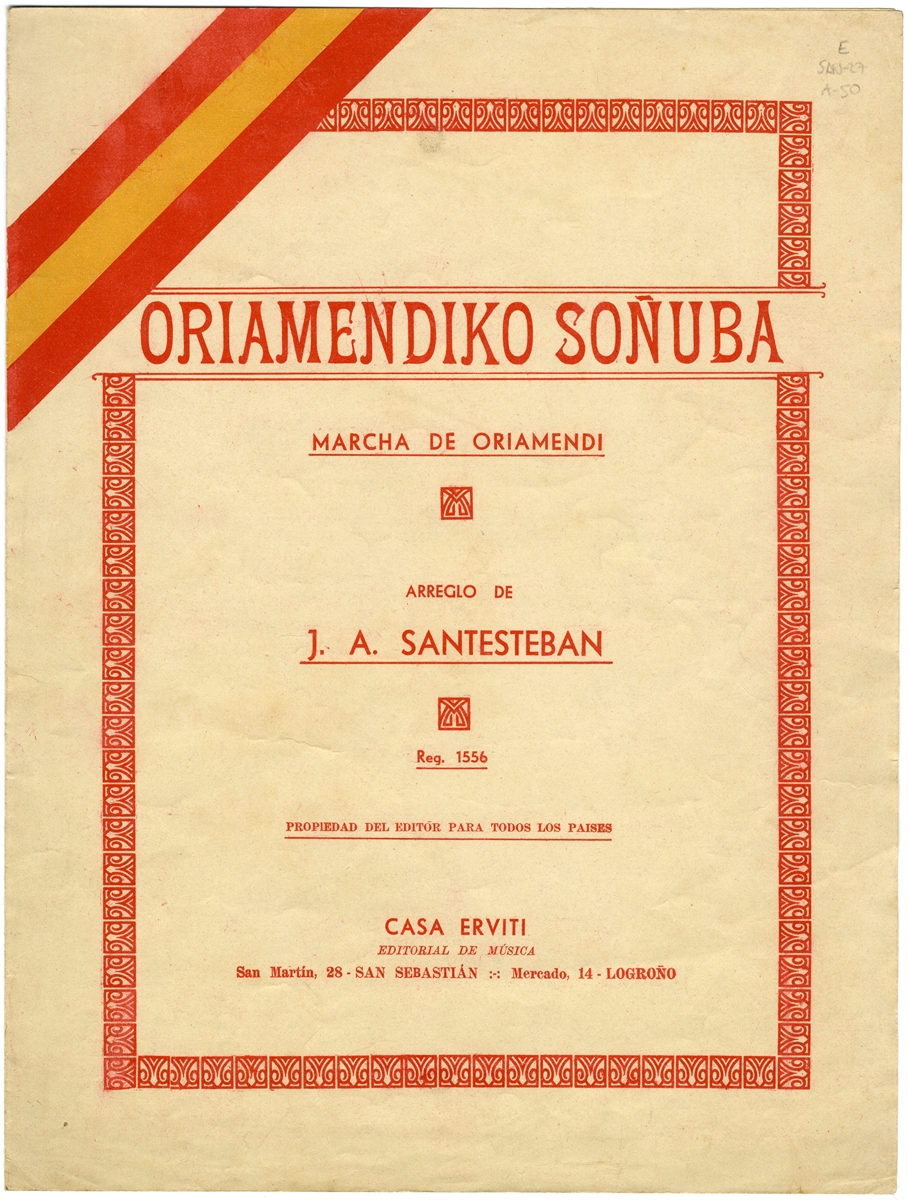
- Oriamendiko Soñuba
- Political anthem of Carlist Movement
- Lyrics: Ignacio Baleztena Ascárate, 1908
- Music: José Juan Santesteban

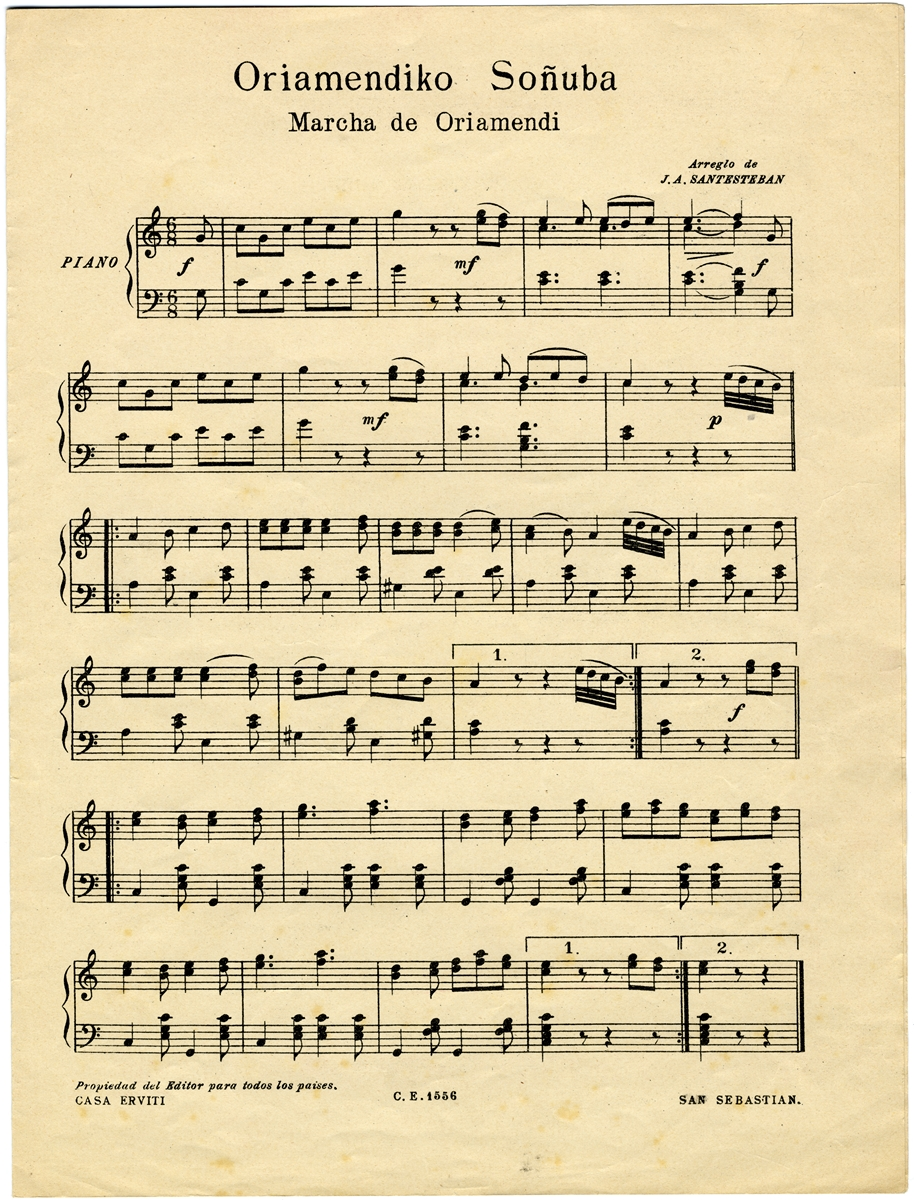
Partiture of the anthem.

March of Oriamendi (Spanish: Marcha de Oriamendi), is the anthem of the Carlist movement. The name of the anthem stems from the Battle of Oriamendi which took place in 1837 during the First Carlist War.

== History ==
It was composed by José Juan Santesteban to celebrate the Liberal victory. When the Carlists eventually won, they appropriated the melody.

The original lyrics were in Basque. The lyrics in Spanish were written in 1908 by Ignacio Baleztena Ascárate as Marcha Jaimista ("Jamesist March"). Over the years, several versions of "Oriamendi" have been in use. From 1936 to 1939, the line in the fourth verse, venga el Rey de España a la corte de Madrid, was replaced by que los boinas rojas entren en Madrid (the red berets shall conquer Madrid): los boinas rojas means the requetés, or Carlist soldiers. The red berets are part of the Carlist uniform.

The Decree 226/1937 of the Burgos Junta recognized as cantos nacionales the Marcha de Oriamendi, alongside the anthems of the Falange (Cara al Sol) and the Spanish Legion (Novio de la muerte), ordering that they should be listened to standing in homage to the Fatherland and the fallen. After the Civil War, a Francoist decree from 1942 reinstated the cantos nacionales, and ordered that, in official events, the playing of the anthem and the songs must be saluted with a "national salute" (Roman salute), or a military salute if the event is exclusively military.

== Lyrics ==
Marcha de Oriamendi

Por Dios, por la Patria y el Rey
Lucharon nuestros padres.
Por Dios, por la Patria y el Rey
Lucharemos nosotros también.

Lucharemos todos juntos
Todos juntos en unión
Defendiendo la bandera
De la Santa Tradición.(bis)

Cueste lo que cueste
Se ha de conseguir
Venga el Rey de España
A la corte de Madrid. (bis)

Por Dios, por la Patria y el Rey
Lucharon nuestros padres.
Por Dios, por la Patria y el Rey
Lucharemos nosotros también.

March of Oriamendi

For God, Fatherland and the King
Our forefathers fought.
For God, Fatherland and the King,
We will fight as well.

We shall fight, all together,
All together in union
Defending the banner
Of Sacred Tradition.(repeat)

At whatever cost,
Acquired it must be -
Return the King of Spain
To the court of Madrid. (repeat)

For God, Fatherland and the King
Our forefathers fought.
For God, Fatherland and the King
We will fight as well.

"God, Fatherland, King" (sometimes "God, Fatherland, Fuero, King") is the Carlist motto.

Montejurra (Basque Jurramendi) is another battle of symbolic importance to Carlists.

== Original lyrics ==
Oriamendiko Soñuba

Gora Jainko maite maitea
zagun denon jabe.
Gora España ta Euskalerria
ta bidezko errege.

Maite degu Euskalerria,
maite bere Fuero zarrak,
asmo ontara jarriz daude
beti Karlista indarrak.

Gora Jaungoiko illezkor!!!
Gora euskalduna,
audo ondo Españia-ko
errege bera duna!!!

Translation

Long live God most beloved
let him be our Lord.
Long live Spain and the Basque Land
and the legitimate king.

We love the Basque Land,
we love its Traditional Laws,
for this ideal fight
always the Carlist forces.

Long live God Immortal!
Long live the Basque,
who have the same
king as Spain!
