= Joan Maria Thomàs =

Spanish historian and writer

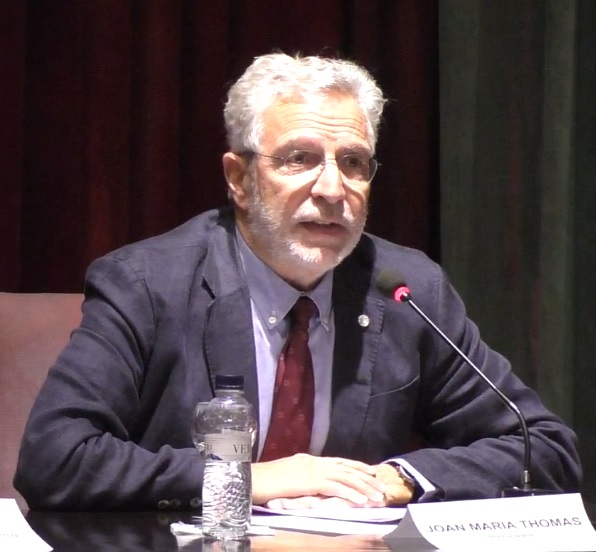
- Born: 1953; Palma de Mallorca
- Occupation: Historian, university teacher
- Employer: University of Rovira i Virgili
- Awards: Narcís Monturiol Medal (2015)

Joan Maria Thomàs Andreu (born 1953 in Palma) is a Spanish historian. He is professor of Contemporary History at the Rovira i Virgili University and corresponding member of the Royal Academy of History. His academic production has focused on the history of falangism and the international relations of Spain during the Francoist dictatorship.

== Works ==
- Falange, Guerra Civil, Franquisme. F.E.T. y de las JONS de Barcelona en els primers anys de règim franquista. 1992.
- Lo que fue la Falange. La falange y los falangistas de José Antonio, Hedilla y la Unificación. Franco y el fin de la Falange Española de las JONS. Plaza & Janés. 1999.
- La Falange de Franco: Fascismo y fascistización en el régimen franquista (1937–1945). Plaza & Janés. 2001.
- Roosevelt, Franco, and the End of the Second World War. Palgrave Macmillan. 2011.
- El Gran Golpe. El "caso Hedilla" o cómo Franco se quedó con Falange. Debate. 2014.
- Franquistas contra franquistas. Luchas por el poder en la cúpula del régimen de Franco. Debate. 2016.
- José Antonio. Realidad y mito. Debate. 2017. (Note: Published in English under the title José Antonio Primo de Rivera: The Reality and Myth of a Spanish Fascist Leader, translated by John Bates (Berghahn Books, 2019))
