= Women in 1930s Francoist Spain =

Women in 1930s Francoist Spain experienced major changes to marriage. Civil marriages that took place between 1932 and 1939 were annulled, and only if both partners were Roman Catholic were they permitted to remarry.

== Period overview ==
As a consequence of the Spanish Civil War, over a million Spaniards died, another million were forced into exile and an unknown number disappeared. Franco's regime would continue Civil War based reprisals until the end of World War II, with an estimated 200,000 people being executed by the regime or died in prison in that period for their alleged Republican links. Adolf Hitler provided support for Franco during the Spanish Civil War.

In the first days of the Francoist period, it was a crime for a woman to be mother, daughter, sister or wife of a "red", and this could be punished with long prison sentences or death.

Women were subjected to economic reprisals by the regime. In Galicia, around 14,600 people were victims of such reprisals. Former Republican A Gudiña mayor Florinda Ortega Pérez was one such victim. The government confiscated her business and all her property, along with fining her 10,000 pesetas. This bankrupted her and forced her into exile.

Eugenics in Spain in the late 1930s and through to the 1940s was not based on race, but instead on people's political alignment with the regime. Ricardo Campos said, "the racial question during the Franco era is complex." He went on to say, "despite the similarities of the Franco regime with the Italian and German fascism and the interest that the eugenics provoked, the strong Catholicism of the regime prevented its defense of the eugenic policies that were practiced in the Nazi Germany." Campos went on to say, "it was very difficult to racialize the Spanish population biologically because of the mixture that had been produced historically." Vallejo-Nágera in his 1937 work, "Eugenics of the Hispanicity and Regeneration of the Race" defined Hispanicness around spirituality and religion. The goal was the "strengthening psychologically" of the phenotype. Because Catholicism was opposed to negative eugenics, the only way to enforce eugenic policies was through repression of abortion, euthanasia and contraception.

Doctors in Francoist Spain had two roles: to be moral protectors of Spanish reproduction and to provide science based medical services. This put male doctors in charge of women's birth control. When medical doctors in the Second Republic and early Francoist period defended birth control, it was on the eugenics grounds that it protected the health of both women and children, especially as it curbed the spread of genetic disease and the spread of tuberculosis and sexually transmitted diseases.

=== Women in opposition to the regime ===
Most of the resistance in Spain during the early Franco period was done by guerrillas, who coordinated their activities with political militants in exile and with militants in prison. Most of Spain's militant women who remained in Spain were in prison or had gone underground where they served as important figures in coordinating resistance activities. Prisons in this case proved invaluable for many militant women as they allowed them to rebuild their activist networks or create new networks. They were also one of the biggest sources of female resistance to the Franco regime

POUM all but disappeared in Spain at the end of the Spanish Civil War, with PCE and PSOE being more successful at re-organizing. Women affiliated with POUM found themselves imprisoned following the end of the Spanish Civil War.

==== Partido Comunista de España ====
Partido Comunista de España became the dominant clandestine political organization in Spain following the end of the Civil War. It would retain this position until the death of Franco saw PSOE replace it. Women were involved with the party, helping to organize covert armed resistance by serving in leadership roles and assisting in linking political leaders in exile with those active on the ground in Spain. During the later parts of the war, some women from POUM were coerced into making false confessions in Moscow courtrooms, and then sent to Soviet prisons. Their major crime was being Trotskyites.

Rosa Estruch Espinós, Asunción Pérez Pérez, Amalia Estela Alama, Adelaida de la Cruz Ramón Tormo, Ángela Sempere and Remedios Montero were some of the communist women imprisoned during the Franco regime as a result of their involvement with the party during the Civil War.

==== Partido Socialista Obrero Español ====
PSOE continued to ignore the unique problems of women during the Civil War. When women were interested in joining the party, they found themselves locked out of leadership positions. PSOE also refused to send women to the front, perpetuating the sexist belief that a woman could best serve the war effort by staying at home.

PSOE was one of the only major actors on the left to immediately reject the idea of women participating in combat. The idea was too radical for them, and they believed women should serve as heroes at home, providing support to civilian populations well behind the front lines. Women who were members of PSOE who found their way to combat did so by joining communist and socialist youth groups. One of the few publicly socialist identified militia women in this period was María Elisa García, who served as a miliciana with the Popular Militias as a member Asturias Battalion Somoza company.

PSOE and UGT militant María Añó was involved in clandestine PSOE organizations, and would be sent to prison several times as a result of her political activities. PSOE and UGT militant Julia Vigre played a central role in organizing clandestine union and party activities. She went to prison several times as a result. Mujeres Antifascistas member and PSOE militant Josefa Lirola was detained dozens of times for her involvement in protesting the regime. Some women were executed because of their involvement with the party. María del Rey was executed by the regime because of her PSOE party membership.

=== Basque nationalism ===
During the Civil War, PNV was split in its position because nationalists views and Catholic orientation. Despite initial statements indicating support for the Second Republic, not every local section was willing to express support for armed resistance to Nationalist forces. Early on in cities like Guipúzcoa, the party tried to be neutral and mediate conflict between both sides. In cities like Vizcaya and Bilbao, PNV organized militias in support of Republicans.

The Basque Country in the early Franco period saw many people being subjected to mass arrest and imprisonment, along with many people being killed. The regime engaged in an active suppression of all nationalist expressions across Spain, impacting Basques, Catalans and others. National flags were prohibited. All languages but Spanish were banned. Basque cultural symbols were replaced by those of Spanish National Catholicism.

In the Basque Country, following the Spanish nationalists seizing control of the area, women found themselves being investigated by the new regime. In Biscay, over 300 different women were investigated in this period. Many were also imprisoned. They were subject to scrutiny because they were accused them of being involved with or having sympathies for groups like PCE, UGT, Partido Nacionalista Vasco (PNV), and Emakume Abertzaleen Batzak.

Starting at the end of the Spanish Civil War, Basque nationalists began to stockpile weaponry. They also began to train members in weapons use out of fear of the growing risk of illegal violence toward them by right wing actors. This accelerated during the 1940s as a result of World War II, when French Basques were active in their resistance to Nazi Germany.

== By year ==
=== 1936 ===
In July 1936, the Spanish Civil War started with a military coup attempt launched from the Spanish enclave of Melilla. In October of that same year, Franco took over as the Generalissimo and Chief of State in Nationalist zones.

By the start of the war in July 1936, Sección Femenina had 2,500 members nationwide organized into 18 different province based branches. The death of José Antonio Primo de Rivera at the hands of Republican forces in November 1936 left Pilar Primo de Rivera feeling empowered to carry on his work, claiming the need to finish what he had started. She took a firm hand to lead Sección Femenina during the Spanish Civil War. Pilar would continue to head the organization for another 43 years after its 1934 founding. While Pilar had been in Madrid when the war broke out and could not flee until October 1936, she moved to Salamanca where Nationalist coup supporters had proven more successful. Meanwhile, Sección Femenina established a provisional headquarters in Vallodolid. During the war, women affiliated with Sección Femenina spread propaganda, sewed flags, visited Falangist prisoners in jail, supported families of prisoners and engaged in large scale fundraising activities in support of nationalist causes. Sección Femenina trained instructors and health practitioners, and in the process developed a number of female leaders. The organization also created territorial based sub-entities to implement their wider agenda of controlling women across Spain.

UGT leader Francisco Largo Caballero served as Spain's Prime Minister from 1936 to 1937. UGT and PSOE were both banned by Franco in 1938.

By the mid-1936 and through to 1938, Spanish communist found itself in internal conflict between Stalinist and Trotskyites, with PCE lining up behind Stalin and POUM supporting Trotsky. The Russian backed Stalinist PCE started purging left-wing Trotskyites in the during the Civil War, culminating in the May Days of 1937 purges in Barcelona and the overthrow of Prime Minister Largo Caballero. POUM was damaged by these events, but did not disappear. Instead, members went into hiding until the end of the war and continued to publish La Batalla and Juventud Obrera.

During the Spanish Civil War, the autonomous Basque government avoided chaos in Biscay and western Gipuzkoa, and took the reins of the coordination and provision of military resistance. On occupation of the territories loyal to the Republic, the Francoist repression was focused on leftists, but Basque nationalists were also targeted, facing prison, humiliation, and death. As the rebel troops approached Biscay, the Carlist press in Pamplona even called for the extermination of Basque nationalists.

José Antonio Aguirre, the leader of the Basque Nationalist Party (PNV), became in October 1936 the first lendakari (Basque president) of the wartime multipartite Basque Government, ruling the unconquered parts of Biscay and Gipuzkoa.

=== 1937 ===
Starting in 1937, Franco started an attempt to purge the movement he created of its explicit fascist origins. Part of this process involved the Degree of Unification. Despite this, Franco never fully purged some fascist implements such as Sección Femenina who support state patriarchy, and joined the state with Catholicism.

On 19 April 1937, Catholic and Falangist parties were merged, making Falange Española Tradicionalista the official state party behind Nationalist lines. Sección Femenina held their first national conference in January 1937, which allowed for the organization for the first time to highlight their accomplishments with support from the nationalist Spanish state. By 1939, Sección Femenina had a membership of over 580,000 women nationwide.

The regime's relation to the Basque language and Basque nationalism has three periods. The first was from the fall of Bilbao in 1937 to the mid-1950s, and it involved active suppression. In April 1937, the city of Guernica was bombed by German airplanes. Jose Antonio de Aguirre stated that "the German planes bombed us with a brutality that had never been seen before for two and a half hours." Pablo Picasso made a painting in remembrance of the massacre named after the city that year.

==== Women in CNT in 1937 ====
In the Canary Islands in January 1937, women, including pregnant women, affiliated with the Confederación Nacional del Trabajo as either members or family members of members were arrested, imprisoned and sometimes executed. For CNT connected women who gave birth in Canary Islands in the Civil War period, Nationalist forces would sometimes take their children to civil registries and officially change the names of their children.

==== Women in UGT in 1937 ====
In November 1937, María Lacrampe became the secretary of the Asociación Socialista de Madrid. As part of her work, she assisted in bringing Spanish Republican children into exile in Belgium. Claudina García Perez served as a member of UGT's executive committee from October 1937 to April 1939. Aragón UGT militant María Elisa García Saez was killed in combat in the mountains of Múgica on 9 May 1937.

=== 1938 ===
On 30 January 1938, the first National State Cabinet meeting was held, with the Spanish Civil War formally coming to an end on 1 April 1939 and an official government formalized on 8 August 1939. During the Civil War, from his seat of government in Burgos, Franco issued a declaration in April 1938 that promised pensions to widows and orphans of Nationalist forces captured by Republicans. His regime extended these benefits in December 1940 to widows and orphans of all nationalist troops and Nationalist supporters killed by Republicans. This was further extended in July 1941 to any Nationalist civil servants killed during the war. In December 1931, these pensions were extended to the parents of priests killed during the war.

The policy of the Franco regime with regard to women was a huge setback for the Republic as it set out to impose the traditional Catholic family model based on the total subordination of the wife to her husband and reduce them back to the domestic sphere as it had been proclaimed in the Labor Charter of 1938 in order "to free the married woman from the workshop and from the factory. " This hindered women's access to education and vocational and professional life and abolished or restricted their rights both in the public and in private. One example involved Franco returning to the Civil Code of 1889 and the former Law Procedure Criminal, which they sanctioned the legal inferiority of women.

Dr. Luque was quoted in the SF magazine Y in 1938 as saying, "In the state, the woman/mother has to be the most important citizen. Those are the words that Hitler said in his fundamental program. Because we know he is totally right, and because we are aware of the importance of getting as many healthy children from healthy mothers as we can for our country at this moment, we have to make this statement come true, not only in words but in action." In 1938, Franco told the United Press, "The criminals and their victims can not live together."

March 1938, Franco suppressed the laws regarding civil matrimony and divorce that had been enacted by the Second Republic. On 2 March 1938, Franco declared that in all Nationalist territories that lawsuits seeking legal separation or divorce were to be suspended.

==== Women in the PNV in 1938 ====
Basque PNV women in exile in Argentina created a branch of the organization on 16 August 1938 called Acción Nacionalista Vasca. Women involved in the initial organizing of the group included Amelia Arteche de Jáuregui, Amelia G. De Menchaca, María Begoña de Orbea como Tesorera y Angelita de Bilbao, Arantzazu de Barrena, Ikerne de Kortazar, Antonia de Amorrortu and Miren de Muxika. Their goal was to keep Basque culture and language alive among exiles in the country. Emakume Abertzale Batza members who remained in the Basque Country helped Basque nationalist prisoners, shared books in Euskara, and organized ikastolas. They also worked to encourage mixed language and mixed-gender education in public schools.

==== Women in the UGT and PSOE in 1938 ====
The UGT and PSOE were both banned by Franco in 1938. Women who were affiliated with UGT were disappeared during the early Francoist period.

=== 1939 ===
The Spanish Civil War ended in April 1939 following the final collapse of Republican forces.

Following Franco's victory over the forces of the Second Republic, his government ruled militarily as if they were an occupying force. Consequently, this resulted in many people inside Spain feeling alien inside their own land. Franco supported this attitude, saying on 3 April 1939, "Spaniards, alert, peace is not a comfortable and cowardly repose against history. The blood of those who fell for the Homeland does not allow for forgetfulness, sterility or betrayal Spanish. Be alert. Spain is still at war against all enemies from within or from abroad."

On 22 April 1939, an order was made that all canonical marriages carried out by the Republic be registered as such with the Francoist government.

The castillo de la Mota in Medina del Campo was the center of the Escuela Superior de Formación de la Sección Femenina in the Francoist period. Inside, women and teenaged girls were trained to become Falangist leaders in defense of the Spanish family. Lessons were given on hygiene, embroidery, cooking, singing of patriotic hymns, and saying of prayers. In May 1939, Pilar Primo de Rivera organized a festival at La Mota castle in Medina del Campo which was attended by 10,000 girls and young women. With Franco in attendance, Pilar asked that the castle be used as the seat of Sección Femenina and reforms were then started later that year to repurpose it for the organization's needs.

By April 1939 when the Spanish Civil War concluded, Franco had forcibly made the Basque Country and Basque culture part of the "great household" of a united Spain. Franco repealed the 1932 Divorce Law of the Second Republic on 23 September 1939. The 23 September 1939 law said that women who requested and received divorces as a result of allegations of mistreatment, the husband could force the wife to remarry. In all cases, the divorce request would automatically be annulled if one party asked for the marriage to be reconstituted. They had to only state a "desire to reconstitute their legitimate home, or simply, to reassure their conscience as believers." In cases where both former spouses wished to remain divorced, neither could remarry until one of them died. Marriages that had taken place civilly between 1932 and 1939 were annulled: Couples were forced to remarry, and could only do so if both partners were Catholics.

During 1939, conditions in prison for children of mothers imprisoned for political offenses were awful. In Las Ventas prison, an average of eight children died a day as a result of lack of food an unhygienic conditions.

==== Women in PSOE and UGT in 1939 ====
Claudina García Perez served as a member of the UGT executive committee from October 1937 to April 1939. By May 1939, when the Spanish Civil War was officially over, García Perez was in Las Ventas Prison in Madrid. The case against her was dismissed in 1940, and she was released from prison. Dulcenombre del Moral was married to a prominent Andalusian socialist, Ventura Castelló, and arrested in July 1936 to try to lure him out of hiding. She would stay in prison until her release in 1939. By that time, she had replaced her husband within PSOE and would be arrested multiple times more including in 1941, 1942 and 1944.

PSOE and UGT militant Ángeles García Ortega was sent to prison for three years in 1939. PSOE and UGT militant Pilar Pascual was arrested in March 1939 in Yecla for writing an article about socialism. Sentenced to death, she would spend time in prison in Yelca, Murcia and Las Ventas in Madrid after her conviction was commuted. After leaving prison, she rejoined PSOE and was active with the organization until she died.

At the conclusion of the war, María Lacrampe unsuccessfully tried to escape via boat by claiming she was a French citizen. By June 1939, she was in the Las Ventas Prison in Madrid, where she used her time to work as a nurse assisting children of other female prisoners. She would also be present right before many women were put to death, with many of these women offering her their last testimonies.

Because of her political involvement, Dolores Bañares Villanueva went to Las Ventas Prison in Madrid on 28 April 1939, where a court martial on 12 June 1940 gave the 39-year-old a twelve-year prison sentence. She was released from an Avila prison on 9 January 1941.

Ángeles Malonda was one of the UGT women imprisoned during the Franco regime as a result of her involvement with the union during the Civil War. PSOE and UGT militant María Añó was involved in clandestine PSOE organizations, and would be sent to prison several times as a result of her political activities. By May 1939, when the Spanish Civil War was officially over, Claudina García Perez was in Las Ventas Prison in Madrid. The case against her was dismissed in 1940, and she was released from prison.
