= Husband (disambiguation) =

A husband is a male participant in a marriage.

Husband may also refer to:

== Arts and entertainment ==
- The Husband (novel), an American novel
- The Husband (film), a Canadian comedy
- The Husband (TV series), a South Korean romantic thriller
- Husbands (film), an American drama
- Husbands (TV series), an American sitcom
- Husbands: The Comic, a digital comic book series
- Husbands, an Indian Malayalam-language comedy film series
- "Husband", a song by ¥$ from Vultures 2

== People ==
- Husband (surname), a list of people
- Husbands (surname), a list of people
- Husband E. Kimmel (1882–1968), admiral and commander in chief of the US Pacific Fleet during the 1941 attack on Pearl Harbor

== Places ==
- Husband, Pennsylvania, a community in the United States
- Husbands, Barbados, a populated place
- Husband Hill, on Mars
- Husband, a lunar crater inside Apollo (crater)

== See also ==
- Husband pillow, a type of pillow
- The Husbands (disambiguation)
- Husbando
