= Women's rights in Francoist Spain and the democratic transition =

Women rights in Francoist Spain (1939–1975) and the democratic transition (1975–1985) were limited. The Franco regime immediately implemented draconian measures that legally incapacitated women, making them dependents of their husbands, fathers or the state. Moderate reforms would not begin until the 1960s, with more dramatic reforms taking place after Franco's death in 1975 and the ensuing democratic transition.

Freedom of association was a right denied to women. Franco banned all trade unions and political parties after coming to power in 1938. Women's groups and feminist organizations only began to emerge in the 1960s, with more freedom of association allowed in 1964. Real change would not happen until 1978 when the law changed to allow feminist associations to lawfully exist. Unions were allowed to be lawfully created one year earlier, in 1977. Censorship existed during the Franco regime, and impacted both the depiction of women in the media and what women writers could produce. There were ways around it, but censorship still negatively impacted much of the work of earlier Spanish women and feminists. Women's employment opportunities in the Francoist period were severely limited. Women needed the permission of male guardians to work, and there were many jobs they were legally barred from. Legal reforms around this system only started to take place in the 1960s as a result of economic needs.

Women and feminists watched with great interest the process of creating a new Spanish constitution. Despite being a heavily repressed group during the regime, they were completely excluded from the process. Decisions around women's rights were ignored, used for political capital or pushed down the road to be dealt with later. Only in the final part of the process was one woman involved. She was UCD's María Teresa Revilla. In 1981, Soledad Becerril became a minister in the Spanish government. She was the first woman minister in Spain since the Second Spanish Republic.

== History ==
The pillars for a New Spain in the Franco era became national syndicalism and national Catholicism. The Franco period saw an extreme regression in the rights of women. The situation for women was more regressive than that of women in Nazi Germany under Hitler. Women did not have rights in Francoist Spain. Women had civil obligations, where not being a responsible was a considered a crime. Many of the laws imposed by the regime had roots in nineteenth century Spanish laws, and treated women as if their sex was a disability. The legal status for women in many cases reverted to that stipulated in the Napoleonic Code that had first been installed in Spanish law in 1889. The post Civil War period saw the return of laws that effectively made wards of women. They were dependent on husbands, fathers and brothers to work outside the house. Women needed permission to do an array of basic activities, including applying for a job, opening a bank account or going on a trip. The law during the Franco period allowed husbands to kill their wives if they caught them in the act of adultery. All legislation passed in Spain between 1936 and 1941 that was not decreed by Franco was repealed in 1941.

Pilar Primo de Rivera was viewed by many inside the regime as a critical player in successfully encouraging Franco to relax restrictions for women during the 1950s and 1960s. In 1969 at the Federación Internacional de Mujeres de Carreras Jurídicas conference, María Telo Núñez in Madrid presented a paper on the rights of women under Spain's civil code. This presentation would inspire the creation in 1971 of the Asociación Española de Mujeres Juristas. The groups's goal was to reform family law, which was done with the changes on 2 May 1975.

The intention to organize the International Year of Women was announced by the United Nations in 1972. Sección Feminina then launched a political campaign to be the point organization for United Nation plans around women. Absent any other organization capable of doing this, the government agreed and published their decision in Decreto 950/1974. The regime followed this with statements about plans to reform or eliminate laws that incapacitated women.

In dealing with the evolving problems of women, President of Government Arias Navarro said in 1974 ahead of the International Year of the Woman, that Spain needed a "genuine and profitable Spanish feminism", a feminism that had Spanish origins and was free of foreign influence. It should not come from "communities of traditions well differentiated to ours or that are in a very different state of development." Navarro was likely indicating support for Sección Femenina, and not for other qualified Spanish feminists of the period like Mercedes Formica and Maria Angeles Durán. Ahead of the Year of the Woman, the government created eight commissions to investigate the status of Spanish women. They were, "The International Year of Women in the United Nations and in organizations international "; "Analysis of the situation of the maladjusted and marginalized woman"; "Women and social welfare"; "Women and work"; "Women in education and in culture "; "Women in socio-economic development"; "The woman and the family"; and" Women in the civic-social and political community". The government used reports from these commissions to produce two reports that were published in 1975. They were La situación de la mujer en España and Memoria del Año Internacional de la Mujer. Lawyer María Telo played an important role in the legal easing of restrictions for women in May 1975. The regime allowed the lifting of restrictions as part of its attempts to change its international image in light of the 1975 UN International Year of Women.

While moderate reforms had taken place up before Franco's death, at the time of his death women still lacked a number of rights. This included the ability to get a job without permission of a woman's father or husband, to open her own bank account, to own property in her own name without permission from her father or husband, get a passport without permission or to travel without permission.

In the immediate post-Franco era, feminists were successful in decriminalizing adultery, divorce, abortion before three months, and some forms of birth control. The treatment of women's rights in the democratic transition put Spain in line with other European governments of the period. European influence was a positive one in Spain in this period in terms of making sure the discussion about women's rights took place.

== Association ==
The Franco regime banned all political parties and trade unions by 1938. The only permissible type organization was Falange, founded by José Antonio Primo de Rivera in 1933. This ban included both UGT and PSOE.

The 1959 Law of Public Order was created to prevent people from protesting by punishing organizers financially for organizing them. Fines could be given up to 500,000 pesetas for holding unauthorized protests. The law had a chilling effect on those seeking to express opposition to the regime. As a result of this law, the Court of Public Order (TOP) would be created in December 1963 with the intention of punishing any person or association that disturbed public order. This included work stoppages and strikes, and any attempts to block public roads, or anyone disobeying public officials telling crowds to disperse. Sanctions could be levied by mayors, civil governors, the Minister of the Interior and the Council of Ministers. Fines could be increased by 50% if alleged participants had a police or criminal record. Trade unions were officially not allowed in Francoist Spain with the nominal exception of the Falange led union organization Organización Sindical Española (OSE). Women tended not to be involved with them. When they did though, Falangist women would often find themselves working alongside socialist and communist women and would serve as a focused source of opposition to the regime.

Starting in the 1960s, women's groups and feminists organizations began to emerge. These included university groups, women's jurist associations and clandestine women's political affiliate organizations. Women's associations were tolerated by the regime but were not completely legal. This changed when in 1964, women's associations were legally allowed. Feminists associations were legally allowed starting in 1978, a year after PCE began a legal political party. In 1974 and 1975, there were no full women's associations as the government required they have more than 19 members, and the Catholic Church was still involved in trying to discourage the official recognition of such associations. The Democratic Movement of Women in Catalonia first met in 1963. They held their First General Meeting of the Democratic Movement in 1965, bringing together women from around Spanish to constitute the Women's Democratic Movement. While the Catalan organization disappeared in 1969, it continued on mostly in Madrid, Galicia and Valencia. Partido Feminista would not become legal until 1981. They had been legally constituted in 1979, but had lacked legal government recognition as a political party until two years later.

Franco's death in 1975 allowed women to emerge publicly, no longer needing to remain clandestine. It led to the mass organization of feminist organizations.

The political reform undertaken by the president of the government Adolfo Suárez included the approval of the freedom of union association: this in practice supposed the death of the Francoist Trade Unions. Paradoxically, Adolfo Suárez had been Minister-Secretary General of the Movement until his new appointment. On 8 October 1976, the Suárez government approved the creation of the Institutional Administration of Socioprofessional Services (ISSA), an autonomous body dependent on the government's presidency in which the union structure was integrated. ISSA took over the ownership and management of OSE's s real estate assets and all its archives. On 1 April 1977, the right of association was finally recognized, and a Royal Decree of June 2 of that same year extinguished the mandatory union membership.

== Censorship ==
Censorship examples

Attention censors! All photographs on sports championships Women 's Section, where the comrades are teaching knees are prohibited and therefore must be struck.

Ads concerning the sale of photographs of Rita Hayworth in the movie Gilda are strictly prohibited . Please take the necessary measures so that no announcement appears in the indicated newspapers of your jurisdiction.

Censorship became a new reality for many women writers in Francoist Spain. Publishers were subject to government control. The Catholic Church was highly influential in what was allowed to be published. Depictions of women were censored by the media in Francoist Spain. Suicide, abortion, nudity, drug use, and alcohol and alcoholism were often considered taboo subjects that would warrant censorship by the regime. Starting in 1962, censorship across Spain began to officially relax. Further changes to relax censorship occurred four years later in 1966.

One of the ways to journalists would get around censorship was to avoid direct criticism of Franco and the military. Scholars such as Michael Ugarte suggest that censorship may have been advantageous to some writers, as it required the "sharpening of the writer's traditional tools: irony, allusion, ambiguity, association, multiple signification and other devices that enhance the sophistication of the writing and the reader's reception of it."

Children's magazines and women's magazines were heavily censored by the Franco regime. Authors who faced censorship included foreign writers like Nadine Gordimer, Margarite Duras, Doris Lessing, Dacia Maraini, Mary McCarthy, Carson McCullers, Nathalie Sarraute and Mary Wollstonecraft. The writings of Frederica Montseny and Dolores Ibárruri were particularly a target of censors, with the regime also targeting both women who had fled abroad for their own safety. Despite her leftist leanings, Carmen Conde took care to try to represent all the victims of the Spanish Civil War in the 1967 Spanish language edition of Mientras los hombres mueren in Obra poética so as to avoid to potential that the government would censor her work.

Despite lifting of censorship, many translated texts continued to contain censored versions well into the 2010s. This includes Grace Kelly and Clark Gable's 1953 film Mogambo. In its Spanish dubbed release had a husband and wife replaced with two brothers to avoid representing adultery in the film. Whole parts of the film were also removed. This censorship still exists in Spanish dubbed versions.

== Employment ==
The policy of the Franco regime with regard to women was a huge setback for the Republic as it set out to impose the traditional Catholic family model based on the total subordination of the wife to her husband and reduce them back to the domestic sphere as it had been proclaimed in the Labor Charter of 1938 in order "to free the married woman from the workshop and from the factory. " This hindered women's access to education and vocational and professional life and abolished or restricted their rights both in the public and in private. One example involved Franco returning to the Civil Code of 1889 and the former Law Procedure Criminal, which they sanctioned the legal inferiority of women.

In the 1940s, women were barred from a number of professions. These included being a magistrate, diplomat, notary, customs officer, stock broker, and prison doctor. This was because women's primary job was to be a homemaker. Numerous obstacles were placed on the work of women, especially married women, and restrictions were placed on their registration in the placement registers and the husband's authorization to be hired. In addition, numerous labor ordinances stipulated that the woman as soon as she got married had to leave her job, being compensated with a dowry. A so-called "plus family" function, established in 1945, served as a financial aid whose purpose was "to strengthen the family and its Christian tradition, the perfect society and the foundation of the Nation." In addition, the access of women to a large part of the bodies of the public administration, especially to superiors, was prevented by law as a lawyer of the State, judge, prosecutor, diplomat, property registrar, notary, labor inspector, exchange agent and stock exchange, etc.

Discrimination in employment was banned based on gender in 1961, with exceptions for the judiciary, armed forces and merchant navy. Reforms also meant that women were legally guaranteed the same wage as their male counterparts. This was done with the 22 July 1961 Ley sobre Derechos Políticos, Profesionales y de Trabajo. A 1963 legal reform meant employers could no longer dismiss women because they were married. The law still required women to have a husband's permission before starting work though.

== 1978 Spanish constitution and democratic transition ==
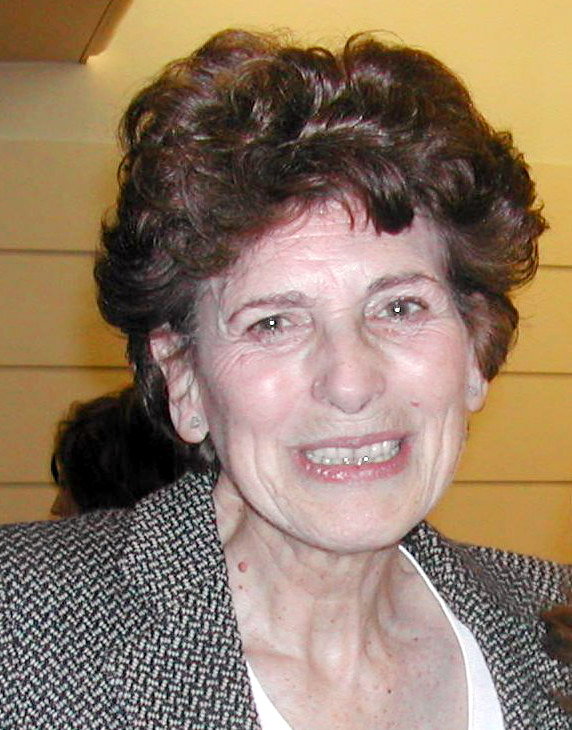
Teresa Revilla in January 2006

Franco died in 1975. This was followed by a transition period, which included the creation of the 1978 Spanish Constitution that still governs Spain. Following Franco's death, Spain underwent massive change that culminated in the Constitution of 1978. This document returned Spain to being a country where women were guaranteed full equal rights under the law. Reforms in the post-Francoist period saw the Catholic Church lose official status in government, the age of legal majority moved from 21 to 18, and marriage defining men and women equally. Under Article 14 of the 1978 Spanish Constitution, all people were considered equal before the law. It prohibited the state from discriminating based on birth, sex, religion or political opinion. Article 9.2 states, "It is the responsibility of public powers to promote conditions ensuring that the freedom and equality of individuals and of the groups to which they belong are real and effective."

Feminists largely rejected the 15 December 1976 Political Reform Referendum. In general, they did not believe the Francoists were capable of enacting reforms that would benefit women. In the Constituent Assembly that drafted the 1978 Spanish constitution, only 27 members were women. The final drawing up of the Spanish constitution had no women involved in the process. The only woman involved in the 39-member commission that debated the constitutional process was UGT's María Teresa Revilla. Revilla said of the process, "The Constitution was a fundamental and decisive leap for women in Spain. From there, the inequalities in the laws began to be corrected. The woman really began to be able to be what she herself achieved with her effort (...) I believe that none of the deputies of that constituent legislature were satisfied with the regulation of the Crown in regard to the order of succession. How was it then possible to discriminate against women in flagrant contradiction with what was said in article 14 of the Constitution itself? Even today I can not find sufficient reason."

The Cortes of 1977 had to try to find a way to navigate the demands of the newly liberated left, who wanted to see reforms like the legalization of abortion and divorce, with the Catholic Church who opposed both. The last time the state had been in conflict with the Church was in 1931, with the founding of the Second Republic and no one wanted to see renewed political violence.

On 22 May 1978, four UCD deputies and four Socialist deputies met at a restaurant in Madrid to try to find a compromise on major issues as they related to how they were addressed in the constitution. These issues included divorce and abortion. The UCD deputies went into the meeting having consulted their PCE and Catalan counterparts and gotten their approval for these talks. All agreed this was a necessary step to avoid a breakdown in the process of writing a new constitution. Allianz Popular was left out of these discussions. One of the reasons UCD went into decline after the 1977 elections was the party was forced to take positions on major issues of the day, including divorce, abortion and the use of public money for private schools.

In the first draft of the constitution, both PSOE and PCE supported the legalization of abortion and divorce. UCD supported the legalization of divorce, but at a later date. UCD opposed the legalization of abortion. Coalición Popular opposed both the legalization of abortion and divorce. A compromise was reached on divorce that would see the issue addressed in later legislation through the text of Article 32.2 which said, "the law will regulate the forms of matrimony... [and] the causes of separation and dissolution." No agreement could be reached over abortion, and Article 15 had the ambiguous text "todos tienan derecho a la vida" at the insistence of UCD and Coalición Popular so the door could be left open to make abortion illegal.

Feminists groups watched the process of creating a new Spanish constitution with concern. On 6 December 1978, a number of groups presented Cortes president Antonio Hernández Gil with a list of their concerns about it. Signatories included women who were members of UCD, PSOE, PC, MDM, ADM-PT and ORT-ULM. They wanted the constitution to commit the government to incorporating women into the workforce, that marriage should be based on equality of spouses, that marriages could be dissolved by mutual consent of either spouse, that every women should have the right to decide how many children she would have, and that women should have access to birth control. These women were opposed to Article 15, which said that "everyone has the right to life" (Spanish: todos tienen derecho a la vida) as they felt it could be interpreted as offering protection to fetuses. Their fears would be realized on 11 April 1985, when this constitutional wording was used to declare an abortion law illegal.

The Basque Nationalist Party objected to the new Spanish constitution of 1978 on the grounds it was a Spanish constitution. In 1981, Soledad Becerril became a minister in the Spanish government. She was the first woman minister in Spain since the Second Spanish Republic.
