= Women on the Nationalist side of the Spanish Civil War =

Women on the Nationalist side of the Spanish Civil War came from a culture and historical background that traditionally saw the role of women being defined by the Catholic Church. Prior to the founding of the Second Republic, women had few rights and were often under the control of their fathers or husbands. Their role in the state was to be a good mother, and the framework of the state supported that. They had few employment opportunities, were largely illiterate and their children often died during childbirth. Political activism was often based around Catholic organized women's groups. The Dictatorship of Primo de Rivera saw women enlisted on electoral rolls for the first time, as well as being allowed to run for municipal political office and appointed to the national congress by 1927.

The birth of the Second Republic in 1931 saw the rights of women expand, including the granting of the right to vote. Many on the left opposed this, believing women would support right-wing candidates as they remained under the influence of the Catholic Church and their husbands. The period of the Second Republic also saw the creation of Sección Femenina de la Falange Española, the only important Nationalist political organization for women in this period.

The Spanish Civil War started in July 1936. The treatment of women and children behind the lines was used by all sides as a way of trying to garner support for their sides in the Civil War both internally and internationally. Internally, Nationalist forces often had few problems killing women or using them as shields to try to attack Republican forces. Falangist women activists at times had difficulty in deciding whether they should to be in the public eye serving the cause or stay working in the home to serve Nationalist interests away from the front. Catholic women activists faced similar conflicts. The issue was mirrored in broader Nationalist society, which faced the need for women to fill support roles to help the war effort, while at the same time wanting women to remain pure, supporting traditional motherhood and working in the home. The concept of motherhood would also change fundamentally during the war, with mothers becoming the one in charge of the home. This idea would carry over into post-Francoist motherhood.

The end of the Civil War, and the victory of fascist forces, saw the return of traditional gender roles. This meant a return to gender norms of the past, except where economic needs required the presence of women in the workforce. Sección Femenina shaped the definition of Francoist womanhood, in state-sponsored Christian feminism. Nationalist women won benefits through motherhood, while women who supported Republicanism in this period often had their children stolen from them. Limited amounts of feminist beliefs were sanctioned by Francoist Spain, with much of the independently published material coming from aristocratic women.

== Background (1800–1922) ==
=== Women's rights ===
Spanish women did not hold the same status as citizens as men from 1800 to 1931. Single Spanish women enjoyed a few more legal rights than their married peers once they reached the age of 23. At that point, unmarried women could sign contracts and run businesses on their own behalf. Married women needed the approval or involvement of their husbands to handle matters such as changing their address, accepting an inheritance, or owning property or a business. All women in this period were denied the right to vote or run for political office. While it was legal for men to commit adultery so long as it was not "scandalous", all forms of adultery were illegal for women and they could be imprisoned for two to six years for the offense. Divorce was also banned. Catholicism played a huge role in Spanish political thinking in the nineteenth and early twentieth century Spain. The religion supported strict gender roles, which led to the repression of Spanish women and fostered ingrained sexism across the whole of Spanish society. Society, through the Catholic Church, dictated that the role of women was to marry, and bear children. They were to be invisible in society outside the domestic sphere. Violations of these norms was often met with violence. Families could force women into marriage against their will. Husbands could put their wives into prison for disobeying them or insulting them.

=== Political activity ===
The year 1919 marked the first time that attempts were made to mobilize conservative women in Spain, with the Acción Católica de la Mujer (ACM). Following its creation, women were involved in efforts to defy the government when it came to laws that challenged the supremacy of Catholicism in Spain.

=== Employment and labor organizations ===
While 17% of women worked in 1877, most were peasants who were involved in agriculture. Despite industrialization in Spain and because of the industrialization of agriculture in the 1900s, restrictive gender norms meant only 9% of women were employed by 1930. This represented a drop of 12% of all women and 0.5 million total women in the workforce from 1877 to 1930. Prostitution was legal in pre-Second Republic Spain, and poor, white women had to fear being trafficked as slaved. By the 1900s, women could and did sometimes work in factory sweatshops, alongside young male workers. Most women seeking employment outside their own homes worked in the homes of the more affluent in the country. These jobs paid so little that female workers often struggled to earn enough to feed themselves. When women were involved in factory work in this period, they were often paid half the wage of their male counterparts. Despite the limited opportunities for women, some did manage to get highly ranked government positions, though these were few and far between.

=== Education ===
The cultural situation in Spain resulted in a largely uneducated female population, with the literary rate for women only at 10% in 1900. The number of women known to have university titles in the period between 1800 and 1910 was around one, with María Goyri being the exception among Spanish women. When education was offered to women, it was with the goal of improving their performance in their domestic roles. This began to slowly change, with the literacy rate for women being 62% by 1930 and the gender ratio in schools being close to 50/50 on the primary school level. This did not carry over to universities, where only 4.2% of students were women in 1928.

=== Childbirth ===
Infant mortality rates were very high in the late 1800s and early 1900s, and many children in Spain were born out of wedlock.

== Dictatorship of Primo de Rivera (1923-1930) ==
=== Employment and labor organizations ===
40% of all Spanish working women in 1930 worked in domestic roles, representing the largest single industry for which women were present. Despite Primo de Rivera's view about the role of women, women were still able at times to have high ranking places in Spanish bureaucracy.

=== Political activity and government participation ===
Spain's right was divided into several factions, including Alfonsine monarchists, Carlists and Falangists. It also included political parties like Confederación Española de Derechas Autónomas (CEDA), Partido Republicano Radical (PRR), Derecha Liberal Republicana (DLR) and Lliga Catalana (LC). None of these had notable women's branches. Most of the political activity from right leaning women came from Catholic women's groups, which public activity around unnerved conservative institutions because of problem of duality of these women seeking to protect the role of conservative women in the home while being highly visible in activist roles outside of it. In 1928, ACM membership was at its peak with 119,000 thousand women members.

The 8 March 1924 Royal Decree's Municipal Statue Article 51 for the first time included an appendix which would allow electoral authorities on a municipal level to list women over the age of 23 who were not controlled by male guardians or the state to be counted. Article 84.3 said women could vote in municipal elections assuming they were the head of household, over the age of 23, and their state did not change. Changes were made the following month that allowed women who met those some qualifications to run for political office. Consequently, some women took advantage of this political opening, ran for office and won some seats in municipal governments as councilors and mayors.

Women would gain access to national representation during the 1927 - 1929 legislative period as a result of the Royal Decree Law of 12 September 1927, Article 15. This law stated, "to it may belong, indistinctly, males and females, single, widowed or married, these duly authorized by their husbands and as long as they do not belong to the Assembly [...]. Its designation will be made nominally and of Royal order of the Presidency, agreed in the Council of Ministers before October 6 next."

The 1927 - 1929 session also began the process of drafting a new Spanish constitution that would have fully franchised women voters in Article 55. The article was not approved. Despite this, women were eligible to serve in the national assembly in the Congreso de los Diputados, and fifteen women were appointed to seats on 10 October 1927. Thirteen were members part of the National Life Activities Representatives (Spanish: Representantes de Actividades de la Vida Nacional). Another two were State Representatives (Spanish: Representantes del Estado). These women included María de Maeztu, Micaela Díaz Rabaneda and Concepción Loring Heredia. During the Congreso de los Diputados's inaugural session in 1927, the President of the Assembly specifically welcomed the new women, claiming the exclusion of them had been unjust.

Loring Heredia would interrupt and demand an explanation from the Minister of Public Instruction and Fine Arts on 23 November 1927, marking the first time a woman had done this on the floor of Congress.

=== Daily life for women ===
In the days of the pre-Republic period and dictatorship, women on the streets of major cities like Barcelona and Madrid were often subjected to street harassment.

== Second Spanish Republic (1931 - 1937) ==
=== Elections in the Second Republic ===
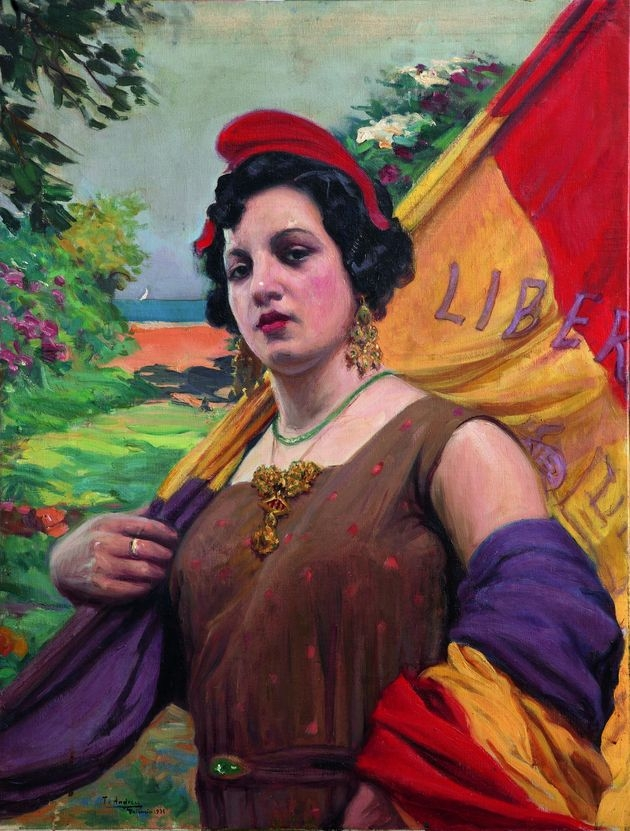
"República Española" (1931) by painter Teodoro Andreu.

The Second Republic had three elections. They were held in 1931, 1933 and 1936.

==== 1931 elections ====
The first women to win seats in Spain's Cortes were Clara Campoamor Rodríguez, Victoria Kent Siano and Margarita Nelken y Mansbergen following the June 1931 elections, when women still did not have the right to vote. Campoamor, a centrist viewed by some of her colleagues as right leaning, had created the Female Republican Union during the early part of the Second Republic. Female Republican Union had the sole purpose of advocating for women's suffrage, and did not support adding more rights beyond that. Campoamor and Kent had both been waged highly public battles during the writing of the constitution of the Second Republic over the rights of women, and over the issue of universal suffrage. This battle would largely continue during the first term of Spain's Congreso de los Diputados.

Campoamor, in arguing for women's suffrage before the Cortes on 1 October 1931, that women were not being given the right to vote as a prize, but as a reward for fighting for the Republic. Women protested the war in Morocco. Women in Zaragoza protested the war in Cuba. Women went in larger numbers to protest the closer of Ateneo de Madrid by the government of Primo de Rivera.

Kent, in contrast, received much more support from Spain's right, including Catholics and traditionalists, during this period of constitutional debate as she, alongside Nelken, opposed women's suffrage. Kent believed women would vote as their husbands and the Roman Catholic Church dictated, and that women, with a 90% illiteracy rate, would not be able to make informed voting decisions on their own. Kent and Campoamor became involved in a grand debate over the issue, receiving large amounts of press related to their arguments.

==== 1933 Elections ====
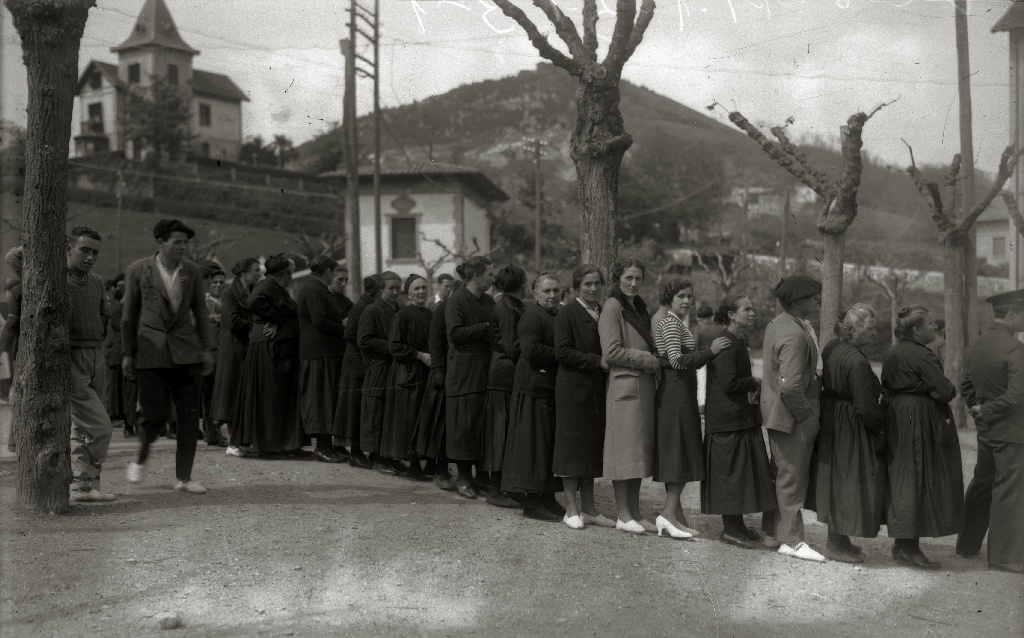
Men and women wait at Escuela Biteri in Hernani to vote in the 1933 elections.

The 1933 elections were the first which women could vote in national elections. The conservatives came out ahead in the elections of 1933. The left blamed their victory on women, and their voting practices in that election. The left viewed women's votes as being controlled by the Church. The elections also saw conservative male leaders try to change the goals of the ACM. Rather than having the ACM try to accomplish political goals, they sought to direct participants to be more engaged in charity work and supporting working-class families.

Campoamor and Kent both lost their seats in these elections.

==== February 1936 elections ====
Campoamor found herself locked out of the political process for the 1936 elections, as she had criticized her Radical Party for not supporting women's issues and removed herself from their list. Serving as President of Organización Pro-Infancia Obrera, she tried to find another political party that would allow her on their list while also advocating for women's rights. Failing to do so, she tried and failed to create her own political party.

During the elections, pamphlets were distributed in Seville that warned women that a leftist Republican victory would result in the government removing their children from their homes and the destruction of their families. Other pamphlets distributed by the right in the election warned that the left would turn businesses over to the common ownership of women.

=== Education ===
The Second Republic had a goal of educating women. This was viewed as a radical concept, and many reactionaries inside the Republic were opposed to it. Many others supported it, seeing education as a tool to allow women to pass along Republican values to their children.

=== Women's rights ===
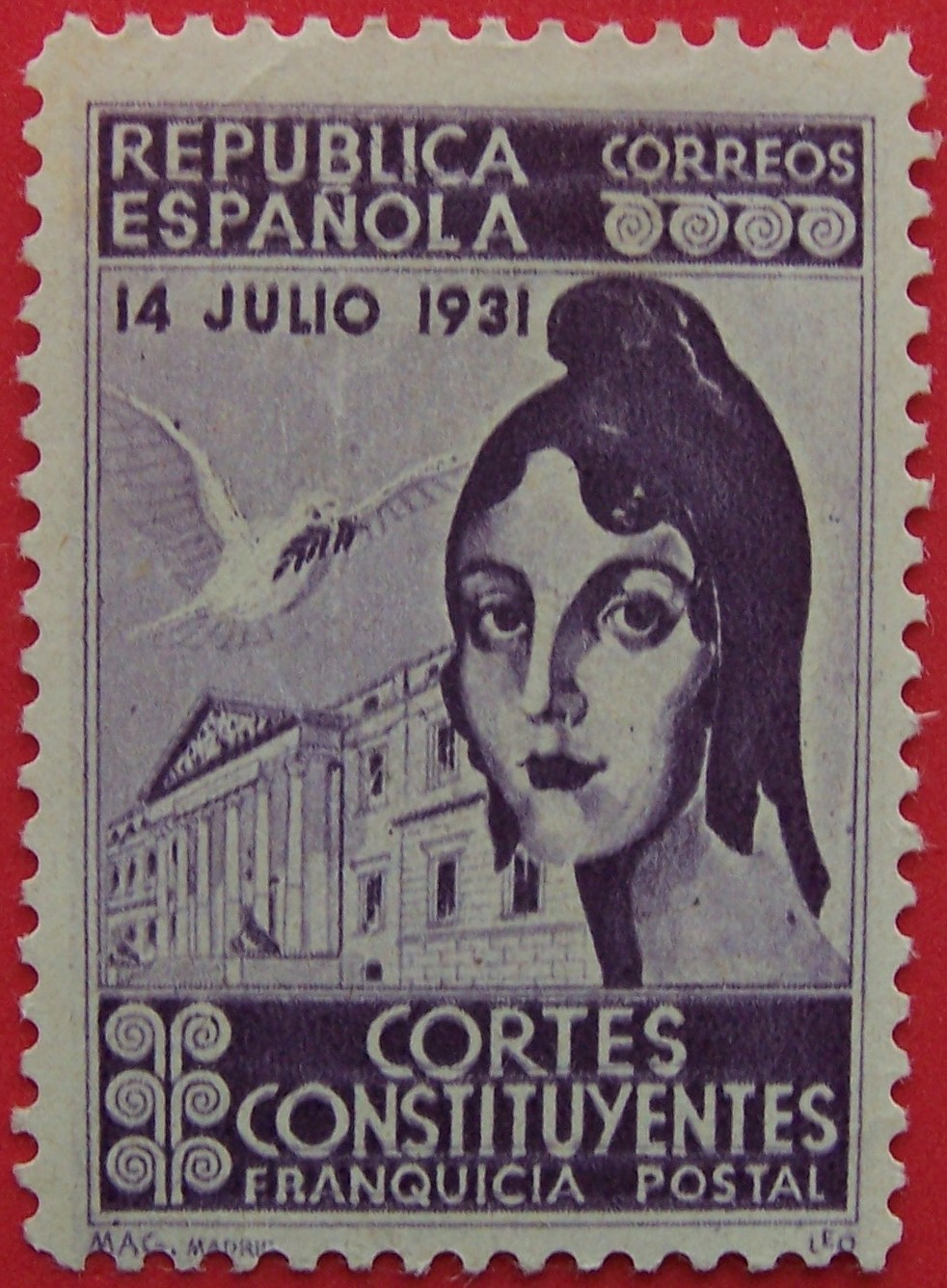
A postage stamp by issued by Correos during the Second Republic honoring women in the 1931 Cortes Constituyentes.

Universal suffrage was finally achieved in December 1931.

Legal equality for women was opposed by many on Spain's right. They saw it as a degeneration of Spain, which would result in the destruction of the Spanish family. This tension about the rights of women was part of their tension over the existence of the Republic, and one of the reason they were opposed to it.

=== Political activity ===
==== Catholics ====
Women involved in Acción Católica de la Mujer (ACM) were involved in challenges to the Second Republic's laws that prohibited Catholic ceremonies and civic activities, including religious processions through towns. They often defied these laws, and were at the front of processionals in order to insure they were allowed to practice their more conservative version of Catholicism. Mothers also continued to enroll their children in and support Catholic education in spite of government attempts to limit it. Despite these political activities, male leadership in the Catholic Church and broader right leaning society attempted to get the ACM to be less political during the Second Republic. They encouraged ACM leadership to focus more on doing charity work, and on assisting working-class families.

To this end, conservative leaders successfully oversaw the merger of ACM with the Unión de Damada del Sagrado Corazón in 1934. The new organization was called the Confederación de Mujeres Católics de Espana (CMCE). As a successful consequence, membership numbers dropped from 118,000 in 1928 to 61,354 members. It also saw the resignation of the more politically active women leaders from the newly formed CMCE. The newly merged organization also encouraged women explicitly to be less political, and participate in at most one or two demonstrations a year.

Young conservative Catholic women defied their leaders, and sought to be politically active and visible in their goals. Sensing the political tides, these women started leaving ACM by 1932 and joined Juventud Católica Femenina in large numbers. From 9,000 members in 1928, the organization grew to 70,0000 by 1936, with the bulk of the increase happening between 1932 and 1935. These young Catholic women took the opportunity to gain public attention in ways that were not connected to their sexuality or charitable works. Many among them welcomed the potential enfranchisement the Second Republic was offering.

==== Falangists ====
===== Sección Femenina de la Falange Española =====
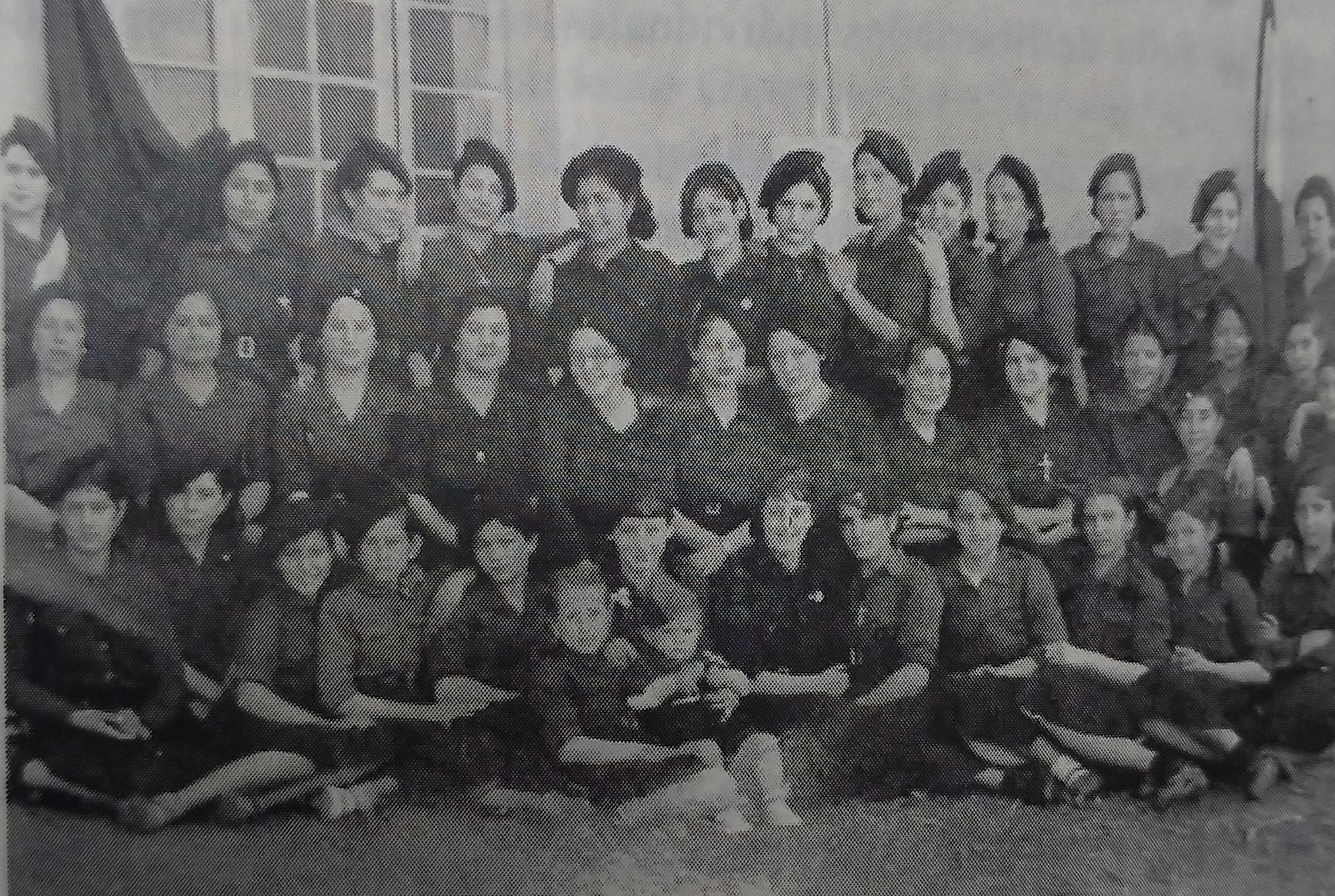
The comrades of Sección Femenina de Falange de Santa Marta. Photo by Inés Cabellero de León. 1936.

Sección Femenina de la Falange Española was founded in 1934. It was led by Pilar Primo de Rivera, sister of José Antonio Primo de Rivera, as a women's auxiliary organization of Falange. Fascist in the mold of Mussolini's Italian party, both organizations were misogynistic in their approach to the goals of building a revolutionary organic society that would support traditional Spanish values. There were three things they saw as critical to doing this: the family, the municipality and the syndicate. Using traditional gender roles from the Catholic Church, they would impose their values on women in the home. Given its goals of making women docile participants in civic life, the women's organization does not meet the definition of a feminist organization. It was the only major Nationalist women's political organization, with a membership of 300 in 1934. By 1939, Sección Femenina would eclipse the male run party in memberships, with over half a million women belonging to the group.

=== Start of the Civil War ===
Location of Melilla, where Nationalist forces started their campaign in 1936.

On 17 July 1936, the Unión Militar Española launched a coup d'état in North Africa and Spain. They believed they would have an easy victory. They failed to predict the people's attachment to the Second Republic. With the Republic largely maintaining control over its Navy, Franco and others in the military successfully convinced Adolf Hitler to provide transport for Spanish troops from North Africa to the Iberian peninsula. These actions led to a divided Spain, and the protracted events of the Spanish Civil War.

Franco's initial coalition included monarchists, conservative Republicans, Falange Española members, Carlist traditionalist, Roman Catholic clergy and the Spanish army. They had support from fascist Italy and Nazi Germany. The Republican side included Socialists, Communists, and various other left wing actors.

== Spanish Civil War (1936 - 1939) ==
The Spanish Civil War started in July 1936, and women across became involved in support roles like nurses or running charitable organizations, or serving nationalist interests by tending to their families behind the front.

=== Role in family ===
Mothers had a variety of different experiences during the Civil War depending on their personal situations. Many mothers in rural areas were apolitical, no matter what side of the front they lived on. They had little access to resources that would have allowed them to be politically engaged, and were often short on resources required for basic living.

For many mothers in rural areas, the idea of being politically engaged was not possible. They had too many things they had to do at home to have time for that. They had to make soap. They had to work in the fields because of national rationing. Most Spanish homes during the war lacked running water at home. Mothers had to acquire water from local wells, lakes or rivers. They had to wash clothing for the whole family, making a journey to a body of water to do that. They also had to be home to prepare food when it was available. Most homes at this time did not have modern kitchens, and mothers had to cook over open flames using hay and wood for heat.

During the war, mothers worked hard to try to maintain a sense of normalcy. This included continuing domestic education, both among Republican and Nationalist women. Topics of focus included understanding the water, agriculture and religious education. Spanish sayings used by mothers at this time included, "After you eat, do not read a single letter." Reading was not viewed as good for digestion. Children were also encouraged by their mothers in rural areas to take a siesta after a meal. Corporal punishment was often the norm for many mothers of all political persuasions during this period. Many mothers went to great lengths to try to feed their children during periods of food shortages. They might sneak into other towns to try to get food rations when the ration in their town was too small. They might forgo eating themselves so their children could have bigger portions.

The war upset the social structure inside the family. Because of survival issues related to food and fear of political persecution, the skills of mother in acquiring and preparing food while also remaining politically invisible meant they began to take on the role of head of household. Silence became a virtue, because doing or saying the wrong thing could lead to death at the hands of Nationalist forces. Women were less likely to be harassed than men, which meant they were often more out of the home. This could create tensions behind closed doors, as it attacked traditional Spanish definitions of masculinity as it made the home the domain of the mother. This change of women being the boss of the home would continue after the Civil War for both Republican and Nationalist families.

=== Civilian women on the home front ===
Many poor, illiterate and unemployed women often found themselves immersed in the ideological battle of the Civil War and its connected violence as a result of forces beyond her control. Some of these women, mostly on the left, chose to try to reassert control by becoming active participants in the violent struggle going on around them. When it came to deciding who was right and wrong, many women had to use their own moral judgement formed by a lifetime to do so. They were not guided by political radicalization leading to ideological based morality.

Women and children behind the lines were used by all sides, as a way of trying to garner support for their sides in the Civil War both internally and internationally. Nationalists often appealed to Catholics overseas, condemning Republican bombings on women in civil populations, claiming over 300,000 women and children had been killed. This met with limited success in the United States, where Catholics were uneasy with bombings against women and children that were being committed by both sides.

In the Republican offensive against Nationalist held Teruel from December 1937 to February 1938, brigades on the ground tried to honor Indalecio Prieto's call to protect civilians, and particularly women and children. They sometimes stopped shelling buildings when people inside made clear they were non-combatant women and children. The reality of the offensive and life on the front lines meant many of those civilians had nothing. Women would often risk their lives to loot recently shelled buildings. They needed furniture to burn to melt snow for water, to cook and to provide some heat. Many women, on both sides in the city, died of starvation during the month long battle.

One tactic employed by Nationalist troops was to use women to try to lure out Republican forces from concealed positions. They would use women's voices or got women to say they were civilians under siege. As a consequence, some Republican troops were hesitant when confronting women under apparent siege on the front as they did not always trust claims of needs for assistance.

==== Nationalist women on the Nationalist homefront ====
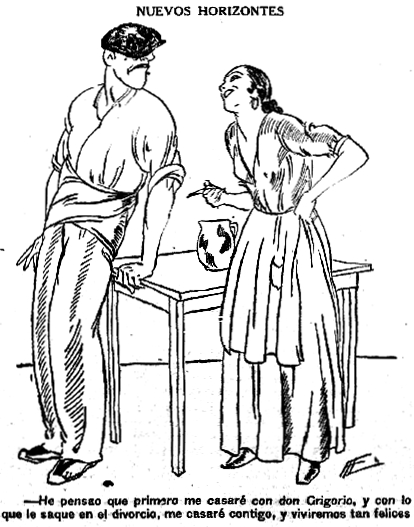
Caricature of Gracia y Justicia, conservative magazine of political humor published in Spain during the Second Republic. It shows a woman with her boyfriend, both humble, planning her marriage to a wealthy man (Don Gregorio) only to get his fortune after the divorce. The vignette is part of the campaign organized by Catholic right media and parties in order to avoid the legalization of divorce. In the text that accompanies the cartoon reads: "I thought that first I will marry Don Gregorio, and with the money that I will take from him in the divorce, I will marry you and live happily."

Falangist women activists were often divided into groups, which were largely based on age. Younger activists often to be outside the home, working on Nationalist goals in Nationalist women's organizations. Older women Nationalist activists believed they should be outside the public eye, serving Nationalist interests by working in the home. Nationalist women in more rural, less cosmopolitan cities, often had more privileges than their urban counterparts. They were able to leave the house, regardless of their marital status, and engage in the everyday tasks required for living. Few people noticed and cared. While Nationalist forces believed women should be at home, the realities of war meant that women were required to work outside the home, in factories and other businesses. During the war, Nationalist publications encouraged women to stay at home in service of the family. They were discouraged from shopping, going to the movies and engaging in other behavior viewed as frivolous by Nationalist male leaders.

Nationalist supporting women behind Nationalist lines also sometimes were involved in auxiliary roles. This included working as nurses, provisioners and support personnel. They were encouraged to do so by men as a means of supporting the traditional Spanish family structure.

Many Spanish women during the war sided with the Nationalists, embracing the strict gender roles put forth by the Catholic Church. The sister of José Antonio Primo de Rivera worked to mobilize these women in Sección Femenina, an umbrella organization of Falange, during the pre-Civil War period and later during the war. From 300 members in 1934, its membership swelled to 400,000 in 1938. Women involved with the organization often went on to work for Auxilio Social, which acted as a social assistance organization for widows, orphans and the destitute by providing them with food and clothing. In all these roles, Spanish Nationalist women never did so with the intention of challenging male authority; they wanted to see the continuance of Republican gender roles and to strengthen the Spanish family.

Starting in October 1937, Sección Femenina de la Falange Española started actively recruiting single women between the ages of 17 and 35 to do social work as a volunteer for six months. In some cases, service was mandatory. It represented the first mass mobilization of women by Nationalist forces.

Auxilio Social became the largest Nationalist social aid organization during the civil war. It was modeled after Nazi Germany's Winter Aid program. Staffed by women wearing blue uniforms with white aprons, they worked in taking care of children and other displaced people, and in distributing aid. The purpose of women in this organization was to serve others in maintaining traditional Spanish families within a patriarchal state.

Nationalist women had another organization for which they could volunteer. It was the Margaritas, and came from traditionalist Carlist philosophies. Their purpose was to support Spanish families, with a husband in charge of a pious and religious wife and obedient children.

Pilar Jaraiz Franco, the niece of Francisco Frano, sympathized with her uncle's politics and, during the Civil War, spent some time in a Republican prison. Despite this, she gradually moved towards more socialist leanings as a result of the rigid gender norms forced on her during her childhood.

Salamanca and Burgos became home to large numbers of women who were wives of military officers on the Nationalist side. They could largely live comfortable, as their part of Spain was not in a state of total war. Both cities had zones for homes, and military zones. The military zones were home to medical services and to prostitutes. Nationalist nurses working in these zones were viewed as essential but transgressive, as they were occupying male spaces. As such, their behavior was always highly watched. Poverty and economic need often pushed many women into prostitution, where it flourished behind Nationalist lines. That Nationalist forces were fighting for a Spain that supported traditional family structures and opposed to prostitution did nothing to stop Nationalist officers from using prostitutes.

Despite nationalist ideals about the role of women, the Nationalist attracted single women from abroad to their cause. These women, by their mere existence, transgressed Nationalist teachings about women as they were traveling alone, accompanied by male guardians, and acting on their own behalves. Many were literate and well traveled. Many came from European aristocratic and were upper class. Full of self-confidence, they made Nationalists uncomfortable, especially in contrast to the typically poor, illiterate Spanish woman who had not traveled. Their advocacy on behalf of Franco was viewed by many as counter-productive as it suggested women could find success outside the home, when Francoists and Nationalists believed women belonged in the home.

Nationalist forces did attract foreign women writers and photographers to their cause. These included Helen Nicholson, the Baroness de Zglinitzki, Aileen O'Brien, Jane Anderson, Pip Scott-Ellis, and Florence Farmborough. These women were all advocates of right wing-ideology, and militantly opposed to Communism. They came from a wide variety of right wing ideologies, including monarchists and fascism.

==== Nationalist women behind Republican lines ====
Many Nationalist sympathizing women were killed behind Republican lines. Around 8,000 priests and nuns were tortured or murdered behind Republican lines. These deaths were part of the over 89,000 executions historians believed were conducted by Republican forces in the lead up to and during the Spanish Civil War.

== Francoist Spain (1938 - 1973) ==
=== Gender roles ===
The end of the Civil War, and the victory of fascist forces, saw the return of traditional gender roles to Spain. This included the unacceptability of women serving in combat roles in the military. Where gender roles were more flexible, it was often around employment issues where women felt an economic necessity to make their voices heard. It was also more acceptable for women to work outside the home, though the options were still limited to roles defined as more traditionally female. This included working as nurses, or in soup kitchens or orphanages.

With strict gender norms back in place, women who had found acceptable employment prior and during the Civil War found employment opportunities even more difficult in the post war period. Teachers who had worked for Republican schools often could not find employment.

Gender norms were further reinforced by Sección Femenina de la Falange Española. Opportunities to work, study or travel required taking classes on cooking, sewing, childcare and the role of women before they were granted. If women did not take or pass these classes, they were denied these opportunities.

=== Motherhood ===
While motherhood was an important ideal during the Franco period, it was one the regime only wanted to see perpetuated among those who shared in their political ideology. Children of mothers with leftist or Republican leanings were often removed from their care in order to prevent mothers from sharing their ideology with their offspring.

=== Feminism ===
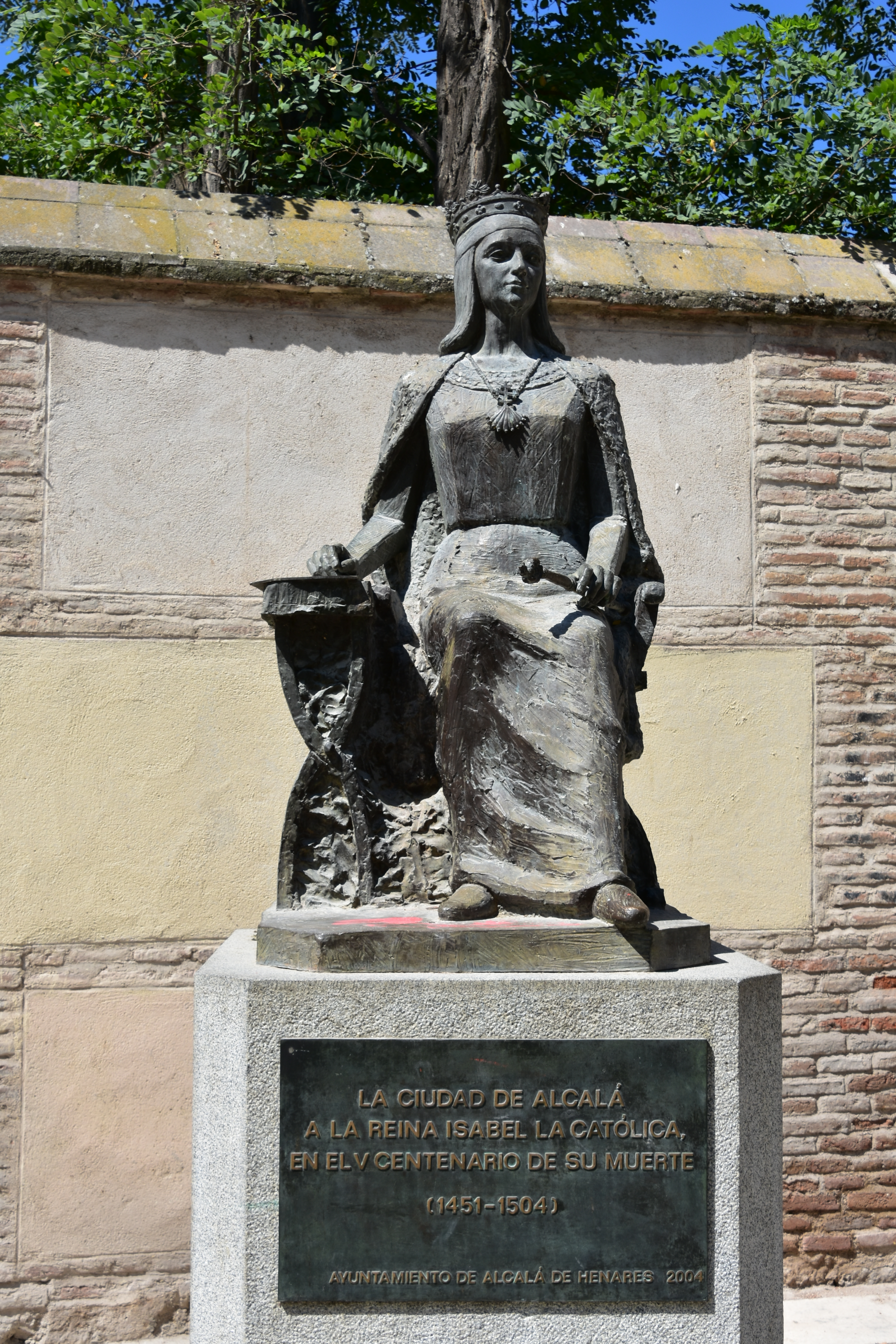
Statue of Isabel the Catholic in Alcala de Henares.

Sección Femenina de la Falange Española worked to depict feminism as a form of depravity. It associated feminism with drug abuse and other evils plaguing society. While not meeting the classical definition of a feminist organization, the state supported its own desired goals for female expression, expressed through Sección Femenina, offered Isabel the Catholic and Teresa of Avila as symbols for Spanish women to look up. They had first been used by Francoist women during the Civil War, and reminded women that their role was to become mothers and to engage in pious domesticity.

Sección Femenina did things like creating agricultural and adult schools, sports centers and libraries. They organized cultural groups and discussion groups. They published their own magazine. They worked to preserve traditional rural life. All of this was done with the underlying goal of encouraging traditional womanhood, of remaining in the home as a good daughter, and later as a good wife and mother. The pride that women got in completing these domestic tasks associated with Sección Femenina's teachings has been described by Guiliana Di Febo as Christian feminism.

Some feminists in Franco's Spain tried to subvert government goals and change policy by becoming directly involved in government institutions. The Castilian Association of Homemakers and Consumers was one organization that attracted the type of feminist that believed that change should come from within. They became regime accepted vehicles for female dissent.

=== Women's rights ===
The pillars for a New Spain in the Franco era became national syndicalism and national Catholicism. The Franco period saw an extreme regression in the rights of women. The situation for women was more regressive than that of women in Nazi Germany under Hitler.

The legal status for women in many cases reverted to that stipulated in the Napoleonic Code that had first been installed in Spanish law in 1889. The post Civil War period saw the return of laws that effectively made wards of women. They were dependent on husbands, fathers and brothers to work outside the house. Women needed permission to do an array of basic activities, including applying for a job, opening a bank account or going on a trip. The law during the Franco period allowed husbands to killed their wives if they caught them in the act of adultery. In March 1938, Franco suppressed the laws regarding civil matrimony and divorce that had been enacted by the Second Republic. It was not until later labor shortages that laws around employment opportunities for women changed. These laws passed in 1958 and 1961 provided a very narrow opportunity, but an opportunity, for women to be engaged in non-domestic labor outside the household. Franco's policies towards women also resulted in Spain having one of the highest rates of illiteracy for women in the western world.

=== Women's media and writing ===
Inside Spain, well connected, often aristocratic Spanish feminists were sometimes able to publish their works for domestic consumption by 1948. This includes works by María Lafitte, Countess of Campo Alanaga, and Lilí Álvarez. Works by Republican pre-war feminists like Rosa Chacel and María Zambrano, who continued to write from exile, also saw their works smuggled into Spain.
