= Women in the workforce in Francoist Spain =

Women in the workforce in Francoist Spain faced high levels of discrimination. The end of the Spanish Civil War saw a return of traditional gender roles in the country. These were enforced by the regime through laws that regulated women's labor outside the home and the return of the Civil Code of 1889 and the former Law Procedure Criminal, which treated women as legally inferior to men. During the 1940s, women faced many obstacles to entering the workforce, including financial penalties for working outside the home, job loss upon marriage and few legally available occupations.

Spain's economic picture began to change in the 1950s, and there was more economic pressure for women to enter the workforce. Some groups like Sección Feminina and Falange responded to this by offering women childcare services in a limited context. Skilled jobs like nursing were highly gendered, with men and women receiving differing educations. The 1960s would see Spain go through a cultural and economic transformation, with the law trying to slowly catch up. Reforms included more opportunities for women in the public sector and women no longer being fired because they were married. More legal reforms took place in 1970, though women's professional opportunities in fields like medicine continued to be limited.

== History (1939–1975) ==
=== 1930s Francoist Spain ===
The policy of the Franco regime with regard to women was a huge setback for the Republic as it set out to impose the traditional Catholic family model based on the total subordination of the wife to her husband. It reduced women to their place in the home as the Labor Charter of 1938 proclaimed changes in order "to free the married woman from the workshop and from the factory." This hindered women's access to education and vocational and professional life and abolished or restricted their rights both in the public and private domains. One example involved Franco returning to the Civil Code of 1889 and the former Law Procedure Criminal, which sanctioned the legal inferiority of women. Women who had been behind Republican lines found themselves locked out from a number of professions just because of the place where they had lived. These included civil service jobs, teaching positions, journalism, and places in professional organizations.

The 1938 Law of Family Subsidies had a negative impact on women's ability to work. By the end of 1939, women could not register as workers at employment offices unless, as heads of family, their economic situation forced them to work.

=== 1940s ===
Numerous obstacles were placed on the work of women, especially married women, and restrictions were placed on their registration in placement registers, requiring their husband's authorization to be hired. In addition, numerous labor ordinances stipulated that as soon as she married, a woman had to leave her job, being compensated with a dowry. A so-called "plus family" function, established in 1945, served as a financial aid whose purpose was "to strengthen the family and its Christian tradition, the perfect society and the foundation of the Nation." In addition, the access of women to large sections of the public administration, especially as superiors, was prevented by law. Women were not permitted to become lawyers of the State, judges, prosecutors, diplomats, property registrars, notaries, labor inspectors, exchange agents or stock exchange employees. Women were also unable to take any jobs related to the military on the grounds that they needed to be protected from war.

However, these measures could not prevent women from working, for "obvious reasons of family subsistence", but always with lower salaries than men, between 30 and 50% less. Women also participated in labor disputes that, according to a provincial delegate of the OSE, "for reasons of their sex and special way of reacting, it is very difficult to convince with reasons, or to discuss them with arguments".

In the 1940s, women were barred from a number of professions as a women's primary job was to be a homemaker. They were prevented from becoming lawyers or judges or roles within the Ministry of Justice. Teachers were purged from the classroom in Spain on a regular basis for a variety of reasons. In Valencia, these included providing sex education or information about contraceptives. Working women could receive a salary 70% less than that of men working exactly the same job.

The Labor Regulation Act of 1942 stated that women had to sign a voluntary dismissal form within a month of being married that resulted in them losing their job. After that, these newly married women had to wait two years before they could re-enter the workforce and only then, if they had permission from their husband. The Labor Contracts Act of 1944 meant women needed permission of their husbands before they were able to sign an employment contract. This act also had a clause that said to work in the industrial or commercial sector, women needed to have proof they had been vaccinated and a doctor's note saying they did not have a contagious disease; no similar requirement existed for men. The 1945 Plus de Cargas Familiares had a negative impact on women's ability to work.

Because of labor market restrictions related to marriage, the vast majority of working women were between the ages of 15 and 25. Most women worked as domestic servants or in commercial service jobs. The vast majority of women had their official employment listed as "housewife". These were women who engaged in domestic labor inside their home for outside clients, doing tasks like cleaning laundry. Women in agricultural jobs were often listed as "housewife". Their presence in agriculture was largely unchanged from the pre-Second Republic period. Women in the industrial sector were primarily concentrated in the textile industry. Women were concentrated in sales clerk and primary school teaching positions in the service sector. Many would have precarious working conditions. In 1942, the average seamstress made 6.74 pesetas a day. The average female agricultural worker made 7.08 pesetas a day. Midwives made between 40 and 525 pesetas for every birth they attended.

In the 1940s, women represented only 15% of workers in industry and 23% in the service sector, which included domestic servants. A lack of jobs in the 1940s also led to male resentment against women, as the men believed women were stealing their jobs and interfering with their right to work. This often meant women were vulnerable to being paid less or accepting casual jobs.

Women who did work were doubly burdened, as they were expected to maintain the home, take care of the children in addition to working outside the home. Married women with young children often had high results of absenteeism on full-time jobs where they were expected to work 40 to 48 hours a week. Young, single, childless women had lower rates of absenteeism than their married counterparts with children. Successful married women in the workforce in 1940s, 1950s and 1960s were often blind to their own privilege, and they were often unsympathetic to other women with similar double burdens. Women working outside the home in the 1940s were often demeaned and devalued by others who were unsympathetic to their economic situation and tried to impose their belief that these women should stay at home.

==== Medical jobs ====
One of the differences between nursing as an occupation in Spain and in English-speaking countries was that the latter had deep roots in the feminist movement. This was not the case in Spain, where nursing was viewed as a lower rung in the broader Spanish medical hierarchy. Even in the face of international programs like the Red Cross and visiting medical professionals from abroad, Spanish medicine resisted making its hierarchy and teaching practices less sexist. Men and women received different training for the same roles, be it being a midwife, nurse or medical practitioner. Training for women was focused on maintaining the woman's virtue and on her alleged inferior intellect. In Francoist Spain, female nurses were treated as carers, while male nurses were treated as healers. This was a result of gender biases in teaching and the concept of scientific knowledge possessed by each gender, especially in the medical context. Caring was more centered around the home, while healing was performed outside the home.

Because midwives appeared to be so frequently involved in sharing knowledge about abortion and contraceptives and performing abortions, the male-led scientific community in Spain tried to marginalize these women. Professionalization in medicine would help to further relegate the importance of midwives in Spain. Further attempts to dislodge midwives from the birthing process included accusing them of witchcraft and quackery, trying to make them appear unscientific. This was all part of a medical and eugenic science driven effort to reduce the number of abortions in Spain.

=== 1950s ===
The situation of women began to change in the 1950s and especially in the 1960s as a result of the economic and social transformations that took place in those years. It led to a progressive increase in women's legal salaried work, as well as greater access to the middle and upper levels of education. All of this involved changes in the family structures themselves, the increase in the presence of women in public spheres and a greater diffusion of alternative models on the female condition, which contrasted clearly with the values fostered by the official Francoist approach. It was not until later labor shortages that laws around employment opportunities for women changed. The laws passed in 1958 and 1961 provided a very narrow opportunity, but an opportunity nevertheless, for women to be engaged in non-domestic labor outside the home.

Adelia Díaz commented on women's issues in the 1950s: "The woman depended on everything from a man, she did not have a bank account in her own name, it had to be either with the father's name or, once married, with the husband's name." Money from women's jobs would be put into bank accounts controlled by husbands and fathers, with women unable to access these funds.

Sección Feminina and Falange provided childcare services during the 1950s and 1960s to women working in the agricultural sector. Official women's participation in this industry were around 5.5%, but informal participation was much higher, resulting in the need for childcare.

==== Medical jobs ====
The introduction of the Ayudante Técnico Sanitario (ATS) in 1952 increased gender inequality in the medical field. Women, unlike men, who enrolled in ATS programs were required to board at the school; men could commute in for their classes. Women were taught a course called Home Teachings (Spanish: Enseñanzas de hogar) whereas the male equivalent was Medical-legal autopsy (Spanish: Autopsia médico-legal).

==== Servants ====
Many maids faced unwanted male sexual attention they could not escape, and were sometimes sexually assaulted. They would become pregnant and forced out of their jobs. Men would also blackmail them over these relationships. Because many were unmarried, when relationships were discovered, even those resulting from male coercion, they would be fired for being involved. This would leave these women destitute. Many turned to prostitution as they could find no other source of income.

=== 1960s ===
Technological innovations of the 1950s and 1960s pushed a lot of women into the workforce at a time when Spain's economy was undergoing a radical transformation.

A change in the law on 22 July 1961 made it easier for women to gain employment in the public sector. Despite less stringent laws, they still faced many restrictions, including the need for their husband to approve their job before allowing them to sign an employment contract. The 1961 Law on Political Rights was supported by Sección Feminina. This gave women in the workforce additional rights they had previously lacked by recognizing the importance of their work. This law entitled single women being to a salary equal to that of her male peers working in the same job. Pilar Primo de Rivera commented, "The law rather than being feminist is, on the contrary, supportive of what men can give to women as the emptier glass. Why else would we want the man's salary to be sufficiently remunerative so that women, especially married woman, would not have to work out of necessity! I assure you that if family life was sufficiently endowed, 90% of women would not work. For us, it is much more convenient and more desirable to have all the problems solved. But there are many families not just in Spain but around the world that cannot dispense with working women, precisely because it ensures there is enough for their children's care and education, the primary goal of marriage."

Discrimination in employment based on gender was banned in 1961, with exceptions for the judiciary, armed forces and merchant navy. Reforms also meant that women were legally guaranteed the same wage as their male counterparts. In 1961, 4% of all Spanish women between the ages of 16 and 65 described their occupation as professional writer. This occupational description included both fiction and non-fiction writers, romance novelists and newspaper reporters.

Until 1962, women were forced to leave the workforce when they married. In exchange for doing this, they were given a small monetary compensation. A 1963 legal reform meant employers could no longer dismiss women because they were married. Nevertheless, the law still required women to have their husband's permission before starting work. In 1966, the law was amended to allow women to be magistrates, judges and prosecutors. A Decree was issued on 27 October 1967 that supported the principle of equal pay for equal work.

Trade unions were officially not allowed in Francoist Spain with the exception of the Falange led union organizations. These tended to attract little female membership. When they did, Falangist women would often find themselves working alongside socialist and communist women and would serve as a focused source of opposition to the regime before Comisiones Obreras was banned in 1967. Comisiones Obreras served a pivotal role in positioning the PCE as a leading union organizer and key opposition player during the Franco period. CCOO would also attract critical Communist women's anti-regime activists, among the most important of the area.

=== 1970-1975 ===
In 1970, only 4.4% of all physicians were women. A 20 August 1970 Decree brought in new legislation on maternity leave. Pregnant women could now leave the workforce without penalty for a period of between one and three years. Other rules that changed as a result of this decree included the eliminating of gender discrimination during periods of apprenticeships. Another change was that working women could continue their jobs after they married or could terminate their contract early by paying a compensatory dowry.
