= Husband (surname) =

Husband is the surname of:

- Agnes Husband (1852–1929), Scottish politician: one of Dundee's first female councillors and suffragette
- Charles Husband (1908–1983), English architect and consulting engineer
- Cody Husband (born 1988), Canadian Football League player
- Deolus W. Husband (1959–1989), American composer
- Gary Husband (born 1960), British jazz and rock drummer, pianist and bandleader
- Herman Husband (1724–1795), American politician, radical, Quaker and preacher
- Jackie Husband (1918–1992), Scottish footballer and manager
- James Husband (footballer) (born 1994), English footballer
- Jimmy Husband (born 1947), English retired footballer
- John Husband (1839–1919), British politician
- Les Husband (1898–1970), Australian rules footballer
- Marget Husband (1887 - 1986), British nurse
- Rick Husband (1957–2003), American astronaut
- Ron Husband (born 1950), American animator
- Stephen Husband (born 1990), Scottish footballer
- Tom Husband (1936–2023), Scottish engineer and professor
- Tony Husband (1950–2023), British cartoonist
- William Husband (1822–1887), British civil and mechanical engineer
- William Husband (footballer), Scottish footballer in the early decades of the 20th century

== See also ==
- Husbands (surname)
