= Consigna =

Monthly education magazine in Spain (1940–1977)

- Categories: Education magazine
- Frequency: Monthly
- Founded: 1940
- First issue: December 1940
- Final issue: 1977
- Company: Sección Femenina
- Country: Spain
- Based in: Madrid
- Language: Spanish
- ISSN: 2172-0509
- OCLC: 984802934

Consigna (Spanish: Slogan) was a monthly educational magazine which was published in Madrid, Spain, between 1940 and 1977. It was one of the publications of the Sección Femenina, the women's branch of the Falange political party. Its subtitle was Revista pedagógica de la sección femenina de FET y de las JONS (Spanish: Pedagogical magazine of the women's section of FET and the JONS).

== History and profile ==
Consigna was established by the Sección Femenina, the ruling party's women organization. It was first published in December 1940 and came out monthly. Its headquarters was in Madrid. The magazine targeted teachers working at the provincial schools and provided information about living in rural settings. In fact, teachers were obliged to subscribe to the magazine. In the 1960s the magazine's audience was primary school teachers. Between 1942 and 1947 it covered a home section, including articles on nutrition and table decorating. The magazine contained a cooking section from 1953 to 1971 which included recipes for the teachers to teach their students. Consigna also featured various recipes for religious holidays. The proceedings of the International Women's Congress held in Madrid in 1970 were published in the magazine.

The magazine folded in 1977 when the Sección Femenina was also closed.
