= The Husbands =

The Husbands may refer to:

- The Husbands (band), an American garage punk band
- The Husbands (novel), a 2024 novel by Holly Gramazio
- The Husbands (TV series), an upcoming TV series based on the novel

== See also ==
- Husband (disambiguation)
