= Husband, Pennsylvania =

Unincorporated community in Pennsylvania, U.S.

Coordinates: 40°02′30″N 79°06′06″W

Husband is an unincorporated community in Somerset County, Pennsylvania, United States.

== History ==
A post office called Husband was established in 1884, and remained in operation until 1903. The community has the name of Harmon Husband, a pioneer citizen.
