= Husbands (surname) =

Husbands is a surname which may refer to:

- Anthony Husbands (born 1956), Trinidad and Tobago sprinter
- Clifford Husbands (1926–2017), former Governor-General of Barbados
- Michael Husbands (born 1983), English-born Saint Lucian association footballer
- Patrick Husbands (born 1973), Barbadian-born Canadian jockey
- Phil Husbands, English professor of computer science and artificial intelligence
- Sandra Husbands (born 1959), Barbadian politician
- Simon Husbands (born 1969), Barbadian jockey

== See also ==
- Rosemary Husbands-Mathurin, Saint Lucian politician
- Husband (surname)
