= Les Husband =

Australian rules footballer

Personal information
- Full name: Lindsay David Husband
- Born: 12 July 1898; Richmond, Victoria
- Died: 11 March 1970 (aged 71); Prahran, Victoria
- Height: 180 cm (5 ft 11 in)
- Weight: 72 kg (159 lb)
- Positions: Ruck, Half-back

Playing career^{1}
Years	Club	Games (Goals)
1923–24	Carlton	14 (2)
- ^{1} Playing statistics correct to the end of 1924.

Lindsay David "Les" Husband (12 July 1898 – 11 March 1970) was an Australian rules footballer who played with Carlton in the Victorian Football League (VFL).

== Early life ==
Les Husband was born in Richmond, Victoria on 12 July 1898.

== Career ==
=== VFL ===
==== Carlton Blues career: 1923-1924 ====
Under captain coach, Horrie Clover, Les would join the Carlton Blues for his first senior match at 24 years old as a ruck. The game would take place on 7 July 1923 against the Geelong Cats in round 9 of the season.

== Ice hockey ==
Les Husband played ice hockey for the Brighton Ice Hockey Club in the 1924 season of the Victorian Ice Hockey Association; he played right wing.
