= Pilar Primo de Rivera =

Spanish politician (1907–1991)

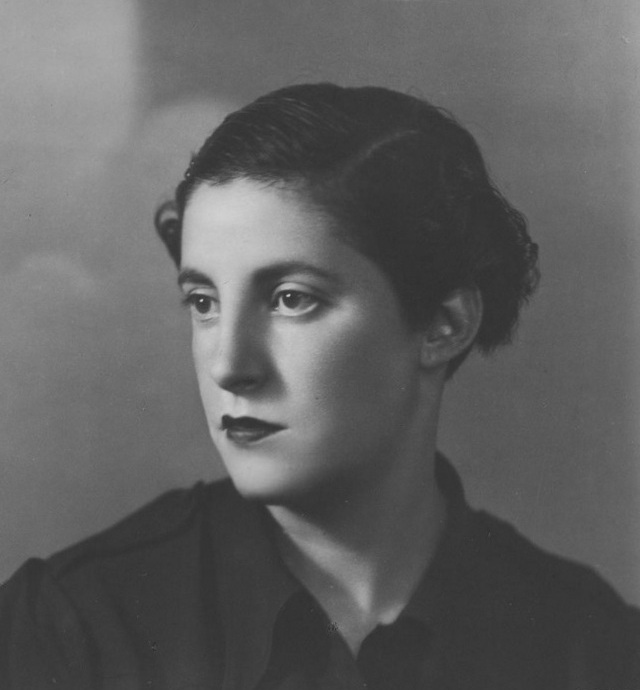
- Born: María del Pilar Primo de Rivera y Sáenz de Heredia; 4 November 1907; Madrid, Spain
- Died: 17 March 1991 (aged 83); Madrid, Spain
- Resting place: Saint Isidore Cemetery
- Occupation: Politician
- Political party: MES (1933); FE (1932-1933); FE y de las JONS (1933-1937); FET y de las JONS (1937-1977)
- Father: Miguel Primo de Rivera
- Relatives: José Antonio Primo de Rivera (brother)

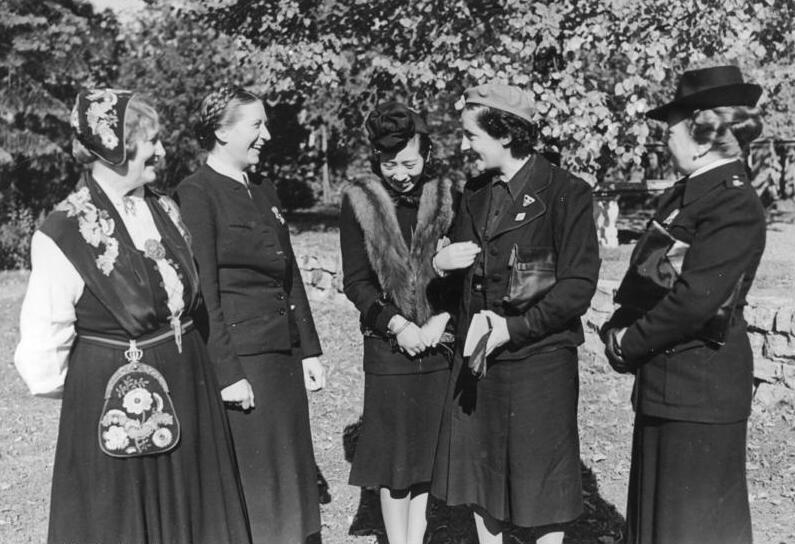
L.t.r. Olga Bjoner, Gertrud Scholtz-Klink, Toyoko Ōshima, Pilar Primo de Rivera, and Olga Medici del Vascello in 1941

María del Pilar Primo de Rivera y Sáenz de Heredia, 1st Countess of the Castle of La Mota (4 November 1907 – 17 March 1991), was the sister of José Antonio Primo de Rivera, founder of the Falange, a political movement of Spain, and the daughter of Spanish dictator General Miguel Primo de Rivera, 2nd Marquis of Estella.

She was an enthusiastic member of the Falange, heading its Sección Femenina ("Women's Section"). Unlike two of her brothers (both put to death by the Republicans), she survived the Spanish Civil War, during which she met Adolf Hitler, Benito Mussolini, and Antonio Salazar. She attempted to prevent reprisals being taken against the widows of Republican militants, and supported the ascent of King Juan Carlos I in 1975, but was disappointed when the paternalist system – the Spanish State – was dismantled during the Spanish transition to democracy.

Pilar became president of the Association of Sección Femenina Veterans in November 1977, and held the post until her death. The main seat of the association was at the Castle of La Mota.

In addition to her political duties, Pilar carried out a good deal of work compiling numerous different forms of Spanish folklore, specially in the fields of regional music and dances.

She never married. Fascist pioneer Ernesto Giménez Caballero conceived the idea of arranging a marriage between her and Adolf Hitler, but this plan never came to fruition. Primo de Rivera commented in her memoirs that she would have not accepted because of personal reasons but the idea made her feel flattered.

== Genealogy ==
Ancestors of Pilar Primo de Rivera y Sáenz de Heredia

8. José Primo de Rivera y Ortiz de Pinedo
4. Miguel Primo de Rivera y Sobremonte
9. Juana Sobremonte y Larrazábal
2. Miguel Primo de Rivera y Orbaneja
10. Sebastián Orbaneja y Pérez
5. Inés Orbaneja y Pérez de Grandallana
11. Juana Pérez de Grandallana y Angulo
1. Pilar Primo de Rivera y Sáenz de Heredia
12. Manuel Antonio Sáenz de Heredia y Sicilia
6. Gregorio Sáenz de Heredia y Tejada
13. María Cesárea Tejada y Santa María
3. Casilda Sáenz de Heredia y Suárez de Argudín
14. José Antonio Suárez-Argudín y García Barroso
7. Ángela Suárez-Argudín y Ramírez de Arellano
15. María Teresa Ramírez de Arellano y Fernández de Zaliella
