= La Mota Castle (Medina del Campo) =

Fortress in Castile and León, Spain

Coordinates: 41.3090°N 4.9085°W

- Castillo de La Mota
- Medina del Campo, Province of Valladolid, Castile and León, in Spain
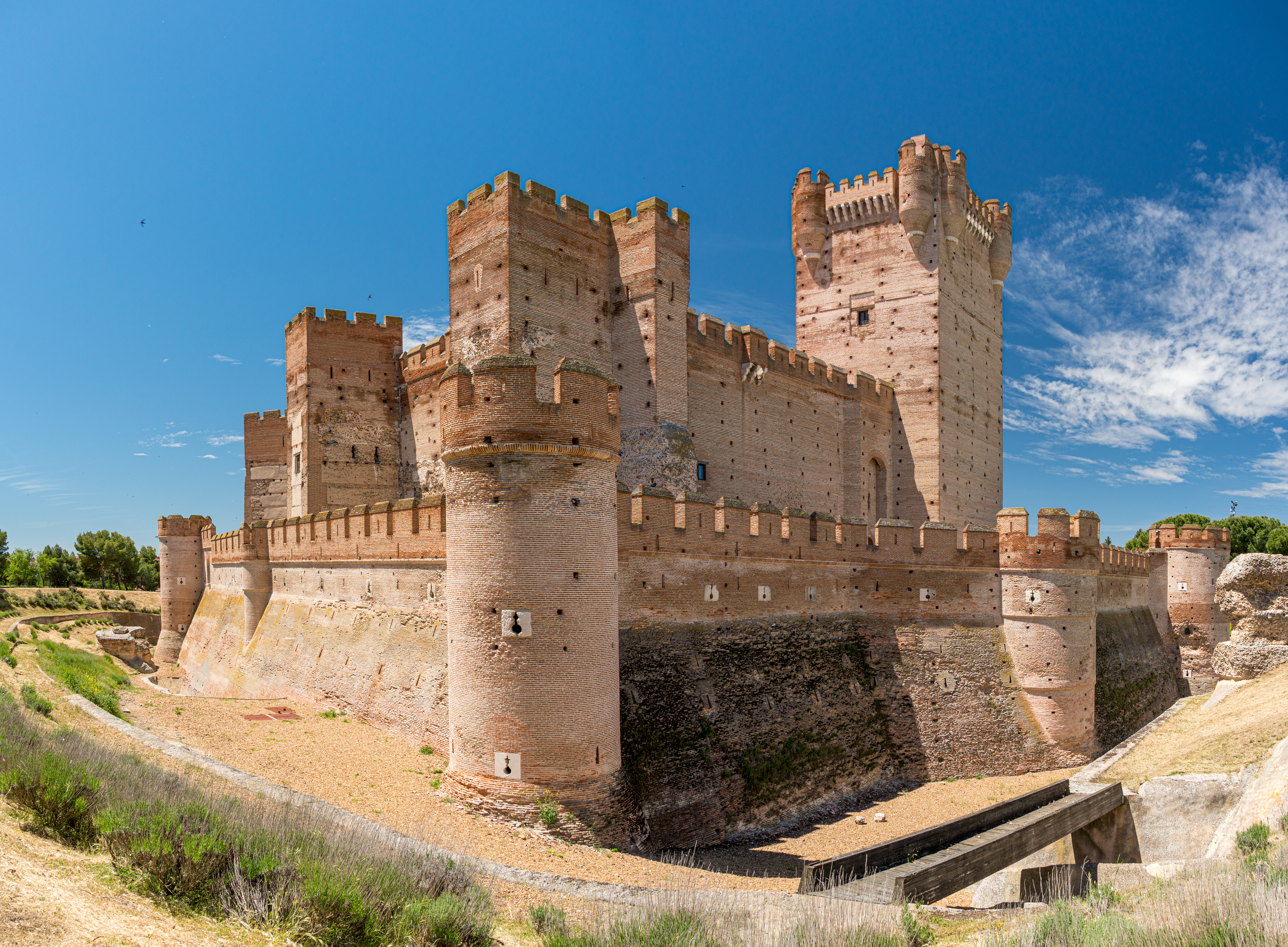
- La Mota Castle

Site information
- Type: Castle
- Owner: Junta of Castile and León
- Open to the public: Yes
- Condition: Spanish Property of Cultural Interest; Castle of La Mota; 3 June 1931; RI-51-0000980

Site history
- Built: 14th century-15th century
- Materials: Bricks

The La Mota Castle or Castillo de La Mota is a medieval fortress in the town of Medina del Campo, province of Valladolid, Spain. It is so named because of its location on an elevated hill, a mota (in Spanish), from where it dominates the town and surrounding land. The adjacent town came to be surrounded by an expanding series of walls in subsequent years, of which little remains.

It has been protected by the state since 1904, first as a national monument and more recently as a site of cultural interest, or Bien de Interés Cultural.

== Overview ==
The castle's main feature is the large outer barbican. The interior castle has a trapezoidal plan, with four towers and a square inner court. It has a large square keep and an inner curtain wall, which was used for archers.

Access to the castle was originally over a drawbridge. It is made from local red brick, stone being used only for some details.

== History ==
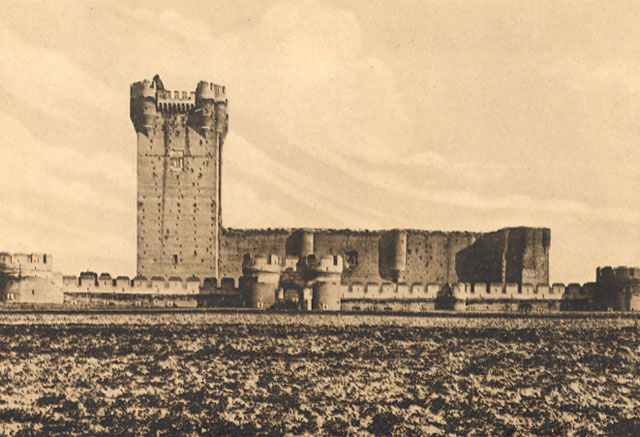
Old photo of the keep

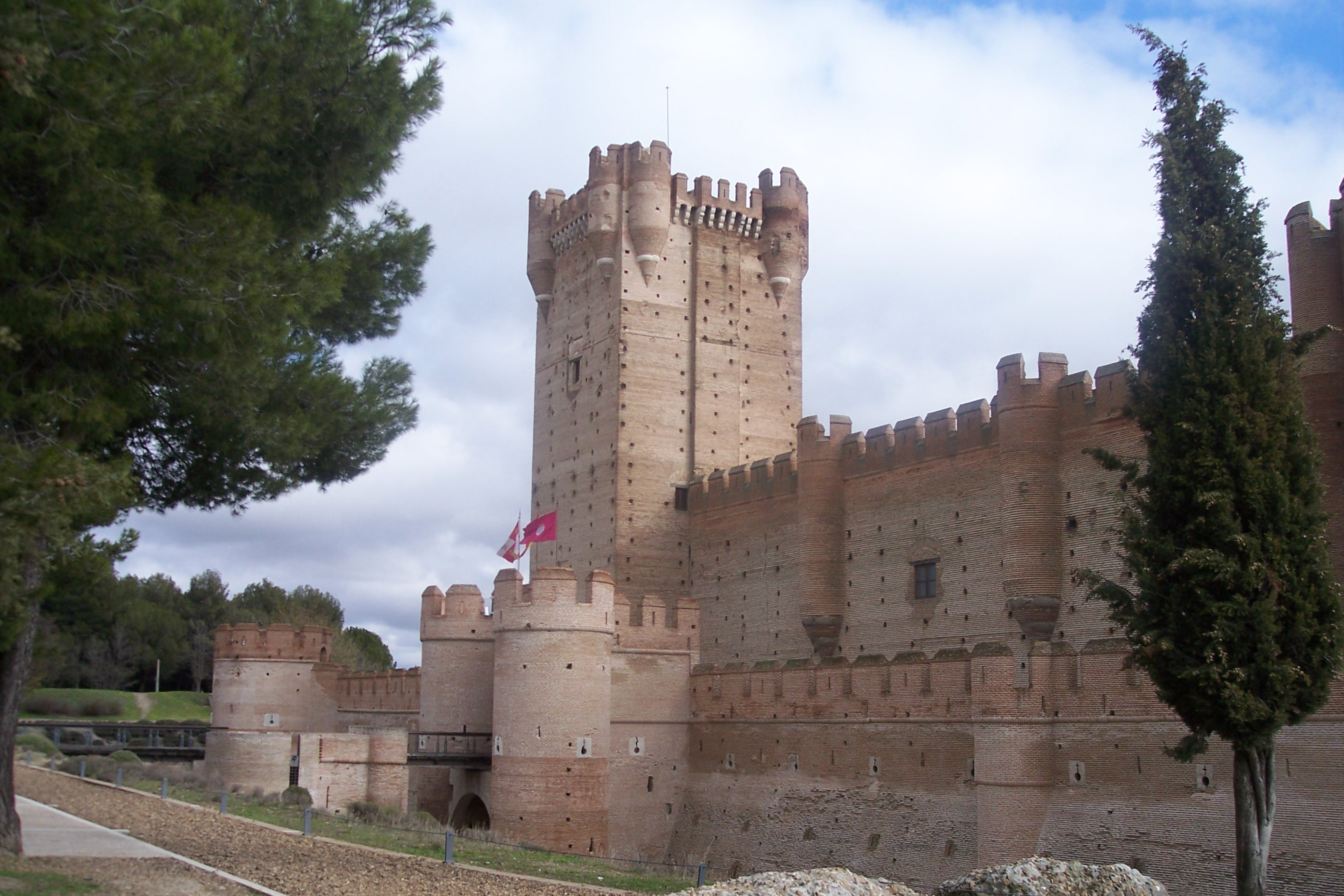
Side view

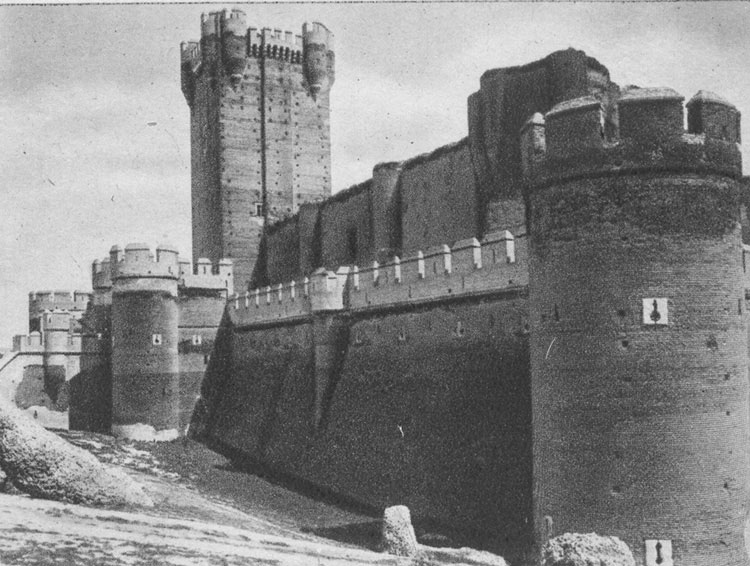
Old image of the castle

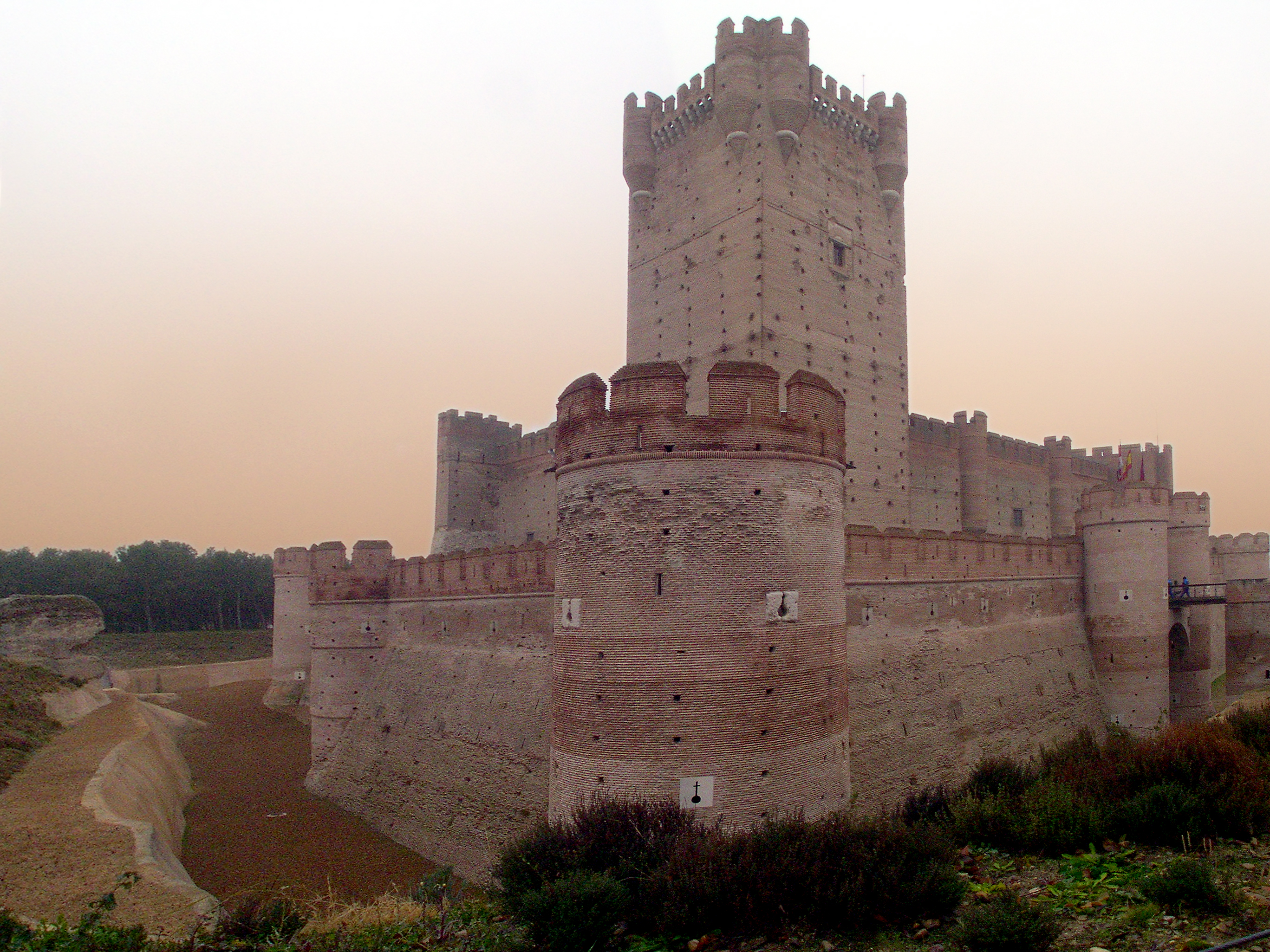
Panoramic view of La Mota Castle

Initial fortification of the village, repopulated after Moorish depredations, led to the creation of a fortress on the site, starting in 1080. The village soon grew alongside. In 1354, Henry of Trastamara is known to have taken the fortress by force. In 1390, King John I of Castile granted the town to his son, the infante Ferdinand of Antequera, future king of Aragon. After the latter's death in 1416, his son, John II of Aragon, in 1433 taxed local residents to help the construction at the Mota. During the following century the castle and town changed hands between the rival kings of Castile and Aragon, with the castle and town being sometimes held by opposing sides. In 1439, for example, the prince of Aragon locked the town gates, thereby imprisoning the Castilian king within the castle walls. In 1441, the Castilian king was able to obtain the surrender of some 250 soldiers of Aragon within the castle.

After the First Battle of Olmedo in 1445, the castle came once and for all into hands of the Castilian monarchy. In 1460, King Henry IV of Castile built the central tower. In 1464, Henry gave the castle to the Archbishop of Toledo, Alonso Carrillo, who soon betrayed the king and backed the rival claimant Afonso V of Portugal. After the castle had been taken by force it fell by 1467 into the hands of supporters of King Afonso, whilst the village supported Henry.

Subsequently the castle was disputed between the princess claimant, Isabella of Castile, and her cousin of dubious paternity, the princess Juana la Beltraneja.

After a succession of owners, in 1475 the crown of Castile reclaimed the castle and built an artillery bastion, on the entrance of which are the heraldic symbols of the Catholic Monarchs, Ferdinand and Isabella.

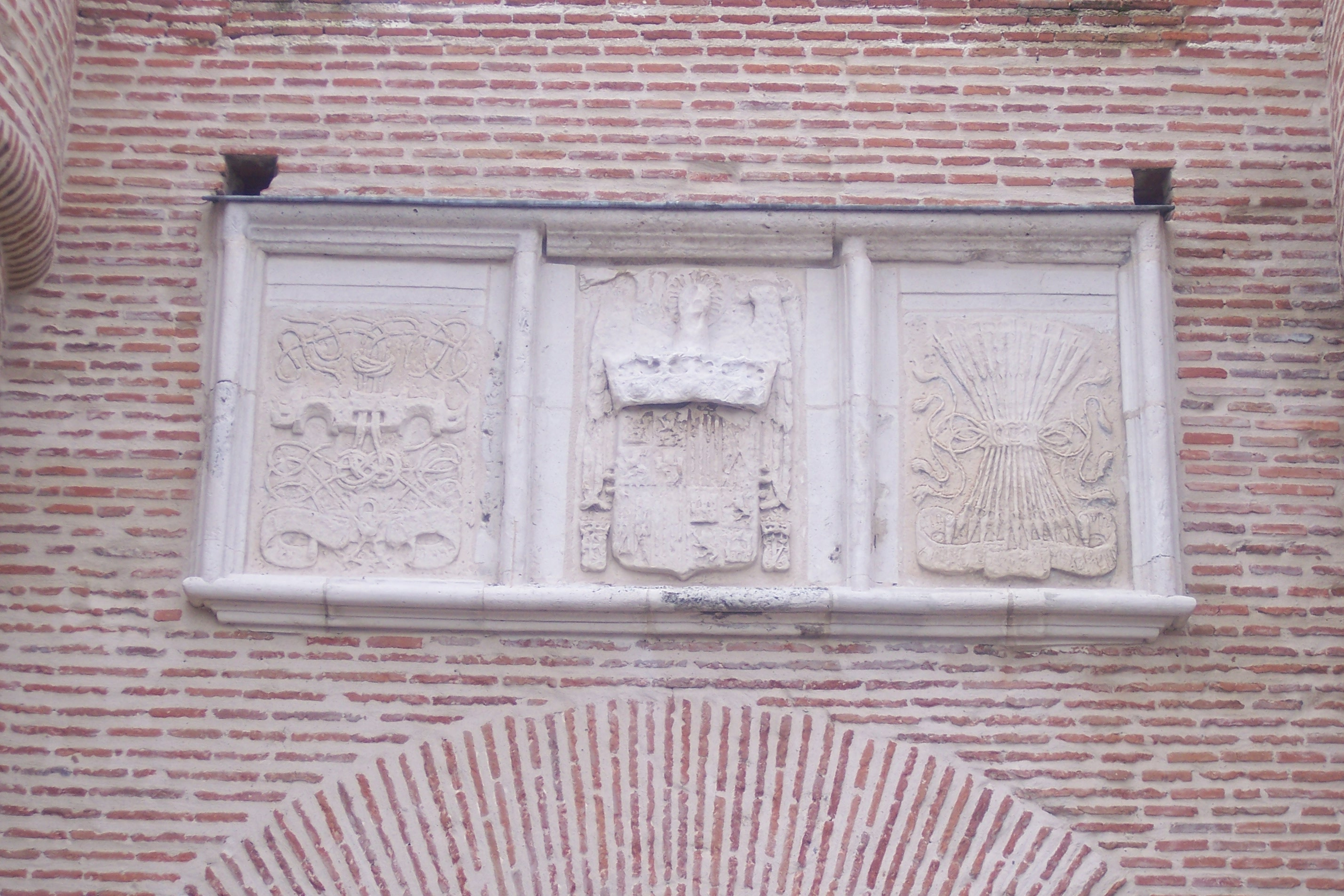
Shields over main gate, 1483

The castle became a prominent prison and variously housed Hernando Pizarro, Rodrigo Calderón, Duke Ferdinand of Calabria and Cesare Borgia, among others. The last of them is known for having escaped from the nearly 40-metre-high tower by climbing down a rope.

In 1939, with the end of Spanish Civil War, dictator Franco lent the castle to Sección Femenina ("Female Section") of FET y de las JONS as its headquarters. Restoration works were undertaken between 1939 and 1942. On 29 May 1942, it took place the delivery ceremony of the castle to the Female Section's Senior Command School. The official act, with more than 10,000 attendees, was presided over by Generalísimo Franco accompanied by personalities like José Ibáñez Martín, Pedro Laín Entralgo, José Luis de Arrese, Ramón Serrano Suñer or Dionisio Ridruejo. Franco's speech praised Isabella I of Castile's policy as a "totalitarian and racist revolution, in the end, for being Catholic", and condemned the Second Spanish Republic's liberal policies. The Senior Command School closed in January 1977.

== Sources ==
- Urrea Fernandez, Jesús; Jesús M. Parrado Del Olmo (1986). Historia de Medina del Campo y su tierra. Nacimiento y expansión. Vol. 1. Ayuntamiento de Medina del Campo. 84-505-4412-2.
- Cobos Guerra, Fernando; José Javier De Castro Fernandez (1998). Castillos y Fortalezas Castilla y León. León: Edilesa. 84-8012-186-6.
