= Sección Femenina =

Women's branch of the Spanish political party Falange

Female Section Sección Femenina
- Leader: Pilar Primo de Rivera
- Founded: 12 July 1934
- Dissolved: 7 April 1977
- Headquarters: Madrid, Spain
- Newspaper: Mujeres Nacional-sindicalista
- Ideology: Francoism; Falangism; National Catholicism
- Political position: Far-right
- Religion: Roman Catholicism
- National affiliation: SEU (1934); FE de las JONS (1934–1937); FET y de las JONS (1937–1977)

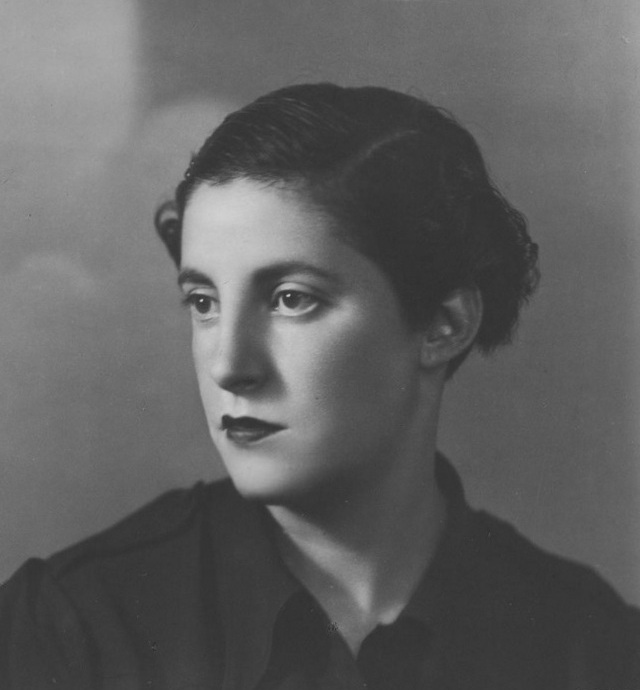
Pilar Primo de Rivera.

The Sección Femenina ("Female Section"; SF) was the women's branch of the Falange political movement in Spain. Founded in 12 July 1934 as part of the Sindicato Español Universitario (SEU) of the Falange Española de las JONS (FE de las JONS), and fully incorporated to FE de las JONS later in the year, it remained as part of the FET y de las JONS following the 1937 Unification Decree, subsequently becoming an official institution of the single-party of the Francoist dictatorship. Following General Franco's death and the beginning of the transition to democracy, it was disbanded on 7 April 1977 together with all Movimiento Nacional institutions. Sección Femenina was led throughout its history by Pilar Primo de Rivera, the younger sister of Falange Española founder José Antonio Primo de Rivera.

Sección Femenina in Francoist Spain were an important organization in defining Spanish womanhood. They were part of fascist organization Falange, with their ideology based on the teachings of the party's founder José Antonio Primo de Rivera and implemented by his sister, Pilar Primo de Rivera. Their social structure in the Francoist period mirrored that of Falange.

Sección Feminina's post-war activity involved conveying the primary role of women was in helping the Spanish state and their families through domestic contributions. The Castillo de la Mota in Medina del Campo was the center of the Escuela Superior de Formación de la Sección Femenina in the Francoist period. Its inauguration was attended by 10,000 girls and young women. The organization published magazines and produced radio shows to support their concept of Spanish womanhood. They also organized a social service program which women needed to go through in order to get a passport, drivers license, join an association or obtain educational titles.

== History ==
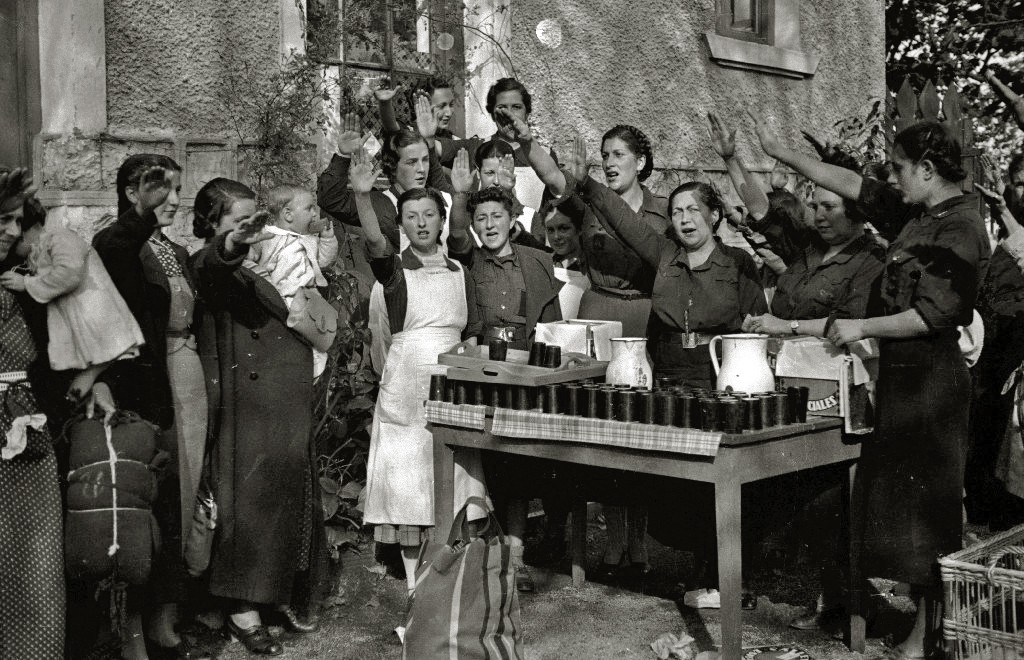
A group of members of the SF in Gipuzkoa rendering the Roman salute (1937)

Sección Femenina was conceived from the beginning as an extension of the domestic role of women to the public sphere, though it took part in political activities during the 1936 general election campaign. During the Second Republic the members of Sección Femenina supported the male Falangists in tasks such as paying visits to imprisoned members and their families. Following the breakout of the Civil War in 1936 they supported the families of those killed in the National faction and took care of the basic assistance to the population of conquered cities. In 1937 Sección Femenina became an official institution as Franco entrusted it the organization of Servicio Social de la Mujer (Social Service for Women), a compulsory female equivalent of the Francoist military service centered in housework. The Castle of La Mota in Medina del Campo, Valladolid served as its headquarters from 1942.

Initially Sección Femenina was organised in three delegaciones: Movimiento femenino (led by Pilar Primo de Rivera), Auxilio Social (led by Mercedes Sanz-Bachiller, the widow of Onésimo Redondo) and Frentes y Hospitales (led by María Rosa Urraca Pastor). The three leaders did not work together well. Following constant clashes with Primo de Rivera, Urraca resigned in 1938 and Sanz was marginalized after the Civil War.

With the outbreak of the Civil War and the defeat and exile of the Republic in 1939, the Lyceum Club Femenino was dismantled and became the "Medina Club", run by the Sección Femenina.

=== Ideology ===
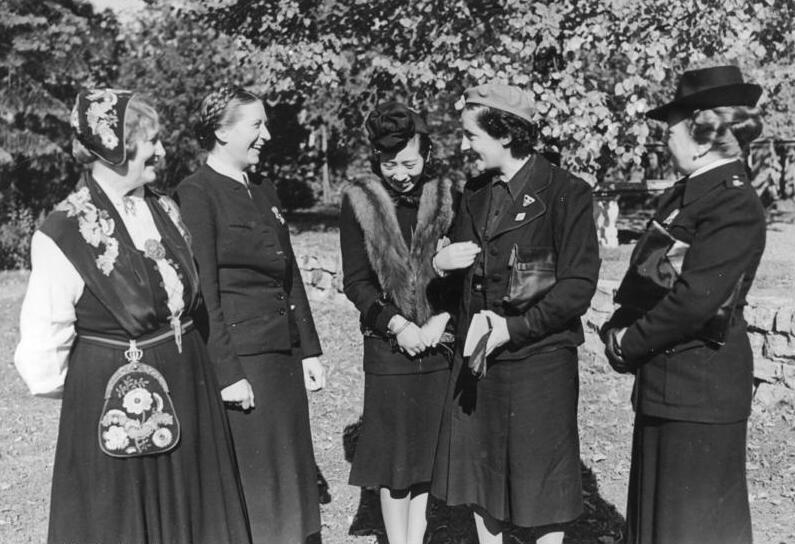
Olga Bjoner (left), Gertrud Scholtz-Klink, Toyoko Oshima, Pilar Primo de Rivera and Olga Medici in Nazi Germany, 1941.

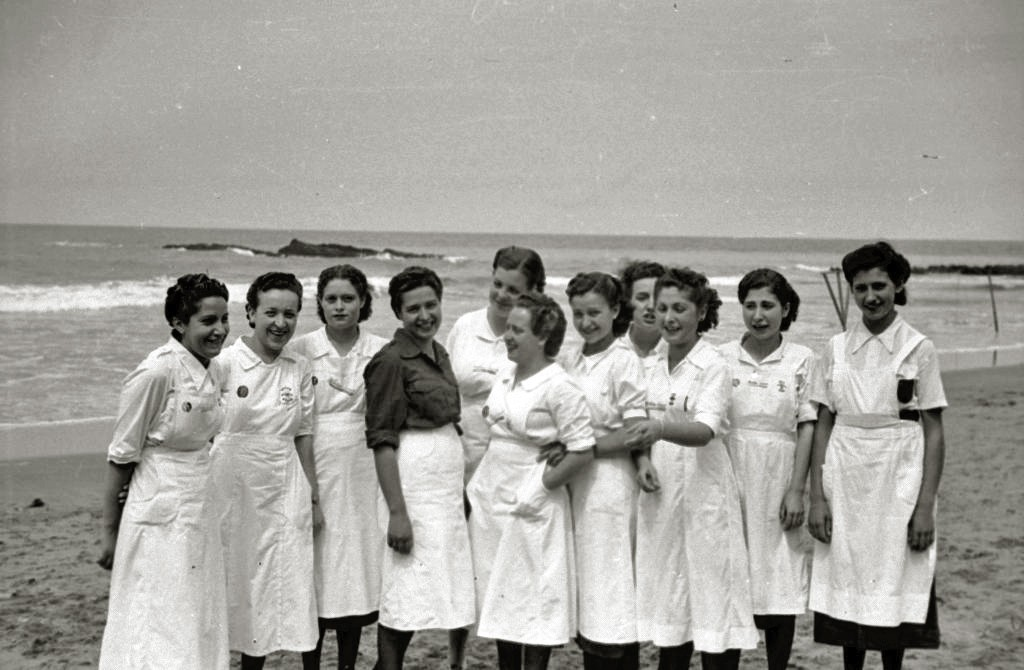
Volunteers of Sección Femenina in Zumaia, 1939.

Pilar Primo de Rivera summed up the organization's mission as a silent, constant labor that will bring us no compensation but thinking how thanks to Falange's work women will be cleaner, children will be healthier and houses will be tidier. Sección Femenina's main role was instructing Spanish women in Francoist patriotic, religious and social morals. Women were taught they were inferior to men and should remain subordinated to them, with marriage, children and housework being their main goals in life. They were discouraged from developing their creative talent, which Primo de Rivera denied: Women never discover anything. They lack creative talent, reserved by God for virile intellects. We can do no more than interpret what men present to us. Isabella I of Castile and Saint Teresa of Ávila served as Sección Femenina's inspirational models.

Historian Marie-Aline Barrachina has observed a contrast between the Falangist ideal of the Spanish woman and the Falangist ideal of the Falangist woman. While the Section praised the housewife and mother, lots of Section officers saw themselves as a vanguard, were single, had no children and worked outside home, sometimes confronting male peers. Unlike the religion-centered women of Acción Católica, female Falangists were political in their service of fascism. Historians debate this contrast between their preaching and their practice.

=== Women's sports ===
Sección Femenina also organized women's sports and promoted musical folklore. In 1963 it founded the Medina (in allusion to Medina del Campo) and CREFF (Colegios Reunidos de Educación Física Femenina) sports societies and created the first regular national women's leagues in Spain for sports such as basketball, handball and volleyball. While the leagues were not restricted to Medina and CREFF teams, they were mostly comprised by them; for instance, by 1973 the handball league was contested by the Medina sections in A Coruña, Castellón, Gipuzkoa, Málaga, Santander, Valencia (which would later become European champion BM Sagunto) and Zaragoza plus Atlético Madrid. However, by then the sports societies had become a severe financial strain for Sección Femenina and in 1974 the teams were told to find a sponsor. Most of them folded subsequently.

== History of Falange ==
=== Second Spanish Republic ===
The Franco regime banned all political parties and trade unions. The only permissible type organization was Falange, founded by José Antonio Primo de Rivera in 1933. Pilar Primo de Rivera headed the women's section, following its founding in 1933 as an auxiliary of the main organization. In this Second Republic period, both organizations had little popular support. It was not until the Civil War and the need for Francoist to have a vehicle for legitimacy that the party and its auxiliaries gained widespread support on the right.

Falange saw in this Second Republic and Civil War Period a threat from a variety of different actors to what it perceived as the traditional way of Spanish life that it sought to preserve. These actors included women who sought social and political liberation, and they were viewed by Falange as a threat to the established order of Spanish life.

Falange differed from other right wing nationalist groups at the time in that it had elements focused on social justice, and addressing the specific needs of the working classes. Among their goals was the nationalization of banks and public services, the creation of a workers syndicate, and the separation of church and state. This contrasted from other conservatives who sought to protect the financial assets of the elite.

One of the early problems for Sección Femenina was José Antonio used Falange to criticize the role of women in the Second Republic and to attack things like the law that allowed divorce but at the same time failed to articulate how right leaning women could act in support of the state he sought. The only clear position Falange offered was that women needed to be educated so that they could best serve the needs of the Spanish empire.

=== Spanish Civil War ===
By the start of the war in July 1936, Sección Femenina had 2,500 members nationwide organized into 18 different province based branches. The death of Jose Antonio at the hands of Republican forces in November 1936 left Pilar feeling empowered to carry on his work, claiming the need to finish what he had started. She took a firm hand to lead the Women's Section of Falange during the Spanish Civil War. Pilar would continue to head the organization for another 43 years after its 1934 founding.

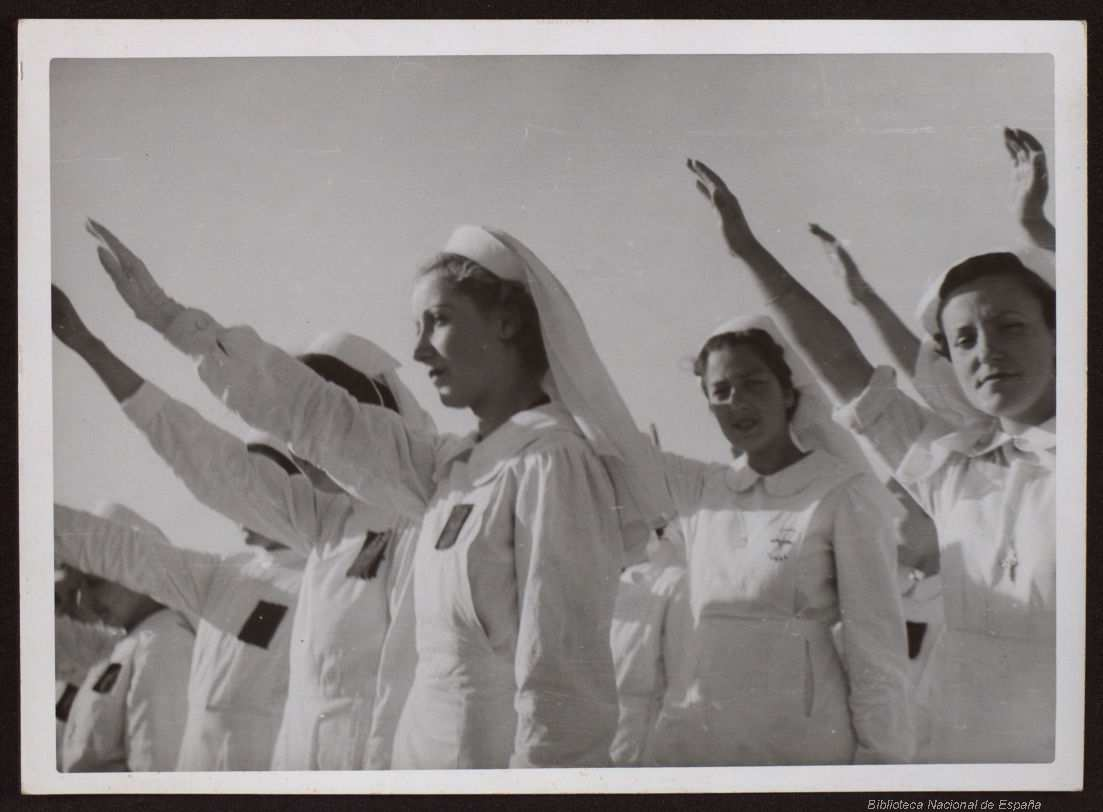
A group of nurses integrated into Sección Femenina's social assistance branch greet Francisco Franco with the Fascist salute during a massive act in Zaragoza, Spain, on 19 April 1938.

Margaritas served behind the front lines as nurses, which meant Sección Femenina had to find another visible role. They did this by serving as relief workers. While Pilar had been in Madrid when the war broke out and could not flee until October 1936, she moved to Salamanca where Nationalist coup supporters had proven more successful. Meanwhile, Sección Femenina established a provisional headquarters in Valladolid. During the war, women affiliated with Sección Femenina spread propaganda, sewed flags, visited Falangist prisoners in jail, supported families of prisoners and engaged in large scale fundraising activities in support of nationalist causes. Sección Femenina trained instructors and health practitioners, and in the process developed a number of strong female leaders. The organization also created territorial based sub-entities to implement their wider agenda of controlling women across Spain.

Sección Femenina held their first national conference in January 1937, which allowed for the organization for the first time to highlight their accomplishments with support from the Nationalist established Spanish state. By 1939, Sección Femenina had a membership of over 580,000 women nationwide.

== Political context ==
In July 1936, the Spanish Civil War started with a military coup attempt launched from the Spanish enclave of Melilla. In October of that same year, Franco took over as the Generalissimo and Chief of State in Nationalist zones. On 19 April 1937, Catholic and Falangist parties were merged, making Falange Española Tradicionalista the official state party behind Nationalist lines. On 30 January 1938, the first National State Cabinet meeting was held, with the Spanish Civil War formally coming to an end on 1 April 1939 and an official government formalized on 8 August 1939.

The Franco regime banned alternative political parties and trade unions. The only permissible political organization was Falange. During the Franco regime, membership in the Women's Section was a requirement for all women. A referendum was held in 1966, where people were given the option to affirm or deny the organization of the state. With massive support, Franco was affirmed as Head of State. Prince Juan Carlos was appointed as Franco's official successor in 1970, with Admiral Luis Carrero Blanco being the unofficial successor. Carrero Blanco was assassinated in 1973 by ETA. Franco died in November 1975.

== Organization ==
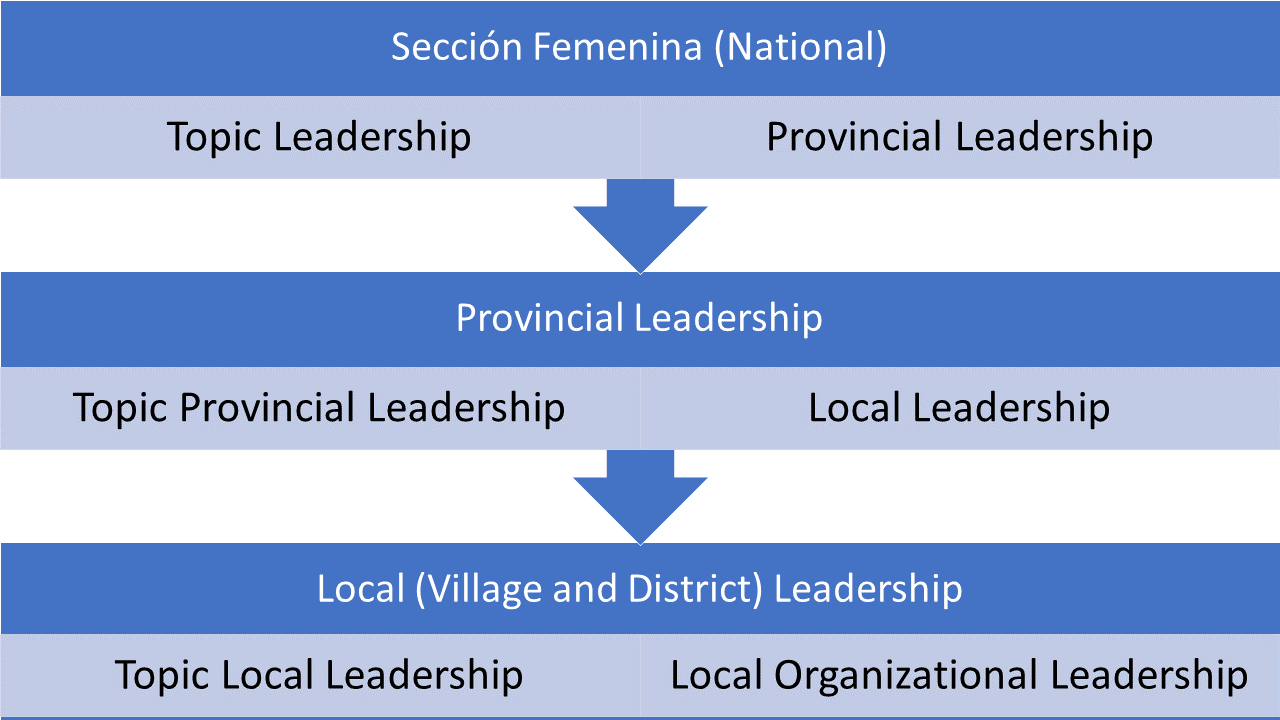
Sección Femenina Organizational Structure.

The Women's Section closely mirrored the strict hierarchical structure of Falange, which allowed it to be easily subverted into Franco's regime by controlling the people at the top of its institutional ladder. The structure followed the male structure, and was established during the Civil War. The national organization appointed provincial leaders, who would in return report back on the needs of their area. These leaders in turn would report provisional leaders to deal with specific areas and to appoint local leaders on a village or district level. They would in turn appoint leaders to deal with specific areas on the village or district level.

With victory appearing imminent, in the waning days of the Spanish Civil War, Sección Femenina started training provincial leaders known as mandos, mandos políticos and mandos de servicio in at a school in Málaga. The end of the war saw the reality that leaders trained in political ideology of the new regime were required. While mandos were a function of leadership in Second Republic and Civil War Sección Femenina, mandos políticos did not feature until the Franco regime. Mandos políticos and mandos de servicio would largely work on the local level to ensure ideological compliance.

Sección Femenina always explicitly supported patriarchy in Spain through its continual deferral to Franco's fascist ideology, the Roman Catholic Church and male political apparatus. Despite this, the organizations impact in defining the roles of girls and women also helped inform the role of boys and men in Spain.

== Post-war activity ==
Sección Femenina played an important role in Francoist Spain in subjugating women by creating a narrative for women to internalize that involved women being inferior to men. Gender norms were reinforced the organization. The Women's Section found itself facing challenges in the early part of Francoist Spain as Falange had no specified ideology for the role of women. The main consideration was that they not challenge the role of men, nor the concept that husbands were the head of the household or that they competed economically with men. Consequently, the Women's Section of Falange focused on supporting and refining women's domestic contributions. They taught women that their primary expertise was in housekeeping, childcare, traditional crafts, and small-scale agricultural production. The focus on some of these small scale economic activities played an important role in stabilizing Spain in the post War period. Among women in leadership in the organization, they would insult and attack each other by accusing other women of being feminists.

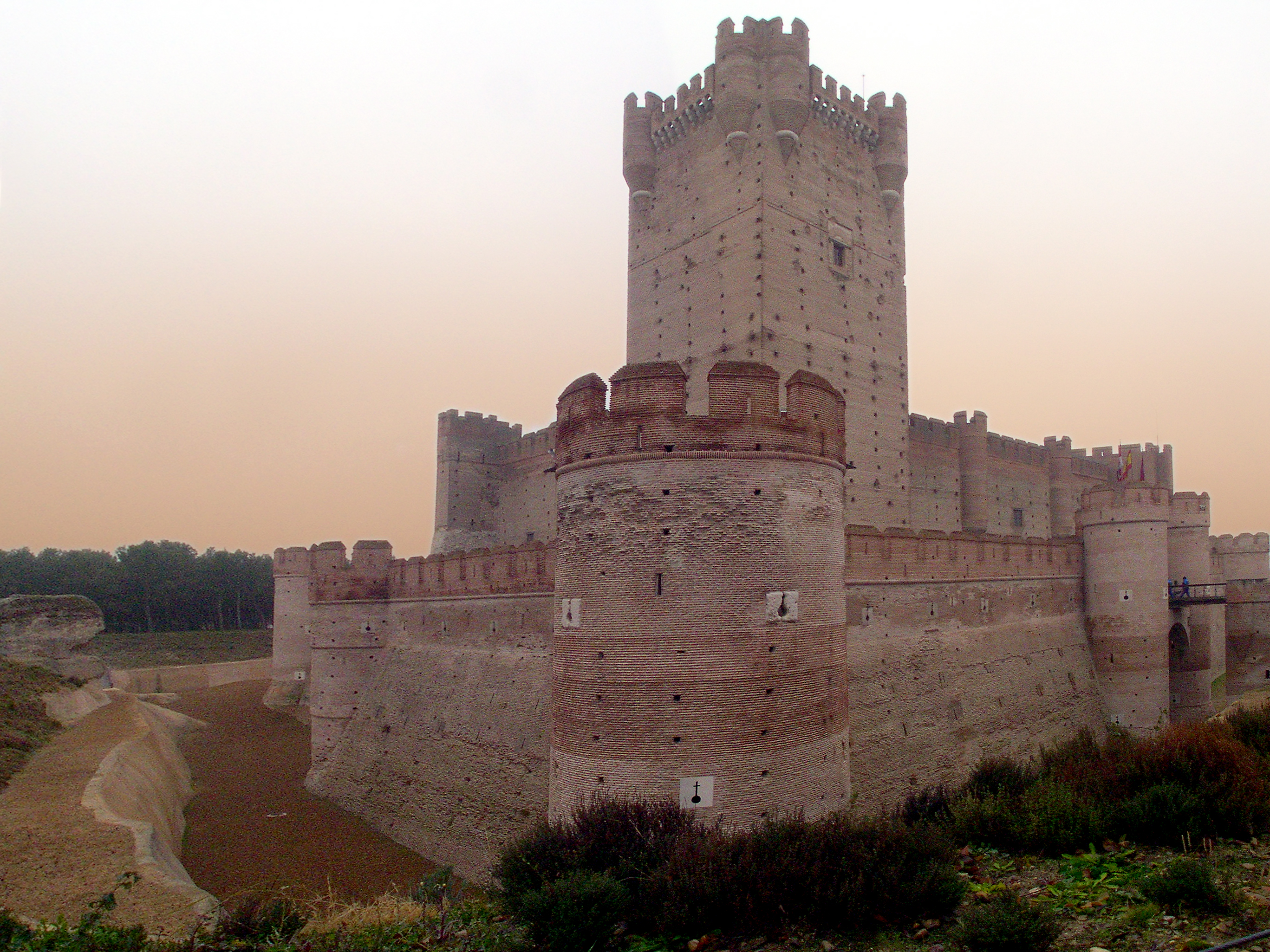
Panoramic view of the Castle of La Mota.

The castillo de la Mota in Medina del Campo was the center of the Escuela Superior de Formación de la Sección Femenina in the Francoist period. Inside, women and teenaged girls were trained to become Falangist leaders in defense of the Spanish family. Lessons were given on hygiene, embroidery, cooking, singing of patriotic hymns, and saying of prayers. In May 1939, Pilar Primo de Rivera organized a festival at La Mota castle in Medina del Campo which was attended by 10,000 girls and young women. With Franco in attendance, Pilar asked that the castle be used as the seat of Sección Femenina and reforms were then started later that year to repurpose it for the organization's needs. Sección Femenina also was involved in spiritual training and in creating a spiritual identity for its members. Unlike conservatives outside Falange, Sección Femenina was unique in teaching women that they had individual potential and were not passive observers in their own lives. Their ideology, steeped in Catholicism, predated similar reforms in the Church implemented as a result of the Second Vatican Council.

Women needed to complete Sección Femenina's Servicio Social program in order to get a passport, drivers license, join an association or obtain educational titles. It could be completed by engaging in service activities at children's canteens, workshops, hospitals, and by engaging in physical activity like gymnastics or approved women's sports. Working-class women were supported by being invited to participate in syndicalist committees, and by the Women's Section constantly highlighting that for many poor women, it was a necessary evil that women should leave their homes to work and that such work was still secondary to marriage and motherhood.

A 1944 edition of Semanario de la SF said, "The life of every woman, despite what she may pretend, is nothing but a continuous desire to find somebody to whom she can succumb. Voluntary dependency, the offering of every minute, every desire and illusion is the most beautiful thing, because it implies the cleaning away of all the bad germs - vanity, selfishness, frivolity - by love."

Starting in May 1946, Sección Femenina, in conjunction with their magazine Ventanal, began an hour long Monday night weekly radio program that focused on women's writers. Their first interview was with Rosa María Cajal. They would also interview Blanca Espinar, Dolores Pérez Camarero, María José Pomar, Carmen Martín de la Escalara and María Antonia Morales. Despite their intention of promoting women's writers, most of their interviews and commentary were often in support of state goals, namely in reinforcing women as being passive with their primary role being wives and mothers, not writers.

The 1950s saw a diminishment of the importance of the Women's Section as their role in shoring up the economy and producing propaganda for national unity were less needed. In response, it switched to become more clearly a social welfare arm of the state. The organization lost much of its political influence and position within the Francoist structure. Its survival was largely because of their involvement in education and no other organization offered women of this period the same level of opportunities. Sección Femenina played a critical role in advancing changes to the 1955 Ley de Régimen Local about the role of married women in 1968. Consequently, married women were allowed to vote and run in local elections. Female salaried work and higher education were allowed while giving priority to their home role.

During the 1960s and 1970s, the Women's Section aided in raising expectations of what was possible for women to accomplish by taking personal responsibility for their actions. Sección Femenina was formally dissolved in 1977, two years after the death of Franco.

Sección Femenina had been trying to organize the Congreso Internacional de la Mujer since 1967. Their initial efforts were delayed several years, including for budget reasons in 1969. The congress was finally held in 1970 from 7–14 June in Madrid. 900 people from 44 countries attended. This conference would play an important role in the establishing of the United Nations Year of the Woman in 1975. People and groups Federation Internationale des Femmes des Carrières Juridiques, founder María Telo, Universidad de Madrid sociologist and professor María Ángeles Durán, María Moliner and María del Campo Alange, the Associations of Housewives and Italian historian Giulia Gadaleta. Most came as individuals, not as official representatives of different organizations. This was because many participants were hesitant to have their organizations being seen as supporting an organization, Sección Femenina, that they considered retrograde when it came to women's rights. Despite many attendees thinking abortion, divorce and contraceptive were important to understanding the situation of Spanish women, these topics were largely out of bounds because of Sección Femenina's positions on them. Sección Femenina tried to drive working groups to discuss the needs of children and how to incorporate women into public life.

The intention to organize the International Year of Women was announced by the United Nations in 1972. Sección Femenina then launched a political campaign to be the point organization for United Nation plans around women. In the absence of any other organization capable of doing this, the government agreed and published their decision in Decreto 950/1974. The regime followed this with statements about plans to reform or eliminate laws that incapacitated women.

In dealing with the evolving problems of women, President of Government Arias Navarro said in 1974 ahead of the International Year of the Woman, that Spain needed a "genuine and profitable Spanish feminism", a feminism that had Spanish origins and was free of foreign influence. It should not come from "communities of traditions well differentiated to ours or that are in a very different state of development". Navarro was likely indicating support for Sección Femenina, and not for other qualified Spanish feminists of the period like Mercedes Formica and María Ángeles Durán.

== Education ==
One of the goals of the Women's Section was to use fascist ideology about the role of women and Falange's teachings in a woman's individual agency to attract leftist women who were seeking to enjoy some semblance of the freedoms they had enjoyed during the 1920s and 1930s. They did this in part through educational efforts and providing a political outlet. The group also published a monthly magazine entitled Consigna to achieve its educational goals.

The Women's Section continued to build schools in the post-war period. Pilar, serving as a link between her brother and Falangist originalism, ensured the organization's survival even as it lost some of its early impetus and grew exceptionally in size. Opportunities to work, study or travel required taking classes on cooking, sewing, childcare and the role of women before they were granted. If women did not take or pass these classes, they were denied these opportunities.

The Women's Section promoted the idea that the only people who could educate Spain's youngsters. The impact of this was that Sección Femenina encouraged women into secondary and university education so they could impart knowledge to the next generation. This could become problematic at times as there was a fine line in Falangist thinking between seeking education for practical reasons and seeking knowledge for the sake of knowledge in the vein of Second Republic feminists.

Pilar Primo de Rivera attended the 1943 National Council of Spanish Education Service as the leader of the Women's Section. While an influential leader at the first edition of the National Council, she took pains to make sure her rhetoric was that which indicated a subordinate role because she was a woman. She said of women's education at the conference, "In regard to the role of women in the Party, we should unilaterally consider the condition of woman, and as a secondary thing her profession, work, etcetera, because even if she is a good worker, a good student, or a good teacher, principally, she is a woman, with a determined goal to accomplish, that, sometimes, accidentally, brings her to the University and to the workplace." She continued, arguing that women had never offered anything as they lacked intelligence and creativity, that they never discovered anything, and that they needed guidance from men to interpret information.
