= José María Valiente Soriano =

Spanish politician

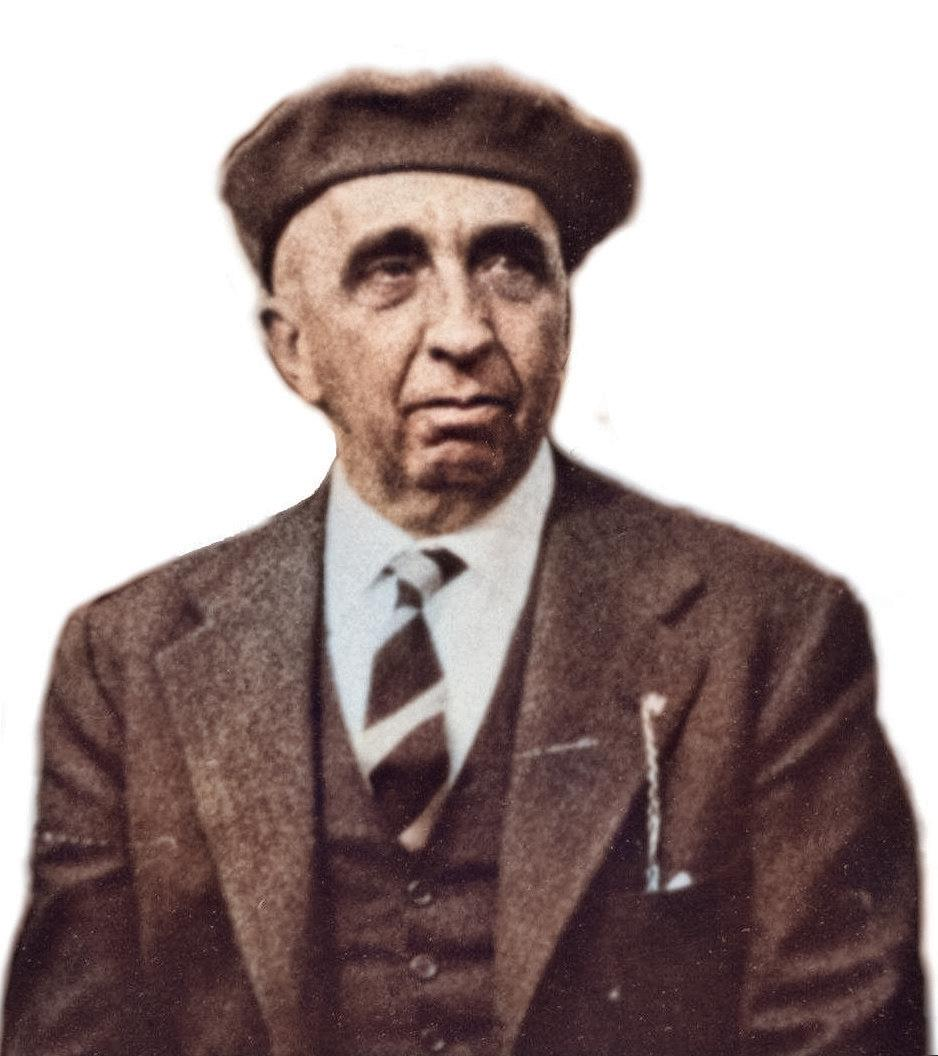
- Born: José María Valiente Soriano; 1900; Chelva, Spain
- Died: 1982; Valdecilla, Spain
- Occupations: Lawyer, politician
- Known for: Politician
- Political party: AP, CEDA, CT, UNE, DDE

José María Valiente Soriano (1900-1982) was a Spanish politician. He commenced his career in Acción Nacional and gained recognition as leader of Juventudes de Acción Popular, the youth branch of CEDA. In 1935 he joined Carlism; his political climax fell on the period of 1955-1967, when he was leading the mainstream Traditionalist organisation. After 1971 he unsuccessfully engaged in buildup of conservative monarchist groupings. He served in the Republican parliament during two terms between 1933 and 1936; between 1967 and 1977 during two terms he held a mandate in the Francoist Cortes. In 1937-1942 he was member of Consejo Nacional of Falange Española Tradicionalista.

== Family and youth ==
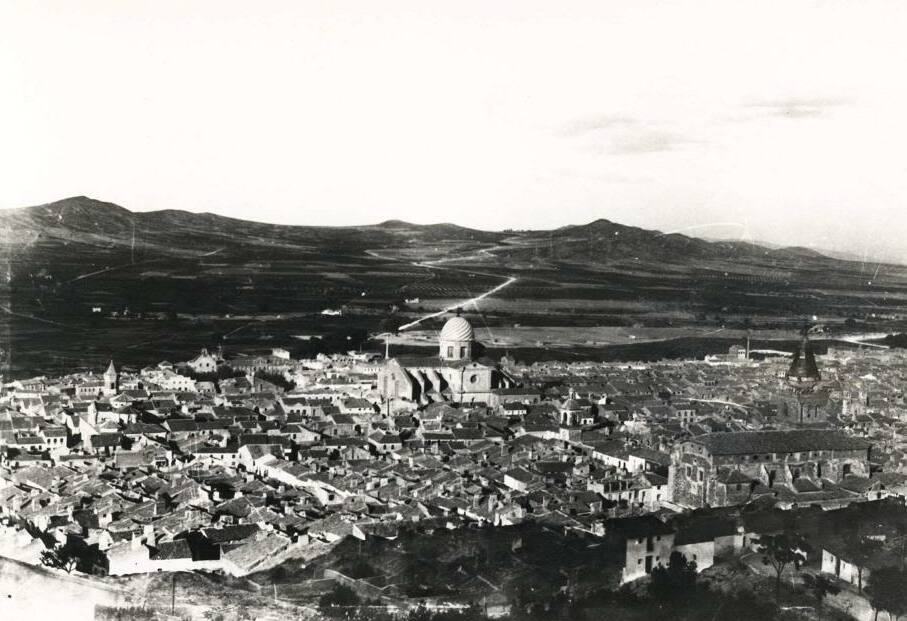
Yecla, early 20th c.

None of the sources consulted provides information on Valiente's distant ancestors; it is known that his paternal grandfather José Valiente was related to a Murcian town of Yecla, but it is not known what he was doing for a living. His son and Valiente's father, also José Valiente (died 1938), in the late 1870s frequented the local Yeclan Colegio de los Padres Escolapios, and obtained “bachillerato de arte” in 1881. He then studied law at an unspecified university and at least since the mid-1890s served as a notary in Yecla. He married Micaela Soriano e Ibáñez; nothing is known either about her or her family except that her parents were also the natives of Yecla. The couple had 3 children; José Maria was only son. They initially settled in the Valencian town of Chelva, where Valiente served as a notary. In 1900 the family moved to Valencia, where Valiente was admitted to the local notary corps. He served in the Levantine capital for some 20 years; in 1920 or 1921 he moved to Madrid and kept practicing as a notary.

The young José María was brought up in Valencia; in the mid-1910s he was frequenting the local Colegio de San José, run by the Jesuits, and was doing well; in 1917 he obtained bachillerato at Instituto de Valencia. Following preparatory courses in Murcia he then enrolled at law in Universidad Central in Madrid and followed the licenciatura curriculum between 1917 and 1921. Sometime in the early 1920s Valiente Soriano moved to Italy to pursue his academic career in Università di Bologna, where in 1923 he passed the Esame di Laurea in Giurisprudenza. It is not clear whether back in Spain Valiente was further related to Universidad Central, as he got his title of licenciado en derecho confirmed by the Madrid alma mater in 1927. In the late 1920s he commenced work as auxiliary professor at Central; at the same time he practiced as abogado.

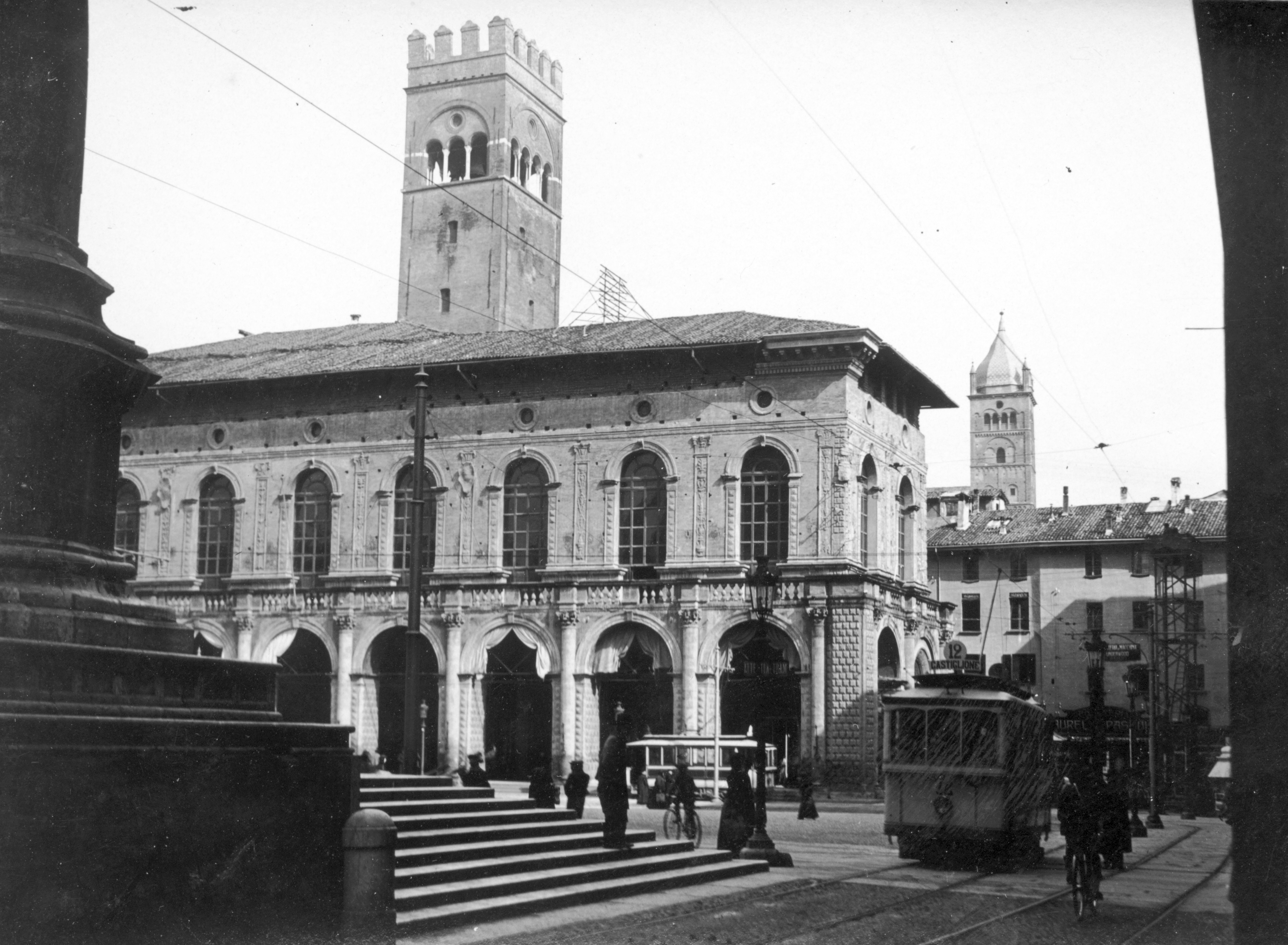
Bologna, 1920s

In 1933 Valiente married a girl from Santander, Consuelo Setién Rodríguez (died 1986); she was descendant to a family of noble Cantabrian landowners and would later claim the title of Marqués de Pelayo. The couple settled in Madrid at calle General Castaños 4 and had at least 3 children, born in the 1930s; Lucía, Rosa Blanca and José Ignacio Valiente Setién. None of them became a public figure, which is also the case of Valiente's grandchildren. Among other relatives the best known is his nephew Alfredo Prieto Valiente, who was an important Asturian politician and in the years of 1977-1979 served as the Unión de Centro Democrático deputy to the Constituent Cortes. One more Valiente's sister married into the aristocratic Toll-Messia family and his another nephew, Fernando Toll-Messia y Valiente, was the XIII. Conde de Cazalla del Río.

== In Christian organizations (1924-1935) ==
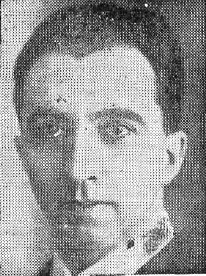
young Valiente

In his youth Valiente's father was a liberal, though in the 1920s he moved to more conservative positions and supported the Primo de Rivera dictatorship. The first information on Valiente Soriano's political engagements comes from 1922: he entered the Madrid branch of Confederación Nacional de Estudiantes Católicos. In 1924 and jointly with Gil Robles he co-founded Vanguardia Social Popular, designed as a youth branch of Partido Social Popular. In 1927, Valiente set up Juventud Católica de España, the ostensibly apolitical grouping concerned with defence and dissemination of Catholic values among the youth; in 1931 it was federated with Acción Católica, a broad organization of lay Catholics led by Ángel Herrera Oria. Later the same year, once the militantly secular course of the Republic began to take shape, he moved to politics by co-founding Acción Nacional (which in 1932 changed its name to Acción Popular), a broad though heterogeneous conservative alliance, and became the vicepresident of its first National Committee. Since Acción Catolica banned its members from holding political party leadership roles, Valiente had to resign from the JCE leadership.

In 1933, Valiente proceeded to build the Acción Popular youth organisation, Juventudes de Acción Popular, and became its president. Soon afterwards AP transformed itself into Confederación Española de Derechas Autónomas. JAP, now forming a juvenile branch of CEDA, retained its name and structure; Valiente continued to lead the organisation and became one of the national CEDA chieftains. Under his guidance, Juventudes became an aggressively anti-Lefist and pro-authoritarian group, though falling short of a typical "shirt organization" and denying similarity to Fascism. During the 1933 elections to the Cortes, Valiente, thanks to his Cantabrian family links, negotiated a place on the local Unión de Derechas Agrarias list of candidates and was comfortably elected from the Santander-Cantabria district.

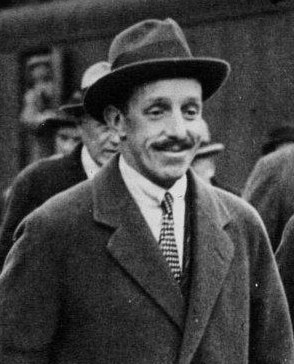
Alfonso XIII

In early 1934, Valiente at least twice secretly travelled to France to speak with Alfonso XIII. His aim was to negotiate the terms of modus vivendi between the monarchists and CEDA, and specifically to ask that for the deposed king refrains from any statements that might impair CEDA's political fortunes. It is not exactly clear to what extent this mission was agreed with the party leader José Gil-Robles, since the two gave conflicting accounts of the incident, but it is usually accepted that the latter was at least approvingly aware. When the news of the Fontainebleau talks leaked to the press CEDA, the party which despite repeated declarations of loyalty towards the Republic was customarily accused of anti-Republican designs by the Left, found itself cornered and embarrassed. Eventually, the official version adopted by CEDA presented the incident as a monarchist plot within the organization. Valiente, apparently with his consent, was made a scapegoat and was expelled from the party. It is not unlikely that the militancy of JAP, perceived by the more acquiescent cedistas as compromising, might have contributed to the harsh line taken against Valiente. He had to leave JAP as well, replaced as its leader by José María Perez de Laborda.

== Carlist: Republic and War (1935-1939) ==
Carlist standard

In late 1935, amid a blaze of publicity, Valiente decided to join Comunión Tradicionalista. For the Carlists, he was a valuable acquisition. The JAP militancy and the monarchist episode, embarrassing to the loyalist CEDA, were welcome credentials for the Traditionalists, who made little secret of their intention to do away with the godless regime as soon as possible. From this moment he became a vehement critic of CEDA, indulging in invectives against his former party mates. During the 1936 elections to the Cortes, he ran on the Carlist ticket from the rather conservative Burgos constituency and was elected. He was not noted as a particularly active deputy; his focus was rather on propaganda. His already notable standing on the national political scene was demonstrated when Valiente carried the coffin at the funeral of José Calvo Sotelo.

During the anti-Republican conspiracy, Valiente's role was reduced to negotiations with the would-be Alfonsist allies in the Burgos province, where he resided during the coup of July 18. He became member of the Carlist wartime executive Junta Nacional Carlista de Guerra, where as member of Seccion Administrativa he took care of religious affairs. When Franco expulsed the Carlist leader Manuel Fal Conde from Spain, Valiente acted as his informal substitute. In 1937, facing Franco's pressure to unite the Carlists and Falange, he took part in two crucial meetings of the Carlist executive, in February in Insua and in March in Burgos. Initially he seemed to have been among hardline falcondistas, but later tended to cautious endorsement of compliance and engaged in talks on details of the merger, apparently in hope that some genuine understanding might be achieved.

Falangist standard

When Unification Decree was made public Valiente resigned his post as secretary of the Junta; he admitted that the merger conflicted with his feelings and that "there is no moral unity" between the merged parties, but argued that given the circumstances, it had to be accepted. In May 1937 he was among 9 Carlists nominated to provincial FET jefaturas when made the party leader in Burgos; in October as one of 11 Carlists he entered the 50-member Consejo Nacional of the new organization (though not the Junta Politica). More than amalgamation within a motley grouping artificially created by the military, he feared the breakup of Carlism. Having personal authorisation of the regent-claimant Don Javier, Valiente remained in the Falangist Consejo Nacional, but he refused the offer of Rodezno, who assumed the Ministry of Justice in the first Francoist cabinet of 1938 and asked Valiente to be his sub-secretary (the post went to Luis Arellano instead). As member of Consejo Valiente was bombarded with letters of protest and requests for assistance on part of the Carlists who complained about Falangist domination, marginalisation of Traditionalism and personal persecutions; however, there was almost nothing he could have done about it.

== Early Francoism (1939-1955) ==
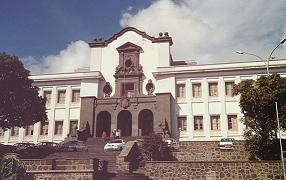
Universidad de la Laguna, Tenerife

In 1939 Franco re-appointed Valiente to the new, 2nd Falangist Consejo Nacional. However, in the early 1940s his official Francoist engagements were getting terminated; at unspecified time he ceased as the FET provincial jefe in Burgos, and in 1942 he was not appointed to the 3rd Falangist Consejo Nacional. Save for some religious engagements, the press ceased to mention his name. In the early 1940s Valiente decided to re-launch his academic career and served as auxiliar temporal at the Law Faculty in Madrid. In 1942 he entered the selection process for the post of chair of Civil Law and in 1943 was nominated catedrático numerario in the Universidad de La Laguna in the Canary Islands. In early 1946 he applied for transfer to the parallel position in Universidad de Sevilla; however, when admitted he agreed a swop with Miguel Royo Martínez from Zaragoza. He moved to Aragón, but did not complete the full annual academic cycle. In 1947 Valiente requested unpaid leave. The same year he vacated the post, though formally he remained related to the Zaragoza University; he went on practicing as a lawyer.

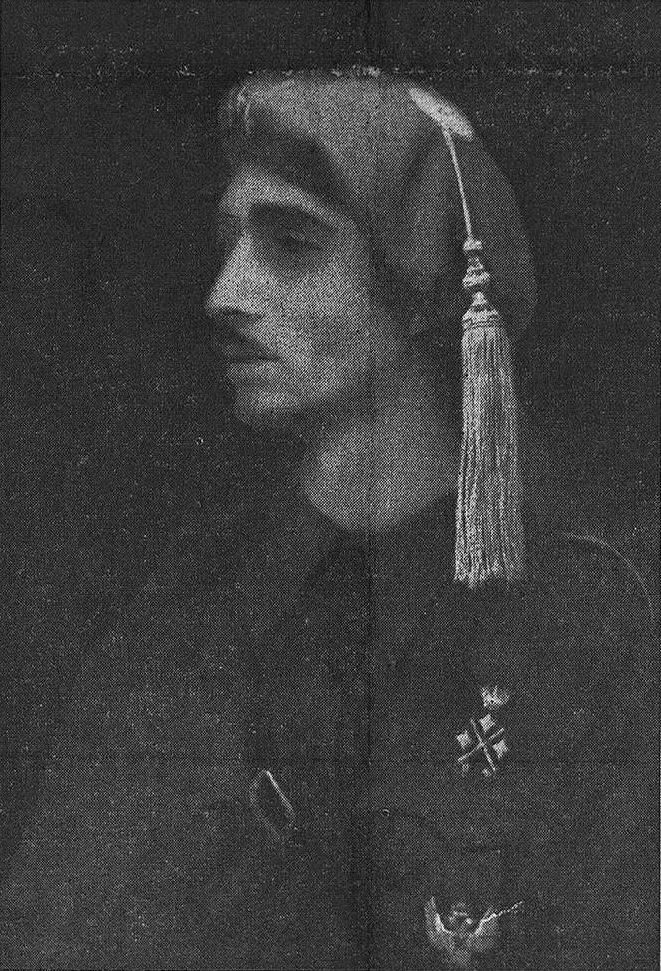
Don Javier in Carlist gear, propaganda postcard

Until 1942, when Franco ignored Don Javier's proposal of forming a Carlist-Francoist government, Valiente seemed to hope for a compromise. In 1939 he co-signed Manifestación de los Ideales, a documented addressed to Franco which urged implementation of Traditionalist features; in 1943 he co-signed another one, Reclamación de Poder, this time explicitly referring to instauration of the traditionalist monarchy. In 1945 he attended a grand Carlist anti-Francoist demonstration in Pamplona and delivered an address from the balcony; afterwards he was detained by security and expected facing the firing squad; eventually the sanctions adopted were relatively mild, especially compared to the terror employed against the Left. As one of the key mid-age Carlist followers of Don Javier and his Jefe Delegado Fal Conde, Valiente was courted by Conde Rodezno. The latter invited him to join the juanistas, the group notionally loyal to the regency, but pressing the candidacy of Don Juan, the Alfonsist claimant, as the prospective Carlist king. Valiente refused to adhere.

In 1947 Valiente took part in the informal meeting of the Carlist executive, the first one since 1937; he was nominated vice-president of re-established Carlist Consejo Nacional, effectively the second-in-command within the organization. Highly skeptical about any would-be dynastical agreement Valiente remained loyal to Don Javier; in 1951 he welcomed the claimant in his Madrid home. However, he became somewhat less enthusiastic in 1952, when Don Javier made declarations generally understood as termination of the regency and assumption of his own claim to the throne. Since the early 1950s at meetings of the Carlist command layer Valiente started to make references about "new political situation", thought to be hints about the need to seek rapprochement with the regime. Together with Jose Maria Arauz de Robles and Jose Luis Zamanillo, within Carlism he was soon getting perceived as an advocate of "tendencia colaboracionista".

== Leader: ascent (1955-1963) ==
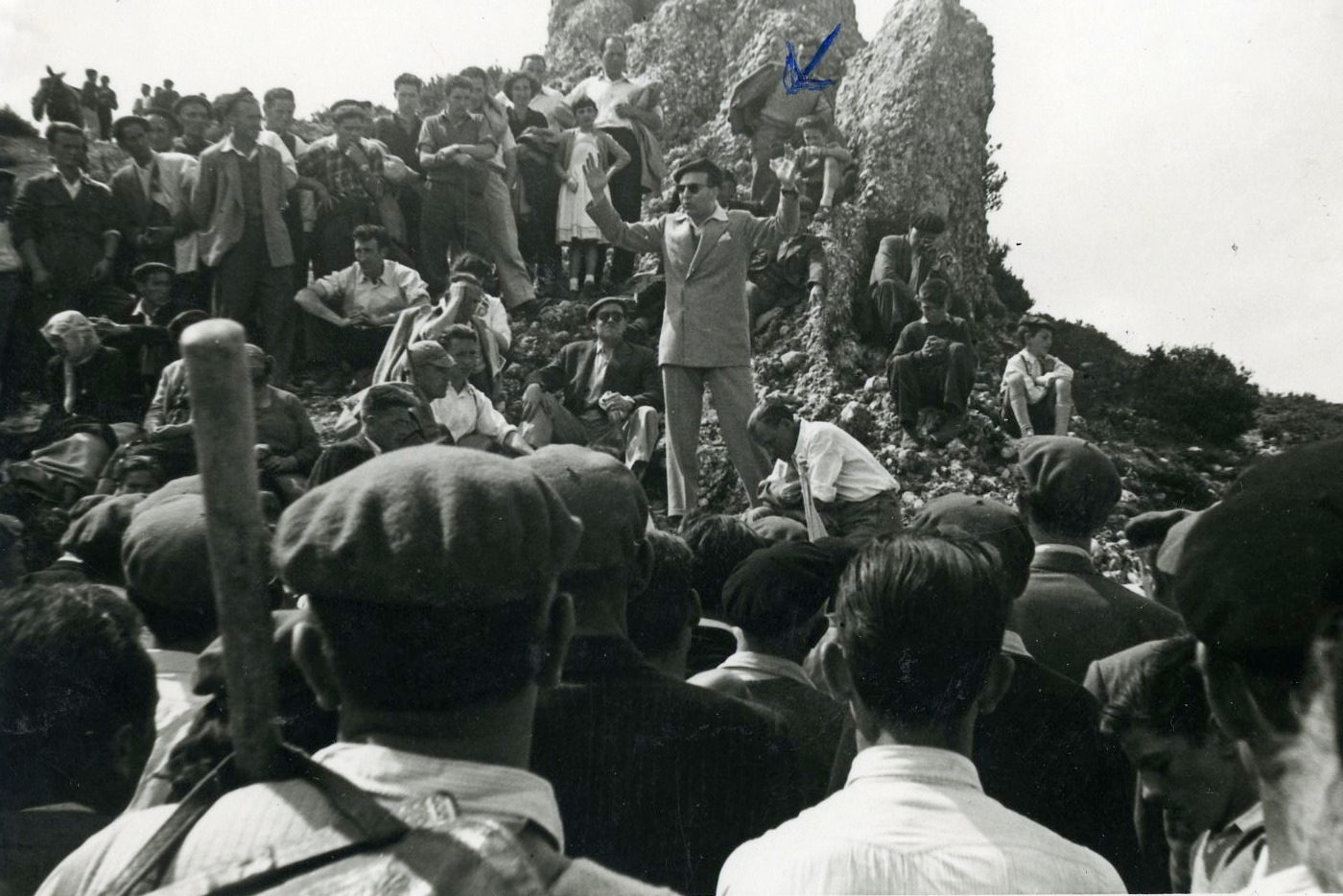
Montejurra rally, mid-1950s

Around the mid-1950s, the growing feeling among the javieristas was that the intransigent opposition, pursued by Manuel Fal Conde, produced few if any results. Don Javier seemed to agree. Following the resignation of Fal Conde, in 1955 he created Secretariado General, a new collegial governing body of the movement, naming Valiente its provisional president. Consistently opposing the plans of monarchical union, pursued by José María Arauz de Robles, Valiente engineered a more collaborative approach towards Francoism. The time seemed particularly opportune in 1957, when totalitarian plans of the Falangist leader José Arrese were rejected by Franco; the dictator started to make references to Traditionalism and to movimiento-comunión. The law on Principios Fundamentales del Movimiento, adopted in 1958, declared Spain to be a Monarquía Tradicional.

The new strategy of posibilismo was welcomed with mixed feelings among the Carlists; older regional junteros grumbled and a young Navarrese, disguised as a priest, assaulted Valiente in a Pamplona street. His key ally against the internal opposition turned out to be the son of Don Javier, Carlos Hugo, who made a fulminant Príncipe de Asturias entry at the 1957 annual Carlist Montejurra amassment. The prince, greeted with exploding enthusiasm of the youth, delivered his La Proclama de Montejurra which, apart from social novelties, presaged modernization of the party and a more activist policy; it might have been interpreted as an offer to Franco. However, this in turn triggered two secessions, which Valiente was not able to prevent; in 1957 so-called Estorilos declared Don Juan the legitimate Carlist heir, and in 1958 the anti-Francoist intransigents created a splinter faction named RENACE.

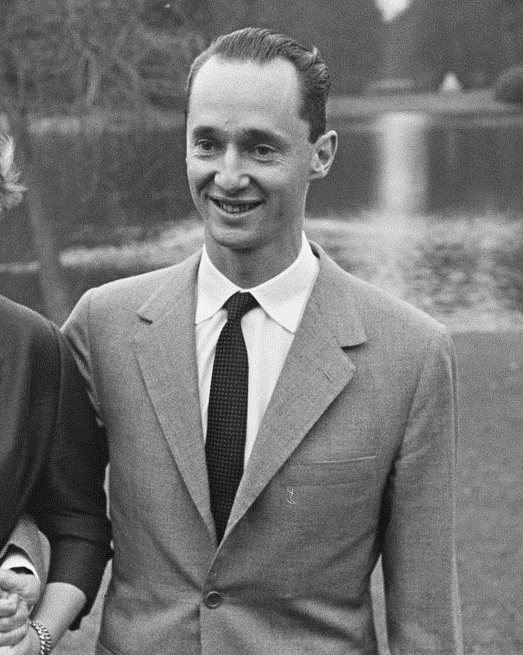
Don Carlos Hugo, early 1960s

Valiente enjoyed full confidence of the claimant and in late 1960 his position within the organisation was enhanced; he was nominated Jefe Delegado, the position vacant since Fal's resignation in 1955. However, his single-handed leadership was relatively brief. In early 1962 Carlos Hugo moved permanently from France to Madrid and set up Secretaría Política, a team of his young collaborators, led by Ramón Massó. Their cooperation with Valiente went well, even though the prince enforced restructuring of the party command layer and introduced new internal regulations; they shifted some power from jefe delegado to personal entourage of the prince.

Initially the rapprochement with the regime, masterminded by Valiente and the Massó, looked promising. The socially radical Falangist leaders, José Solís Ruiz and Raimundo Fernández-Cuesta, started to frequent Carlist rallies. During formation of the new Cortes in 1961 Franco followed Valiente's advice and nominated all the individuals suggested. The regime permitted opening of Círculos Culturales Vázquez de Mella, a network of semi-official Carlist offices, and authorized a few new Carlist periodicals; some of them, like Montejurra, gained popularity and became vehicles of mobilization especially among the youth. Valiente had long audiences with Franco in 1961 and 1962; the dictator declared that he had not decided on his successor and the future monarch yet, and explicitly invited the Carlists to lobby for their cause. Carlos Hugo was personally admitted by Caudillo later in 1962.

== Leader: descent (1963-1968) ==
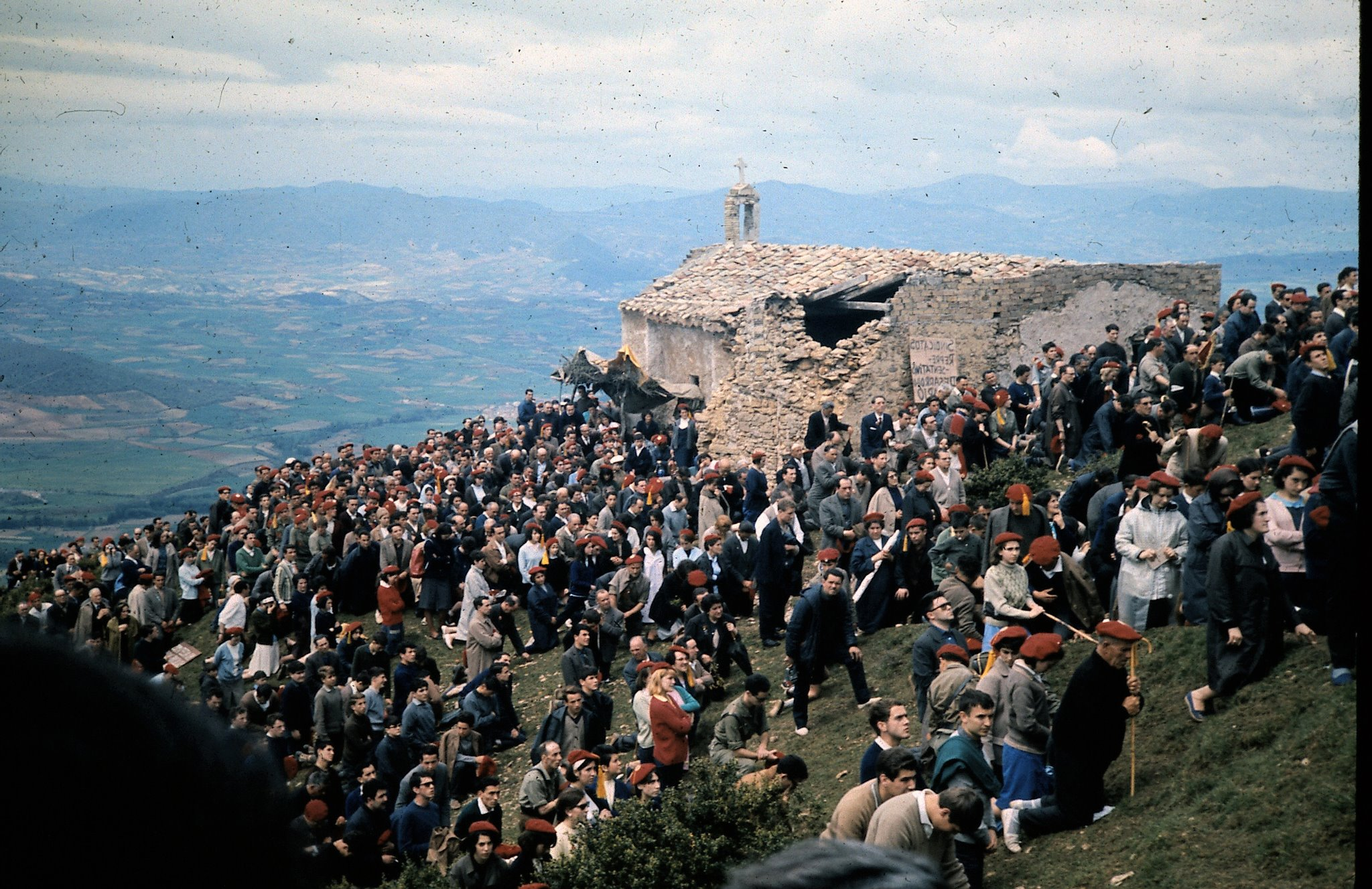
Montejurra rally, 1960s

Valiente, dubbed "the strong man of Carlism", in the early 1960s had to share more and more power with Don Carlos Hugo and his team. Following setup of Secretaría Política in 1962, other new bodies mushroomed and diluted the powers of jefe delegado, with Masso and José Maria Zavala emerging as dynamic new leaders. The closest Valiente's collaborators, Jose Luis Zamanillo and Juan Sáenz-Díez, were getting increasingly marginalized. What started to amount to an open friction was not merely a personalist squabble; Zamanillo and Traditionalist theorists like Francisco Elias de Tejada were alarmed by ambiguous, socially-driven rhetoric of the carlohuguistas. The conflict climaxed in 1963, when Zamanillo was expulsed, Sáenz-Díez was demoted from treasury, while intellectuals related to the Siempre magazine, like Elias de Tejada and Rafael Gambra, distanced themselves from the organization. Valiente, also somewhat uneasy about new ideas advanced by the prince, eventually consented to the measures adopted; he was guided by loyalty to the king. However, the showdown left him increasingly isolated in the Carlist executive, now dominated by the progressist youth.

In the mid-1960s it became clear that the strategy of posibilismo, which initially produced some results, was not leading any further. Censorship imposed almost total media blackout on the 1964 wedding of Don Carlos Hugo, who was also denied the Spanish citizenship; no ministerial nominations materialized. In 1965 Valiente was again admitted by Franco; during the conversation he realized that collaboration has reached its limits, that no more concessions could be expected and that the crowning of Don Carlos Hugo was not even a distant perspective. Presence of prince Juan Carlos at the honorary tribune during the 1965 Victory Day parade made it clear that Franco was leaning towards the Alfonsist dynastical solution.

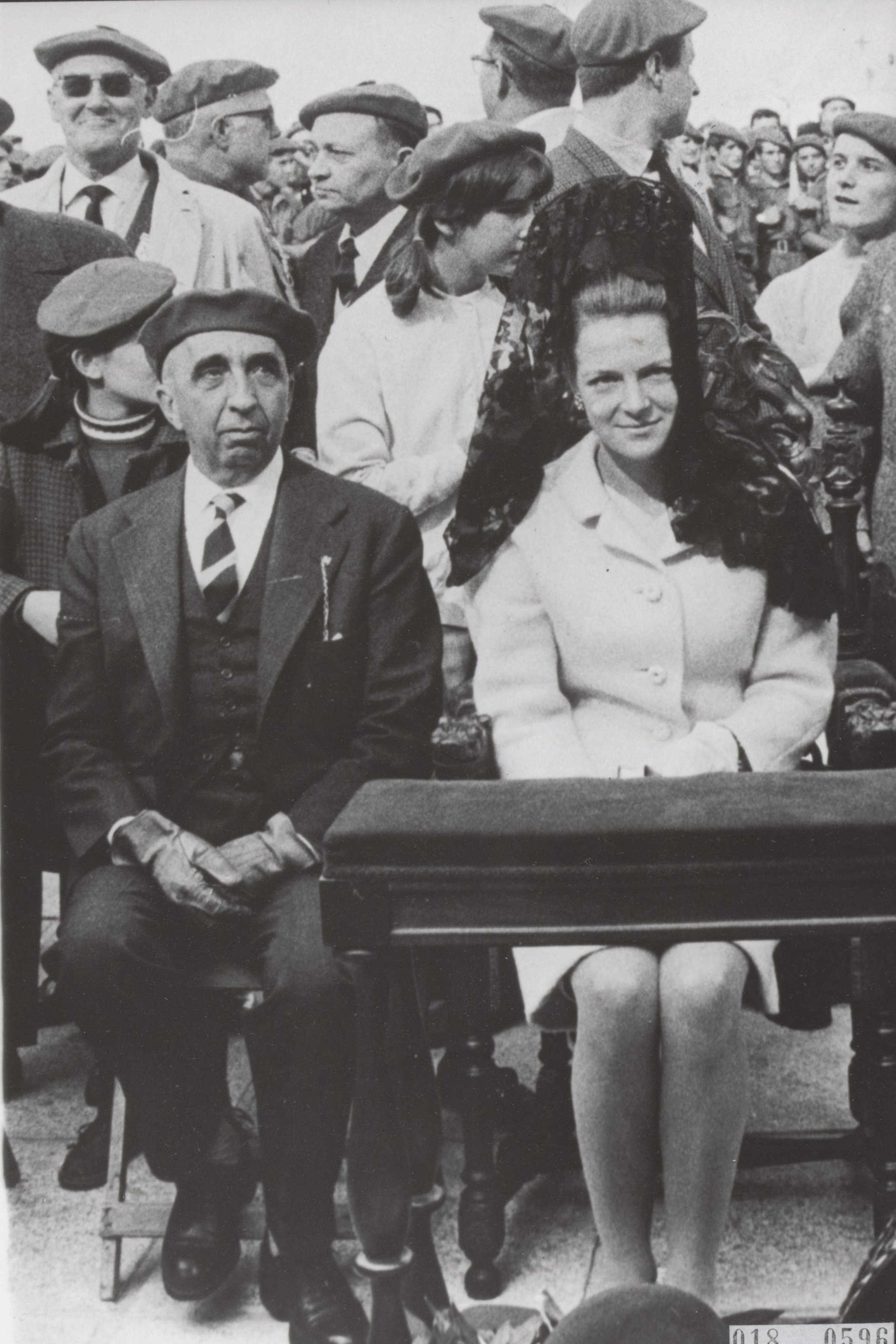
with princess Irene, Madrid 1967

The carlohuguistas also realized that the Valiente-sponsored posibilismo has crashed. Their social radicalism was losing its pro-Falangist tone and was taking an increasingly Marxist turn instead. Valiente, isolated in the executive, was not in position to prevent it, especially that the new wave or reorganisation left the party management in hands of Zavala and his team. At the time, the carlohuguistas already controlled the Carlist student organization Agrupación Escolar Tradicionalista (AET) and the trade-unionist Movimiento Obrero Tradicionalista (MOT). In 1966-1967 the Traditionalist old guard were effectively sidelined into decorative bodies. Valiente was bombarded with alarm messages which denounced subversive revolutionary infiltration of Carlism; however, guided by loyalty to the king, which seemed to have endorsed the course advanced by his son, and judging the charges as exaggerated, he did not mount firm opposition. Increasingly bewildered, isolated, in disagreement with the course promoted by the prince and consumed by tension, he tried to hand his resignation as jefe delegado; it was eventually accepted by Don Javier in late 1967 and made public in early 1968.

== Last years (1968-1982) ==
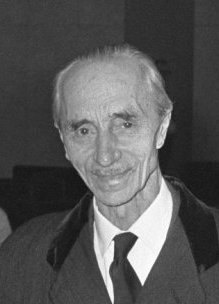
Don Javier, 1970

Few weeks before getting his resignation accepted, in late 1967 Valiente was nominated to the Cortes, hand-picked by Franco from the pool of his personal appointees. The exact mechanism of the nomination is not clear, though as master of his trademark balancing game the dictator might have intended to play Valiente against Don Carlos Hugo. It is neither clear whether his resignation from jefatura delegada and his appointment to the Cortes were interrelated. Valiente accepted the nomination and in a letter to Don Javier he pledged to continue working for the Carlist cause. In 1968-1969 his relations with the claimant remained cordial, though impaired by health problems of both politicians. It changed when in 1970 Valiente was re-appointed to the Cortes, again as Franco's personal appointee; in an effusive acceptance letter Valiente thanked the dictator and declared that "estoy y quiero estar siempre con Vuestra Excelencia". Don Javier demanded that the nominee declines the assignment. However, Valiente was already determined not to give in. In a personal letter to the claimant, dated November 1970, he underlined his loyalty to the Traditionalist principles, implicitly suggesting that it was Don Javier who might have abandoned them. The two broke definitely in late 1970, and in the spring of 1971 the so-called I Congreso del Pueblo Carlista, a grand carlohuguista assembly intended to turn Comunion Tradicionalista into a new Partido Carlista, formally expelled Valiente. Later the related terrorist organisation Grupos de Acción Carlista planned an assault against him.

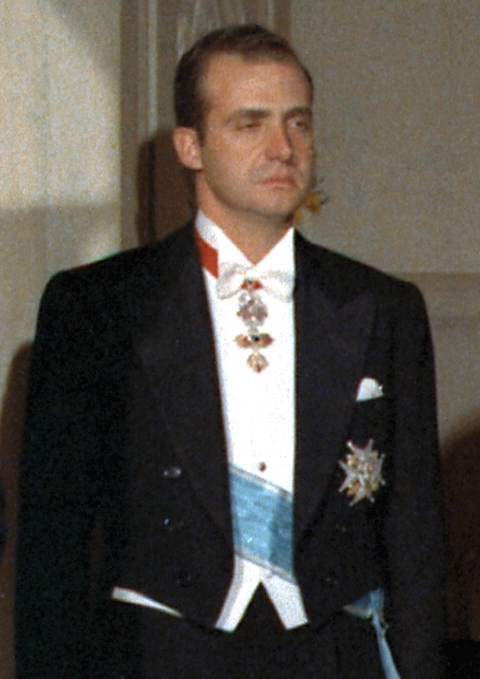
Prince of Spain, 1970s

In early 1971 Valiente was already engaged in buildup of Hermandad de Maestrazgo, formally a combatant grouping but intended as a new, genuine Carlist organization. He took part in a grand 1972 assembly, attended by some 700 participants, though he did not assume any formal position; in 1973 he clashed with Zamanillo over would-be alliance with Blas Piñar. Following relaxation of the law on political organizations, para-political groupings were no longer needed; Valiente started working around a new broadly based monarchist party, possibly with titular presidency of Juan Carlos. The organization eventually materialized in 1975 as Unión Nacional Española, but following internal disagreements Valiente left it already in early 1976; some doubted his credibility quoting the secret 1934 talks with Alfonso XIII. Later this year he advocated sort of a Traditionalist umbrella organization in form of a confederation, but failed. He voted in favor of Ley para la Reforma Política, dubbed "suicide of the Francoist Cortes"; as the chamber was dissolved Valiente lost his mandate in 1977. Also in 1977 he engaged in Alianza Popular, but abandoned it the following year in protest against endorsement of the 1978 constitution. In 1979 he joined Derecha Democrática Española, a renewed and failed attempt to build a popular conservative party.

== See also ==
- Carlism
- Traditionalism (Spain)
- Francoist Spain
