= Juventudes de Acción Popular =

Youth movement of the CEDA in Spain

Popular Action Youths Joventudes de Acción Popular
- Leader: José María Valiente Soriano (1932-1934); José María Pérez de Laborda (1934-1937)
- Founded: 22 February 1932
- Dissolved: 19 April 1937
- Merged into: FET y de las JONS
- Headquarters: Madrid
- Ideology: Spanish nationalism Authoritarianism; Agrarianism; Political Catholicism; Factions: National conservatism Liberal conservatism Fascism; Clerical fascism National syndicalism
- Colours: Green
- National affiliation: Popular Action (1932-1933); CEDA (1933-1937)
- Magazine: JAP

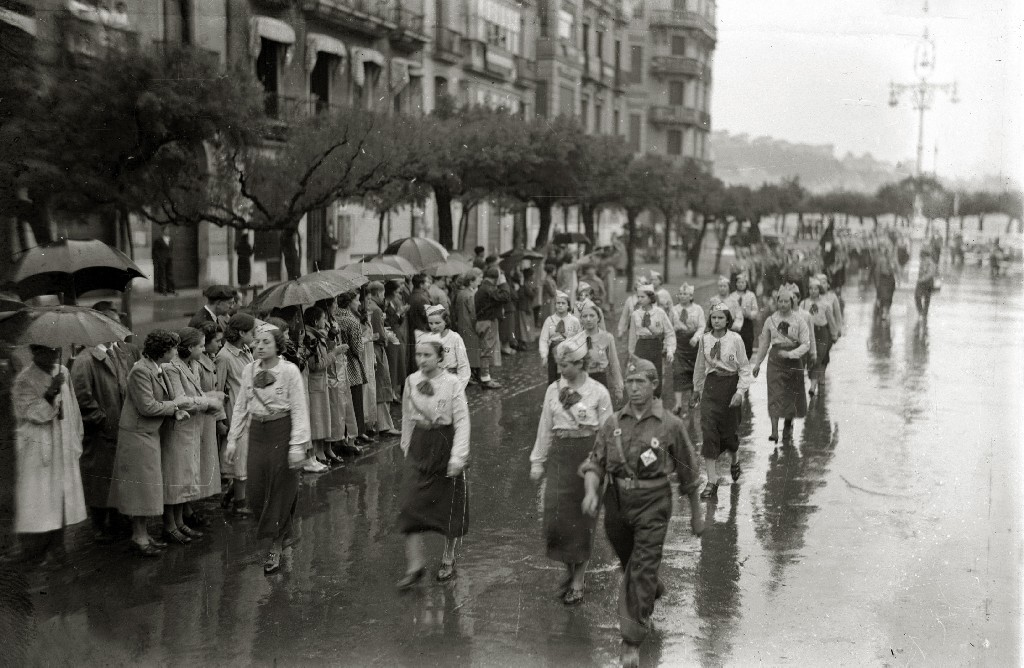
Female JAP section at parade, 1936

The Juventudes de Acción Popular (JAP) was the radicalised youth wing of the CEDA, the main Catholic party during part of the Second Spanish Republic. The organization underwent a process of fascistization whereas their members (japistas) shared a camaraderie with the main fascist and reactionary organizations.

The organisation was originally created as a branch of Acción Popular in 1933. Its founder and leader was José María Valiente Soriano. Expelled from CEDA and JAP in 1934 for his secret talks with Alfonso XIII, he was replaced by José María Perez de Laborda.

The JAP emphasized sporting and political activity. It had its own fortnightly paper, the first issue of which proclaimed: 'We want a new state.' The JAP's distaste for the principles of universal suffrage was such that internal decisions were never voted upon. As the thirteenth point of the JAP put it: 'Anti-parliamentarianism. Anti-dictatorship. The people participating in Government in an organic manner, not by degenerate democracy.' The line between Christian corporatism and fascist statism became very thin indeed. Conversely, Stanley Payne argues that JAP disliked fascist squadrism and denied that their focus on authority and leadership was to be interpreted as support for authoritarianism.

The fascist tendencies of the JAP were vividly demonstrated in the series of rallies held by the CEDA youth movement during the course of 1934. Using the title jefe (boss), the JAP created an intense and often disturbing cult around the figure of CEDA leader Gil Robles. Robles himself had returned from the Nuremberg rally in 1933 and spoken of its "youthful enthusiasm, steeped in optimism, so different to the desolate and enervating scepticism of our defeatists and intellectuals." JAP members wore green shirts and employed a salute that mimicked the fascist salute by raising the arm partway up.

Following the CEDA defeat at the 1936 election, the exalted JAP members fled to extreme right organizations such as Falange Española and the Carlist militia Requeté.

JAP ceased to exist in 1937, following the Unification Decree.

A history of the JAP by Sid Lowe has been published by Sussex Academic Press.
