= CEDA =

Political party in Spain (1933–1937)

Spanish Confederation of Autonomous Rights Confederación Española de Derechas Autónomas
- Leader: José María Gil-Robles y Quiñones
- Founder: José María Gil-Robles y Quiñones
- Founded: 4 March 1933
- Dissolved: 19 April 1937
- Merger of: Popular Action; Regional Valencian Right; Navarrese Union; Catalonian Popular Action; Castilian Agrarian Union
- Preceded by: Popular Action
- Headquarters: Madrid, Spain
- Newspaper: El Debate
- Youth wing: Juventudes de Acción Popular
- Membership (1933): 700,000 (party's claim)
- Ideology: Corporatism; National conservatism Christian democracy
- Political position: Right-wing
- Religion: Roman Catholicism
- Colors: Blue
- Congress of Deputies (1936): 88 / 473

Party flag
- Politics of Spain; Political parties; Elections; A: Also described as centre-right and far-right.

The Confederación Española de Derechas Autónomas (lit. 'Spanish Confederation of Autonomous Rights'; sometimes translated as Spanish Confederation of Autonomous Right-wing Groups; CEDA) was a short-lived, right-wing political party in the Second Spanish Republic. A Catholic force, it was the political heir to Ángel Herrera Oria's Acción Popular. Their political goal was replacing liberal democracy by a corporatist order. As such, they advocated for an authoritarian and corporatist State shaped after the Church's social doctrine.

The CEDA won a plurality in the 1933 legislative election, and then provided parliamentary support to Radical governments. The party represented the interests of the Catholic voters as well as the rural population of Spain, most prominently the medium and small peasants and landowners. The party sought the restoration of the powerful role of the Catholic Church that existed in Spain before the establishment of the Republic, and based their program solely on Catholic teaching, calling for land redistribution and industrial reform based on the distributist and corporatist ideals of rerum novarum and quadragesimo anno.

== Eclipse of the Republicans ==
Gil Robles set up CEDA to contest the 1933 Spanish general election. Despite dismissing the idea of a party as a 'rigid fiction', the CEDA leaders created a stable party organisation which would lead the Spanish right into the age of mass politics. The right would work together for 'the radical transformation of the regime' according to *Gaceta Regional* (27 December 1932; 9 January 1933), quoted by Vincent. The CEDA was constructed around organisational units known as Derechas Autónomas, the first of which had been established in Salamanca in December 1932. Having accepted the 'principles of Christian civilization', the 'autonomous' but confederated political bodies were said to retain full freedom, both of thought and of action – a permissive definition framed with the Carlists in mind.

The October 1933 announcement of a snap general election in November brought about an unprecedented mobilization of the Spanish right. El Debate instructed its readers to make the coming elections into an "obsession", the "sublime culmination of citizenly duties," so that victory in the polls would bring an end to the republican bienio rojo. Great emphasis was placed on the techniques of electoral campaigning. A national electoral committee was established—comprising CEDA, Alfonsist, Traditionalist, and Agrarian representatives—but excluding Miguel Maura's Conservative Republicans. The CEDA swamped entire localities with electoral publicity. It produced ten million leaflets, together with some two hundred thousand coloured posters, and hundreds of cars were used to distribute its materials throughout the provinces. In all of Spain's major cities, propaganda films were shown, displayed on screens mounted on large lorries.

== Polarisation of political opinions and the CEDA ==
The need for unity was the constant theme of the campaign fought by the CEDA and the election was presented as a confrontation of ideas, not of personalities. The electors' choice was simple: they voted for redemption or revolution and they voted for Christianity or Communism. The fortunes of Republican Spain, according to one CEDA poster, had been decided by 'immorality and anarchy'. Catholics who continued to proclaim their republicanism were moved into the revolutionary camp and many speeches argued that the Catholic republican option had become totally illegitimate. 'A good Catholic may not vote for the Conservative Republican party' declared a Gaceta Regional editorial and the impression was given that Conservative Republicans, far from being Catholics, were in fact anti-religious.

In this all-round attack on the political centre, the mobilization of women also became a major electoral tactic of the Catholic right. The Asociación Femenina de Educación (AFEC) had been formed in October 1931. As the 1933 general election approached, women were warned that unless they voted correctly, communism would come: "which will tear your children from your arms, your parish church will be destroyed, the husband you love will flee from your side authorized by the divorce law, anarchy will come to the countryside, hunger and misery to your home." AFEC orators and organisers urged women to vote 'For God and for Spain!'

CEDA's self-styled Sección de Defensa brought young male activists to the fore. In one incident in the last week of the campaign, in Guijuelo, the efforts of a group of left wing sympathisers to prevent people entering the bullring, where José María Lamamié de Clairac was speaking, led to a running battle with CEDA's sección de defensa. Later stopped and searched, they were found to be carrying a quantity of pizzle whips (bullwhips made from the dried penises of bulls), apparently taken along to 'fend off the violence which had been promised.' It was one example of the polarisation of political opinions which had occurred in the province of Salamanca, Robles's province, since the early days of the Republic. This new CEDA squad was also evident on election day itself, when its members patrolled the streets and polling stations in the provincial capital, supposedly to prevent the left from tampering with the ballot boxes.

In the 1933 elections, the CEDA won the most seats of any party in the legislative Cortes — in no small part because the massive CNT membership, holding true to their anarchist principles, had abstained. The CEDA had won a plurality of seats; however, these were not enough to form a majority. President Niceto Alcalá-Zamora then declined to invite the leader of the CEDA, Gil Robles, to form a government and instead invited the Radical Republican Party's Alejandro Lerroux to do so. CEDA supported the centrist government led by Lerroux. CEDA exchanged its goal of constitutional change for the promise to reverse the economic and religious policies of the previous government. The left on the other hand considered that CEDA represented a naked threat to republican democracy.

By 1 October 1934 CEDA demanded and received, three ministerial positions. They suspended most of the reforms of the previous Manuel Azaña government, provoking an armed miners' rebellion in Asturias on October 6, and an independentist rebellion in Catalonia—both rebellions were suppressed (the Asturias rebellion by young General Francisco Franco), and mass political arrests and trials followed.

The Juventudes de Acción Popular (JAP), the youth wing within the CEDA, "soon developed its own character. The JAP emphasized sporting and political activity. It had its own fortnightly paper, the first issue of which proclaimed: 'We want a new state.' The JAP's distaste for the principles of universal suffrage was such that internal decisions were never voted upon. As the thirteenth point of the JAP put it: "Anti-parliamentarianism. Anti-dictatorship. The people participating in Government in an organic manner, not by degenerate democracy." The JAP held a series of rallies during the course of 1934.

CEDA continued to mimic the German Nazi Party. Robles spoke at a rally in March 1934, to shouts of "Jefe" ("Chief", after the Italian "Duce" used by supporters of Mussolini). Robles used an anti-strike law to pick off trade union leaders one by one, and attempted to undermine the republican government of the Republican Left of Catalonia, which had sought to continue the republic's previous reforms. Using the title jefe, the JAP created an intense and often disturbing cult around the figure of Gil Robles.

Stanley Payne argues that CEDA was neither fascist nor democratic. Payne argues that CEDA's goal was to win power through legal means and to then enact a constitutional revision that would protect property and religion and alter the basic political system. They would create neither a fascist state nor an absolute monarchy but a Catholic, corporative republic. While this would entail the limitation of direct democratic rights, it would not be a state in the style of Hitler's Germany or Mussolini's Italy, but would probably be closer to the form of the neighbouring Portuguese Estado Novo.

On 26 September, the CEDA announced it would no longer support the RRP's minority government; it was replaced by a RRP cabinet, led by Lerroux once more, that included three members of the CEDA.

== Rifts and civil war ==
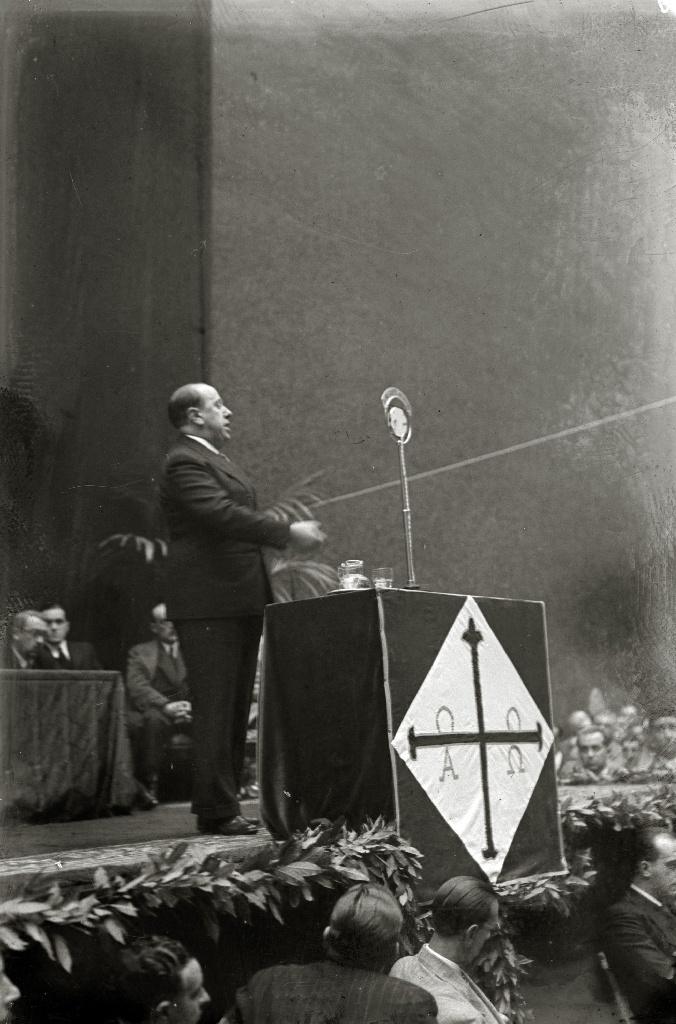
José María Gil-Robles at a campaign rally at San Sebastián in 1935.

Between November 1934 and March 1935, the CEDA minister for agriculture, Manuel Giménez Fernández, introduced into parliament a series of agrarian reform measures designed to better conditions in the Spanish countryside. These moderate proposals met with a hostile response from reactionary elements within the Cortes, including the conservative wing of the CEDA and the proposed reform was defeated. A change of personnel in the ministry also followed. The agrarian reform bill proved to be a catalyst for a series of increasingly bitter divisions within the Catholic right, rifts that indicated that the broad based CEDA alliance was disintegrating. Partly as a result of the impetus of the JAP, the Catholic party had been moving further to the right, forcing the resignation of moderate government figures, including Filiberto Villalobos. Gil-Robles was not prepared to return the agriculture portfolio to Giménez Fernández. "For all the social Catholic rhetoric, the extreme right had won the day."

Lerroux's Radical government collapsed after two large scandals, the Straperlo affair and the Nombela scandal. However, Zamora did not allow the CEDA to form a government, and called elections. The elections of February 16, 1936 were narrowly won by the Popular Front, with vastly smaller resources than the political right, who followed Nazi propaganda techniques. Monarchist José Calvo Sotelo replaced Gil Robles as the right's leading spokesman in parliament. The Falange expanded massively, and thousands of the JAP joined the organisation (though the majority of the JAP seem to have abandoned politics). They successfully created a sense of militancy on the streets, in order to make an authoritarian regime justifiable. CEDA came under direct attack from the Falange. This rapid radicalization of the CEDA youth movement effectively meant that all attempts to save parliamentary Catholicism were doomed to failure.

CEDA played no official role in the military uprising that sparked the Spanish Civil War. However, some of the party's leaders, such as Gil Robles, were aware of the conspiracy in the army and tried to moderate it. Gil Robles met with Manuel Fal Conde, and offered CEDA's support to the uprising if the rebels were to agree to hand power over to a civilian government as soon as control was established. However, the conspirators rejected this condition. According to one historian, on the eve of the civil war, the CEDA as a whole persisted in legalism and opposition to overthrowing the republic and that "there is little evidence of widespread support for the conspiracy among local cedistas". Gil Robles appealed to the party members to "not take part in possible organizations of repression". However historian Paul Preston states that in fact CEDA members were prominent in the repression. In addition, "Gil Robles instructed regional party leaders that, on the outbreak of the rising, all party members were to join the military immediately, party organizations were to offer full collaboration, youth sections were to join the army..."

As an organization, the CEDA played no official role in the uprising, but Gil Robles’s actions defy simple categorization. After giving Mola money, Gil Robles met with Fal Conde, the national leader of the Traditionalist Commune, who had relations with the conspirators. In their meeting, Gil Robles offered the CEDA’s aid to the uprising if the rebels agreed to hand power over to a civilian government as soon as they had control.

CEDA became the target of attack in some Republican-controlled zones, with many party members, such as Dimas de Madariaga, being killed by Republican militias. Others sought refuge in foreign embassies, such as Francisco Casares. Other CEDA members came to believe that CEDA had become irrelevant and joined the rebels - this course of action was taken by Franco's co-brother-in-law Ramón Serrano Suñer, who ended up becoming chief of the political junta of the FET y de las JONS. In the course of the civil war, the Communist Party of Spain took over the party's headquarters in Madrid and destroyed its archives.

In April 1937, the rebel leader Francisco Franco issued the Unification Decree which laid out the creation of the FET y de las JONS upon the merging of the Fascist FE de las JONS and the traditionalist carlists, outlawing the rest of political parties in the rebel-controlled territory. As result, CEDA ceased to exist.

== Aftermath ==
Francisco Franco and the rest of the military did not trust CEDA, seeing Gil Robles as a potential rival. This led to his exile to Portugal. Apart from Suñer, very few CEDA members achieved high positions in the new military government. Historian Carles Viver Pi-Sunyer found that only 8.6% of the Franco's government officials were former CEDA members. CEDA was not trusted because it was considered to have worked too closely with the Republican government.

After the civil war, many former CEDA members emerged as critics of the Francoist regime, including Gil Robles, Jesús Pabón, and Manuel Giménez Fernández. In 1944, Francoist police investigated CEDA members who stayed in Spain, including Cándido Casanueva y Gorjón, on suspicion of organizing resistance against the government; this led to several arrests. In the 1960s and 1970s, former CEDA cadres participated in the anti-Francoist Christian Democracy movement, and after the death of Franco, Gil Robles founded the Democratic People's Federation and took part in the 1977 Spanish general election.

== Ideology ==
The party's program followed Catholic social teaching - on economic issues, the party based their proposals on the encyclicals of Pope Leo XIII and Pope Pius XI and sought to compete with left-wing parties for working-class support. CEDA disavowed class struggle, recognized the right of women to work outside the home, insisted on the imposition of the family wage, and advocated an egalitarian distribution of land in order to create a large class of smallholders, along distributist and corporatist principles. On social issues, CEDA called for respect of the autonomy of the Catholic Church, including allowing the Church to purchase and own property. It also postulated freedom of religious orders, a new concordat, and the need to maintain "friendly relations in such matters as interest the Church and the State, and for the liquidation of the sectarian legislation that the Governments of the Republic have been dictating unilaterally".

According to Jay P. Corrin, CEDA "was a party of moderate Catholic opinion, and many of its members were prepared to support the Republic. Juan J. Linz described the party as "the rightist center" of the Spanish Republic. It supported accidentalism, in that it treated the form of the Spanish government irrelevant as long as it protected Catholic interests. It had to accommodate conflicting interests, as while papal encyclicals rerum novarum and quadragesimo anno called for redistribution of landed wealth and industrial reform that would favor the workers, CEDA was also sponsored by the landed oligarchy. Lastly, while the party favored republicanism, its commitment was faint-hearted, as the main goal of the party was the restoration of the Catholic Church to its former position of dominance. Nevertheless, the party did oppose military government.

== See also ==
- Second biennium of the Second Spanish Republic

== Bibliography ==
- Álvarez Tardío, Manuel (2011). "Politics, Violence and Electoral Democracy in Spain: the case of the CEDA, 1933-1934" (PDF). Bulletin for Spanish and Portuguese Historical Studies. 35 (1).
- Beevor, Antony (2006). The Battle for Spain: The Spanish Civil War 1936–1939. Penguin Group. ISBN 978-0-14-303765-1.
- Corrin, Jay P. (2002). "The Religious Crusade in Spain". Catholic Intellectuals and the Challenge of Democracy. University of Notre Dame Press. doi:10.2307/j.ctvpj7d6c. JSTOR j.ctvpj7d6c.
- Montero, José Ramón (1977), La CEDA: El catolicismo social y politico en la Segunda República (in Spanish), Revista de Trabajo
- Gil-Robles, José María (1968). No fue posible la paz (in Spanish). Barcelona: Ariel. OCLC 2801515.
- Linz, Juan J. (April 1976). "Patterns of Land Tenure, Division of Labor, and Voting Behavior in Europe". Special Issue on Peasants and Revolution. Comparative Politics. 8 (3): 386. doi:10.2307/421406. JSTOR 421406.
- Pierce, Samuel M. (2007). Political Catholicism in Spain's Second Republic (1931-1936): The Confederación Española de Derechas Autónomas in Madrid, Seville, and Toledo (PDF). University of Florida Digital Collections (PhD thesis). University of Florida.
- Preston, Paul (1994). The Coming of the Spanish Civil War (2 ed.). London: Routledge. ISBN 9780203392898.
- Preston, Paul (May 1999). "Franco and Azaña: victor and vanquished". History Today. 49 (5): 17–22.
- Preston, Paul (2006). The Spanish Civil War: Reaction, Revolution & Revenge (3 ed.). HarperCollins. ISBN 0007232071.
- Preston, Paul (2013). The Spanish Holocaust. Inquisition and Extermination in Twentieth-century Spain. London: HarperPress. ISBN 9780006386957.
- Rodríguez López-Brea, Carlos M. (2022). "El catolicismo político: una nueva presencia en la política española (1922-1936)" [Political Catholicism: a new presence in Spanish politics (1922-1936)]. Historia Contemporánea (in Spanish) (69). UPV/EHU. doi:10.1387/hc.23078. hdl:10810/57630. ISSN 1130-2402.
- Schatz, Sara (May 2001). "Democracy's Breakdown and the Rise of Fascism: The Case of the Spanish Second Republic, 1931-6". Social History. 26 (2). Taylor & Francis, Ltd. JSTOR 4286762.
- Thomas, Hugh (1961). The Spanish Civil War (1 ed.). London: Eyre and Spottiswoode.
- Vincent, Mary (1996). Catholicism in the Second Spanish Republic: religion and politics in Salamanca, 1930-1936. London: Clarendon Press. ISBN 9780198206132. OCLC 33817666.
