= José María Araúz de Robles Estremera =

Spanish politician, businessman and bull breeder

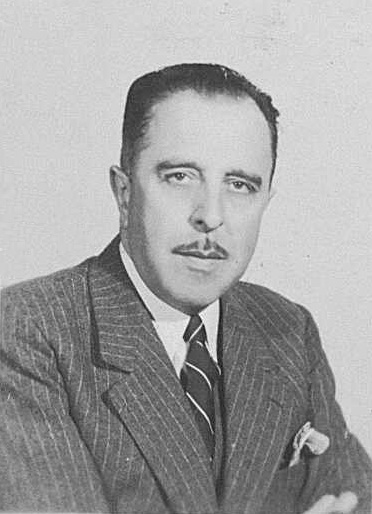
- Born: José María Araúz de Robles; 1898; Molina de Aragón, Spain
- Died: 1977 (aged 78–79); Vega de Arias, Spain
- Occupation: lawyer
- Known for: politician
- Political party: Partido Social Popular, Comunión Tradicionalista

José María Araúz de Robles Estremera (1898–1977) was a Spanish Carlist and Alfonsist politician, businessman and bull breeder. He is recognized as a theorist of Traditionalist labor organisation and an advocate of gremialism, a counter-proposal to the Francoist vertical syndicates. His lineage of bulls was fairly popular in the 1950s and became a point of reference in the business, to go into decline in the 1970s.

== Family and youth ==
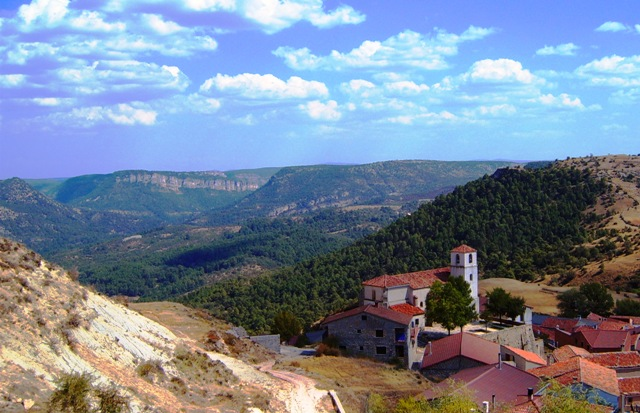
Alto Tajo region

The Biscay Araúz family arrived in the Alto Tajo mountains as miners and foundrymen. They settled in Peralejos de las Truchas and constructed Casa Grande de Araúz in 1816; some joined the Carlists during the Carlist Wars. The grandfather of José María, Simón Araúz Huerta, was a bull-breeder who in 1905 co-founded what is now Unión de Criadores de Toros de Lidia. A branch of the family kept breeding bulls until 1931, when the Hermanos Araúz brand disappeared from the market. The father of José María, Enrique Araúz Estremera, studied at Colegio Molinés de Padres Escolapios in Madrid and practiced as a doctor in his native village, where he also served as alcalde; also a Carlist, he remained sensitive to social issues and co-operated with the local workers' periodical, La Alcarria Obrera. In 1895 he published La hija del Tío Paco o lo que pueden dos mil duros. Heavily influenced by José María de Pereda, the book fell into the costumbrismo trend. At unspecified time he married María Robles Arnal, also from Molina.

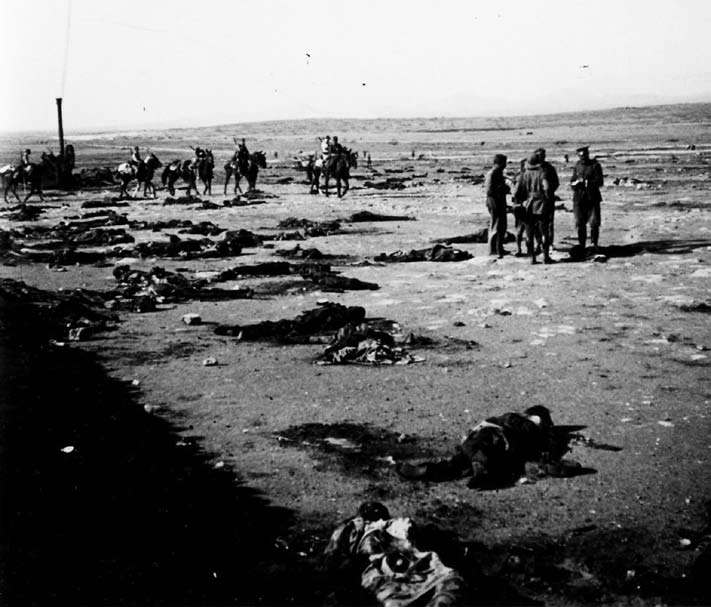
Battle of Annual remnants

José María and his siblings were brought up in a profoundly Catholic ambience. Orphaned by father in 1905, he moved to Madrid to attend the Salesian Colegio de San Juan Bautista. He studied law in Universidad Central de Madrid to obtain his PhD laurels in 1919; in 1921 he became Abogado del Estado. Drafted to the army he reduced his term as a soldier de cuota and served in Regimiento Inmemorial del Rey during the Moroccan campaign, witnessing the battle of Annual in 1921. Upon his return married to Mercedes López Ramiro; the couple had 5 sons: Fernando, José Maria, Jesús, Javier and Santiago. Javier married Ana Dávila, daughter of the Falangist politician Sancho Dávila y Fernández. Santiago Araúz de Robles López, a lawyer by profession and a hunter by vocation, apart from juridical contributions is best known as author of novels and essays revolving around rural life, not an unusual Carlist thread. The brother of José María, Carlos Araúz de Robles Estremera, also a lawyer, became an author of multiple works in law/legislation, history and letters, including essays, poetry and novels, also with the costumbrista leaning. The maternal cousin, Romualdo de Toledo y Robles, during early Francoism was a longtime high official in Ministry of Education.

== Early public activity ==
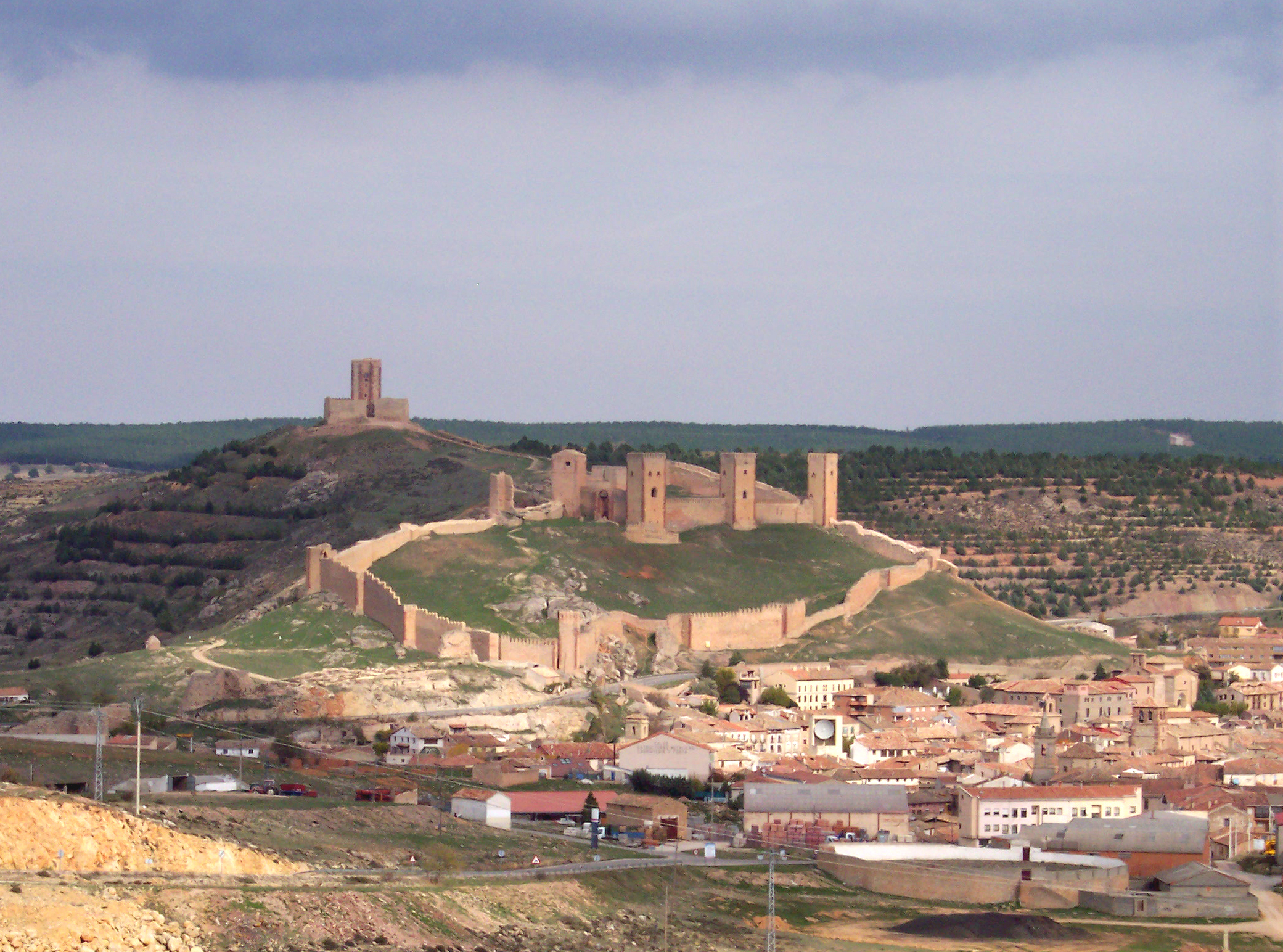
Molina de Aragón

Throughout the 1920s Araúz de Robles practiced law in Huesca, Sevilla, Ávila and Madrid, serving also in the local Molina de Aragón ayuntamiento. In 1922 he co-founded a Christian-Democratic Partido Social Popular, and became a member of its defensa nacional section. In the mid-1920s he published a few short novels: Don Bernardo "el Idumeo" (1922), Si tu supieras! (1923) and Estrella errante (192?), written in a baroque version of costumbrismo, though it was rather his wartime recollections Por el Camino de Annual (1924) that gained more popularity. In 1928 he organized local homages to the molinés soldiers fallen in the Rif War, attended by King Alfonso XII; he also sponsored the monument built at Monte Arruit in Morocco. In the late 1920s Araúz co-founded Asociación Católica de Padres de Familia to become its secretary in the early 1930s. During political disarray of Dictablanda, Araúz on various public meetings defended the monarchy and harangued against the republican designs, including these of a conservative format; he donated money to families of those who died fighting the failed republican coup in Jaca. Lobbied for construction of the La Roda – Tarazona railway line, which would cross the Moncayo massif and benefit his native Molina region.

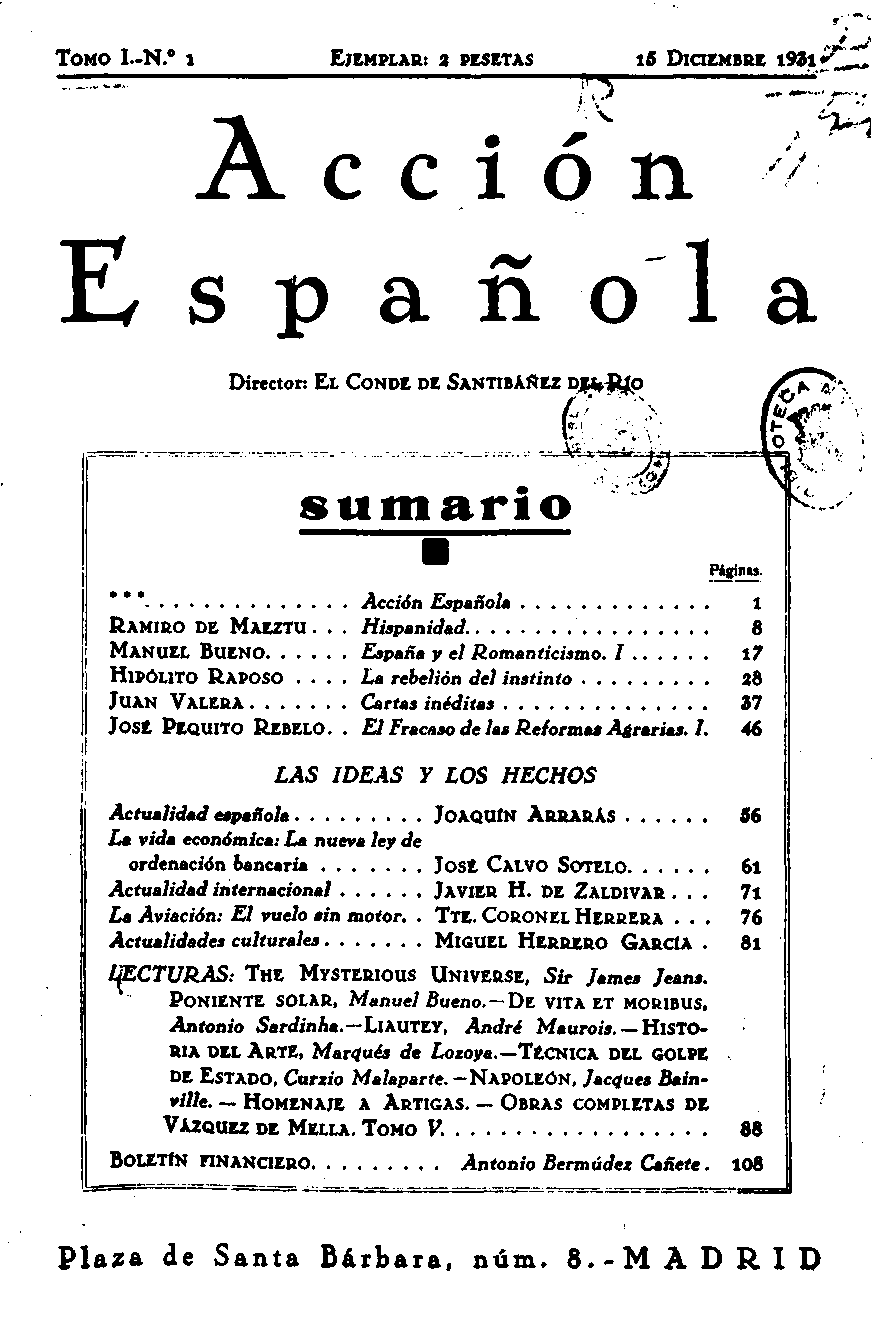
first issue of Acción Española

During the first days of the Republic Araúz joined the Agrarian Party and as its candidate unsuccessfully ran for Cortes from the Guadalajara province in 1931. Late 1931 he co-founded the Alfonsist monarchist organization Acción Española and early the following year he set up its journal of the same name. Continuing with his interest in social issues, in 1932 Araúz co-organised Primer Congreso del Pensamiento Social Popular. During 1931-1932 he took part in a number of broadly monarchist public meetings, often jointly with the Traditionalist leaders. Attracted by Carlist intransigence, he drew close to their Comunión Tradicionalista. In the months of 1933-34 Araúz participated in a series of Carlist public meetings, conferences and lectures, sometimes assuming a somewhat revolutionary tone. He formally broke with the Agrarians in 1934; in a letter to its leader, Martinez de Velasco he pointed that political parties and inorganic democracy no longer suited the needs of Spain.

== Carlist against the Republic ==
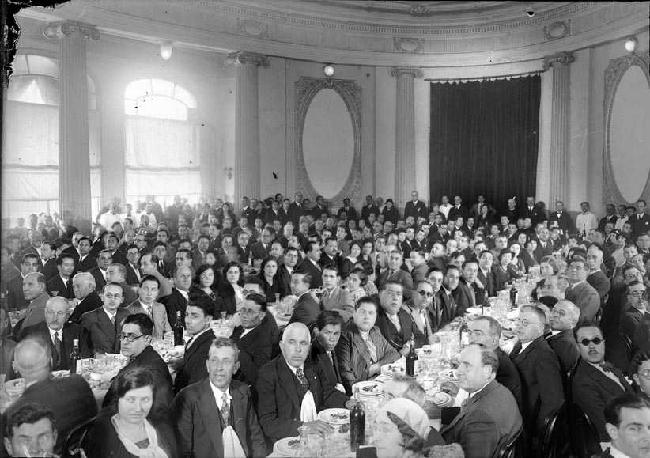
Carlist gathering, 1930s

Within Carlism, Araúz became a new rising figure. In the 1933 elections he successfully ran on the Carlist ticket from Granada. In the 1936 elections (also in Granada) he emerged victorious and was even nominated secretary of the Carlist parliamentary minority, but his mandate was cancelled due to alleged irregularities. Araúz conspired against the Republic as member of the La Ferme based Junta Nacional Carlista. Following the outbreak of hostilities he joined the Burgos-based Junta Carlista de Guerra and became head of its Guilds and Corporations section, sort of Carlist "ministry of labor" bent to build a syndical structure competitive to the Falangist scheme. Araúz co-engineered the raid of Aragonese Requetés who captured his native Molina de Aragon early August 1936; he later contributed to forming of the local Requeté battalion, Tercio de María de Molina.

Late summer 1936 Araúz strived to install the Catholic Confederación Española de Sindicatos Obreros (CESO) syndicate by the Burgos-based National Defense Junta. As the Francoist quasi-government banned any trade union activities the Carlists tried to find a workaround by creating Obra Nacional Corporativa in November, an attempt to build own labor structure to be headed by Araúz, and defended its integrity against the Falangist CONS unions. At that time he emerged as "chief theorist of corporativism" within the Traditionalist realm.

Carlist standard

In 1937 he published Plan de la Obra Nacional Corporativa and Corporativismo gremial, sketching rules for the future organization of labor. The vision was based on Christian social theory, laid out in Spain by Severino Aznar Embid and developed ideas drafted in Araúz's earlier pamphlet La nueva politica: ideas sobre el futuro de España (1929). The works proposed to defuse social conflict by political representation of labor, wage control, pension schemes, unemployment and sick plans, arbitration boards, cooperatives, anti-speculation laws etc. They endorsed a regulated state, though fell short of syndicalism schemes and vehemently criticized fascism; some scholars view it as a hybrid of Christian-social and Traditionalist patterns, though some classify it as corporativism. Carlos Hugo, a future leader of Partido Carlista, would refer to Araúz's vision in the 1959 Montejurra meeting when commencing his campaign to steer Carlism towards socialism.

== Carlist against Franco ==
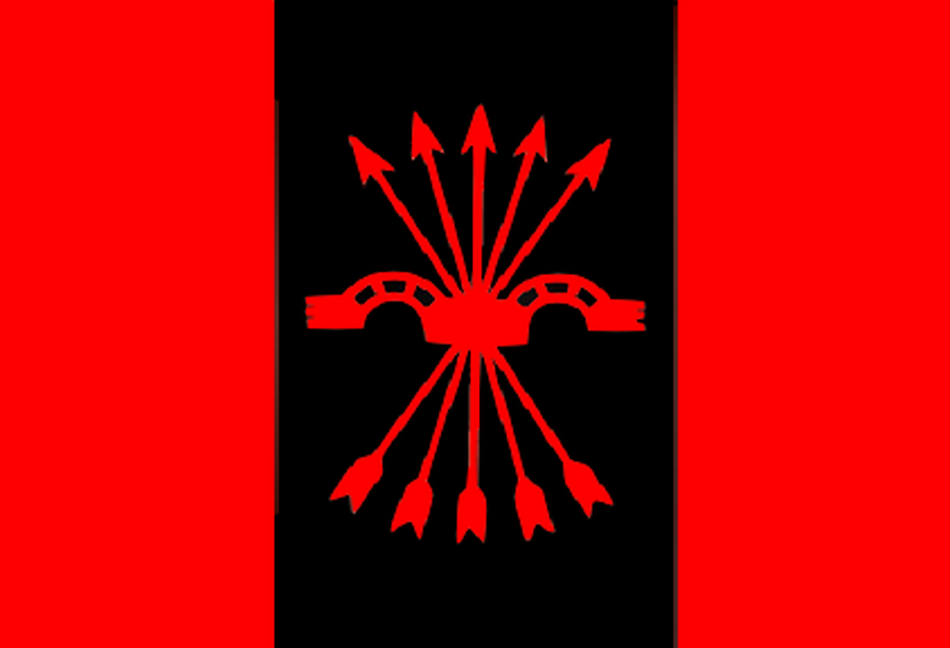
the Falangist standard

During the meeting of top Carlist leaders in Insua in February 1937 Araúz seemed undecided about the Carlist strategy towards the forthcoming unification threat, concerned more about the unity of Traditionalism. Together with Lamamié de Clairac he talked in Villarreal de Álava to the Falangist leader Manuel Hedilla and agreed that either unification would take place on their terms, or not at all. He is listed as a member of the in-between Carlist group, neither decisively opposing nor decisively supporting the unification, though he soon adopted a dissident stand and in October 1937 got expulsed from Falange Española Tradicionalista. His bid to build Carlist syndicates failed. Though CESO tried to avoid amalgamation by federating within the ONC, Obra Nacional Corporativa was eventually incorporated into the Francoist trade unions and Araúz was removed from integrated labor structures. Personally regarded unfavourably in the Franco headquarters, he enlisted to the Requetes and took part in the Biscay campaign, finally withdrawing from the Francoist political and military structures.

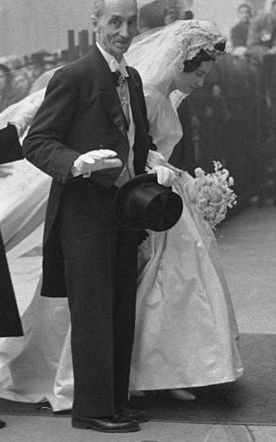
Don Javier, 1960

In the early 1940s Araúz, determined to bring the monarchy back, was steering between the Carlists and the Alfonsists. In August 1943 along with Manuel Fal Conde and a number of other Carlist leaders he signed a letter to Franco, demanding that fascistoid features of the regime are replaced with Traditionalist solutions; the response was his detention and a month spent behind bars in the Dirección General de Seguridad prison. Later the same year he conferred with the Alfonsinos concerning their policy towards Francoism. He supported a manifesto to be issued by their claimant Don Juan, a document intended to dissociate the pretender from Franco; in minority, he fruitlessly advocated a bold action. In 1944 he supported vague plans for a joint monarchist coup against Franco. In 1946 together with conde Rodezno he visited Don Juan in Estoril, sounding him on a would-be dynastical agreement between himself and the Carlist regent-claimant Don Javier. Formally the mission did not breach the rules of Carlist regency, but in fact it was bordering disloyalty to Don Javier. In 1957 together with Arellano he sought Carlist adhesions to the Juanista project and emerged among leaders of the initiative; eventually, both Araúz de Robles brothers, José Maria and Carlos, joined a large fraction of Carlists who recognized Don Juan as the legitimate Carlist pretender. The Acto de Estoril declaration marked his formal break with mainstream Carlism. He was expulsed from Comunión and faced anger of the javierista crowd during the Carlist Montejurra amassment of the following year.

== Juanista ==
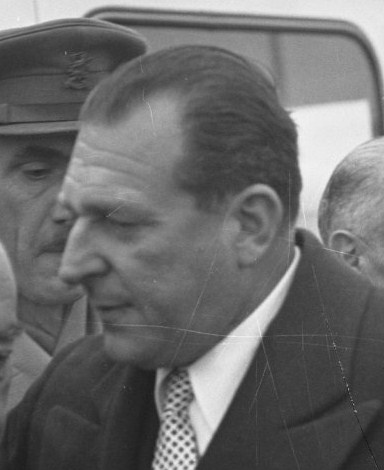
Don Juan, 1959

In 1957 Araúz co-founded Junta Nacional de la Comunion Tradicionalista, styled as formal body within mainstream Carlism; presiding it, he co-ordinated buildup of its local structures. He also co-founded Amigos de Maeztu, a monarchist lobbying group styled as a literary association, and became its vice-president and a member of Junta Directiva. His relations with Don Juan cooled; Araúz was disappointed by the claimant's backtracking on his declared Traditionalist outlook, while Don Juan was disappointed by Araúz's failure to bring all Carlists into his camp. Nevertheless, he remained a member of the Juanist Consejo de la Corona and Consejo Privado (though not his Secretariado Político). As advisor to Don Juan he firmly opposed the democratic tendency. In 1961, when the Boletín de la Secretaría del Consejo Privado endorsed a monarchy based on parliamentary party politics, Araúz reacted with a letter to the Council's head, José María Pemán, voicing his disgust. He presented the same stand in public debate. When ABC published a front-page piece of Rafael Calvo, pointing to a possible co-existence between liberalism and Catholicism, Araúz repelled the thesis. By mid-1960s Araúz discarded his anti-Francoism and pressed a collaborative strategy towards the regime, somewhat against a cautious approach favoured by Pemán and other Juanista leaders.

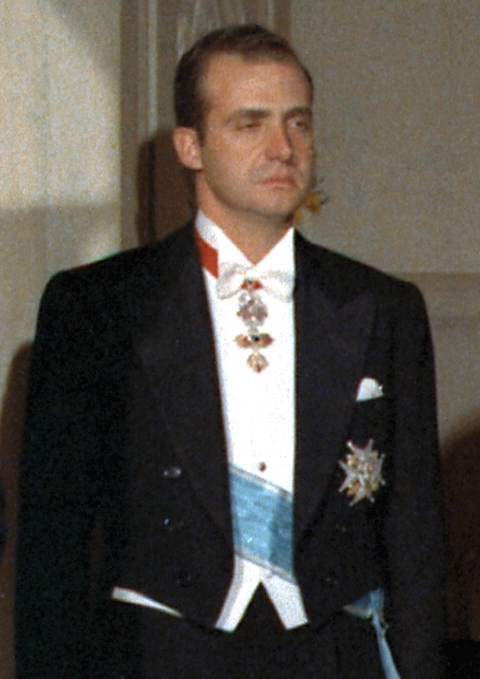
Juan Carlos, 1971

As it became apparent that Franco would ignore Don Juan and mark his son Juan Carlos as the future king, most Juanistas found themselves confused. Araúz aligned himself with the official line and re-oriented himself towards the young prince. When in 1966 the ABC daily called on its front page for Don Juan to assume the throne, the issue was forcibly withdrawn from sale; two days later the newspaper published the text of Araúz, who denied his Carlist identity and in Aesopian language argued that Don Juan would be hostage to party politics, while Juan Carlos would be the king of all Spaniards. He later advocated "yes" vote in referendum on the Organic Law of the State, which, however, did not advance the answer to succession question beyond the vague 1947 formula. In late 1960s Araúz tried to approach Juan Carlos and was present during the 1968 baptism of his son, Don Felipe.

Araúz did not make it to the inner circle of the prince, possibly because he remained a firm opponent of democracy. During the final years of Francoism he assailed "political associations" (a long-discussed idea at that time about to materialize) in letters to both popular newspapers and specialized reviews. He tried to prevent the socialist takeover of Carlism by creating a competitive combatant Requeté association or a competitive Carlist political organization, first as Hermandad de Maestrazgo and then as Comunión Tradicionalista, praising also the virtues of Traditionalist Fal Conde in his 1975 obituary. Though his brother Carlos joined the Spanish National Union, José Maria never has. In one of his last public statements, dated August 1976 and titled "An unanswered message", Araúz confirmed his mistrust towards democracy.

== Bull breeder ==
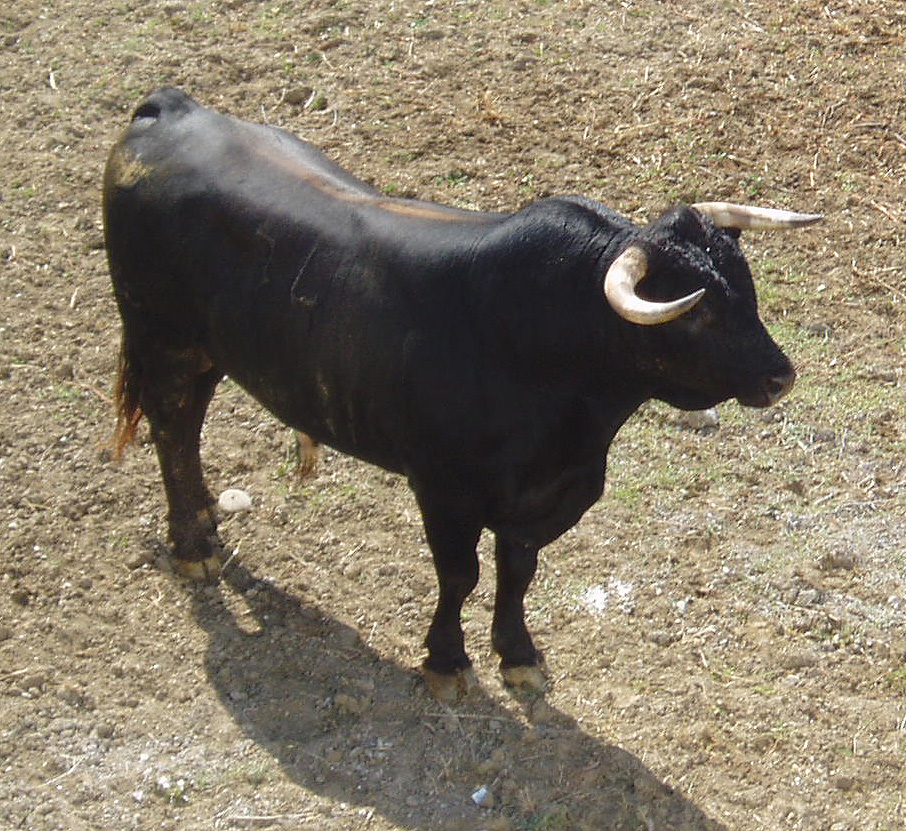
toro de lidia

In 1945 Arauz de Robles purchased toro bravo livestock of the local Herederos de Rufo Serrano Muñoz company, shortly before owned by a modest torero, Mariano García de Lora. He energetically ventured to refresh the breed with new studs from Samuel Flores and Guardiola Soto breeds and raised his own sementales. He registered his own hierro in 1947 and the same year his bulls (the first one named Asustado) started to appear on the arenas, most notably on the Madrid Las Ventas. In the 1940s Arauz de Robles was aggressively developing the business, co-operating with recognized local ranchers like Vicente Sierra Peiró and purchasing 60-70 cows at local fairs. He specialized in the novillas bulls, gaining notoriety with Choricero (1951). He pursued a fairly unusual path by mating of cross-lineage breeds, resulting in some unrepeatability and unpredictability of the bulls. In the 1950s he bought another ranch in the heart of the Andalusian Sierra Morena, which initially served auxiliary purposes.

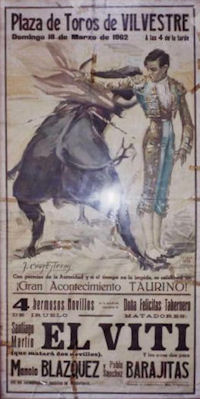
bullfight poster, 1962

The lineage became an established brand on the Spanish toro bravo market in the 1950s and early 1960s. In the 1970s Arauz de Robles switched to the mainstream toro de lidia; his ganadería formed one of the 30-odd bull-ranches which served as a point of reference in scientific studies, also taking part in celebrated events like the Pamplona Sanfermines. In 1978 the breed was taken over by his son Francisco Javier Arauz de Robles López, who changed the hierro (1978) and later moved the ganaderia to Jaen province. Initially fairly active, recently it has been rather quiescent, with the owners pointing to a number of difficulties, including competition from Domecq breed. This, plus allegedly declining quality led some organisations to black-list the breed, despite the owner's marketing campaign. The lineage is present on the official UCTL list. Santiago Araúz de Robles López started breeding horses in Baños de la Encina. He has approached bullfighting from the scholarly perspective of a social scientist.

== See also ==
- Carlism
- Francoism
- Corporativism
- Spanish Fighting Bull
