= Popular Action (Spain) =

Popular Action Acción Popular
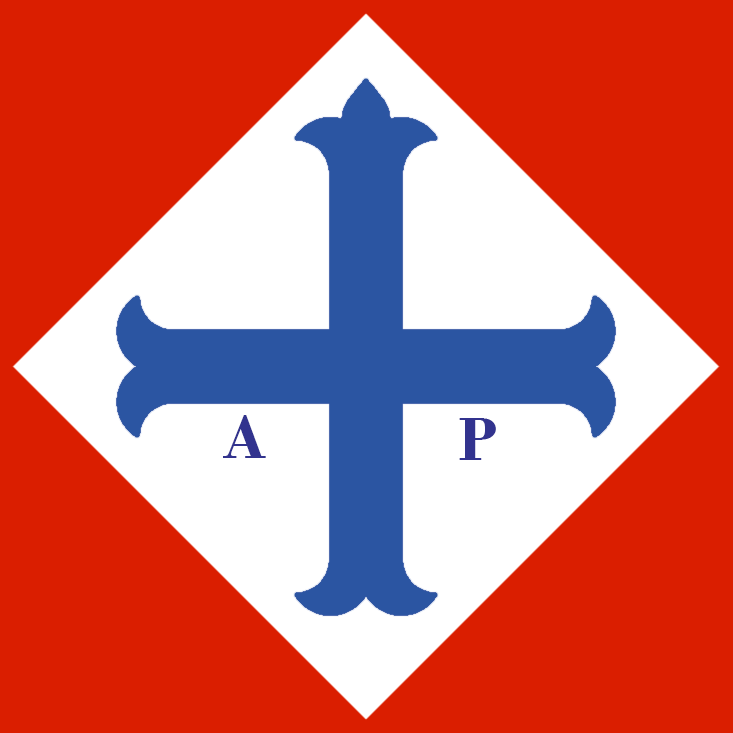
- Leader: Ángel Herrera Oria
- Founded: 29 April 1931
- Dissolved: 1933
- Merged into: CEDA
- Headquarters: Madrid
- Youth wing: Juventudes de Acción Popular
- Ideology: National conservatism Monarchism; Political Catholicism
- Political position: Right-wing

Popular Action (Spanish: Acción Popular), until 1932 National Action (Spanish: Acción Nacional), was a Spanish Roman Catholic political party active during the Second Spanish Republic.

The group was formed after the fall of the monarchy and the defeat of monarchist parties in the 1931 elections, in order to defend the interests of Roman Catholics in the new Spanish Republic. It emanated from the Asociación Católica Nacional de Propagandistas and effectively formed a political party drawn from this hard-line monarchist movement. The main leader of Popular Action was editor of El Debate and future cardinal Ángel Herrera Oria. In 1932, National Action had to change its name, because parties and political movements were prohibited to use the word "national" in their names.

The Popular Action sought to unite the right-wing, monarchist and Catholic camp and thus became the core of a conservative federation of parties, the Spanish Confederation of Autonomous Right-wing Groups (CEDA), established in 1933.

Even after the formation of CEDA the party's youth movement, Juventudes de Acción Popular (commonly known as the Greenshirts) continued to organise. However, in the spring of 1936, the decline of Popular Action was underlined when 15,000 Greenshirts left the movement to join Falange Española de las JONS instead. On the eve of the Spanish Civil War, Popular Action had around 12,000 members. When Francisco Franco announced his decree establishing FET y de las JONS on 19 April 1937, Popular Action was one of a number of parties absorbed into this new pan-right group.
