= Luis Arellano Dihinx =

Spanish Carlist and Francoist politician

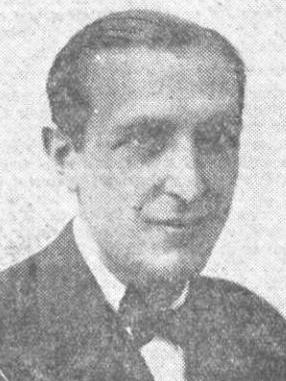
- Born: Luis Arellano Dihinx; 1906; Zaragoza, Spain
- Died: 1969 (aged 62–63); Pamplona, Spain
- Occupation: lawyer
- Known for: Politician
- Political party: Comunión Tradicionalista, FET

Luis Arellano Dihinx (1906–1969) was a Spanish Carlist and Francoist politician. He is recognized as one of the leaders of the so-called Juanistas, a faction within Carlism pressing recognition of the Alfonsist claimant Don Juan de Borbón as a legitimate Carlist heir to the throne.

== Family and youth ==
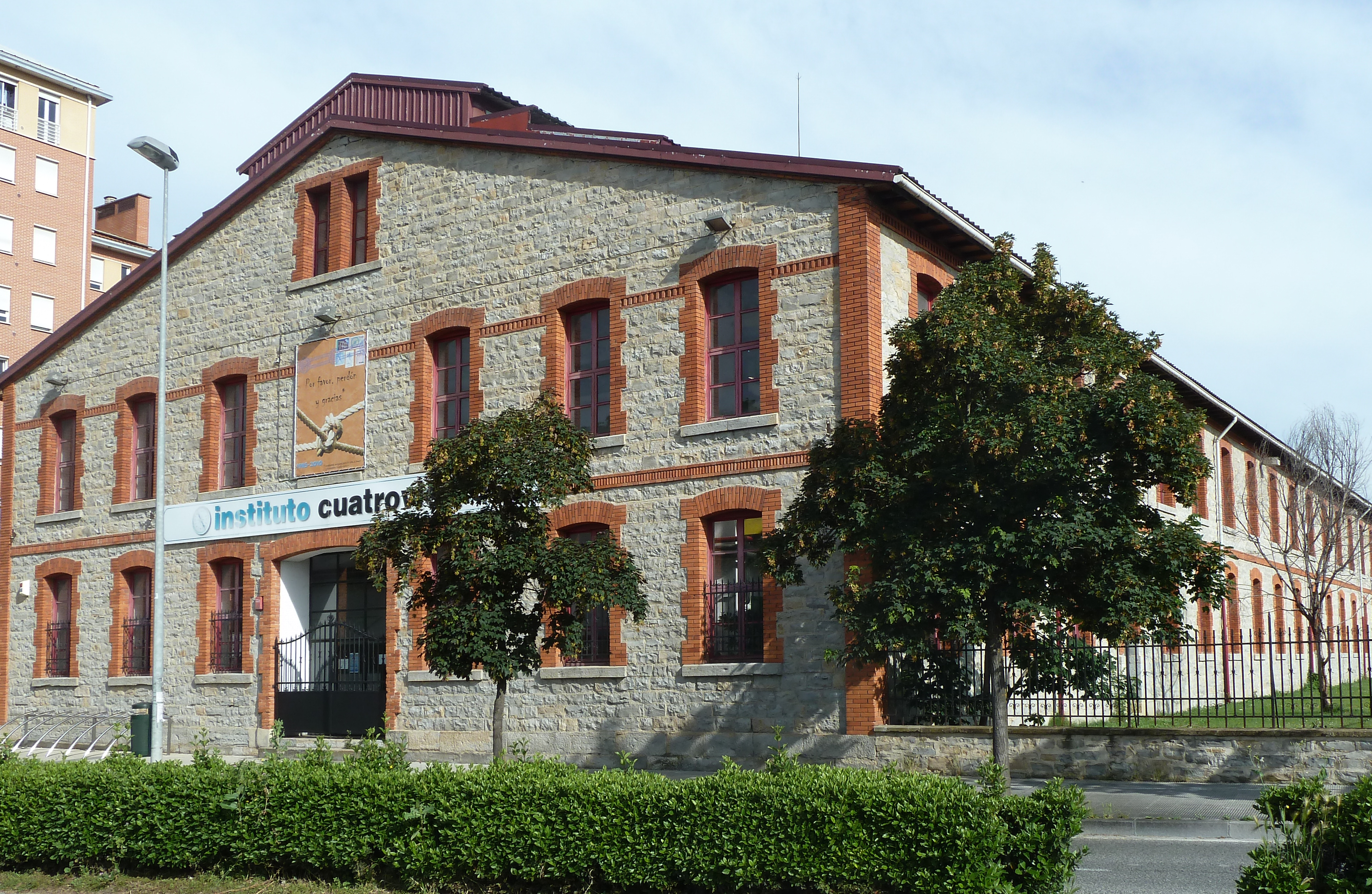
Múgica y Arellano factory, Pamplona

The Arellano family counts among the oldest ones in Navarre; it was first noted in the 14th century and is related to the family of medieval Navarrese kings. Over the centuries it got extremely branched with representatives in many regions of Spain, though mostly in the North. One of its branches held large estates in Caparroso, in the Southern part of Navarre known as Ribera Aragón; in the early 19th century José Arellano y Ochoa was its alcalde and one of key figures. Luis's father, Cornelio Arellano Lapuerta (1867-1935), a native of Caparroso, made his name as engineer and entrepreneur, growing into mid-ranks of the Navarrese bourgeoisie. His engineering works ranged from Irati Train, the railroad line connecting Pamplona and Sangüesa across a difficult, wooded and hilly Irati terrain, to hydrotechnical constructions on the Ebro and other rivers. He held stakes in Hidráulica de Moncayo and was long-time vice-president of Arteta, a water-pipe company. He is best known, however, as co-founder and co-owner of Múgica, Arellano y Compañía, the Pamplona-based company which produced and traded agricultural machinery. Already in the 1920s it operated 20 subsidiaries, some of them as far as Badajoz, Seville and Cordoba; later on it grew to the 16-th largest company in Navarre. In the 1930s Cornelio Arellano was among the most influential people in the Navarrese power-generation industry and a well recognized engineer.

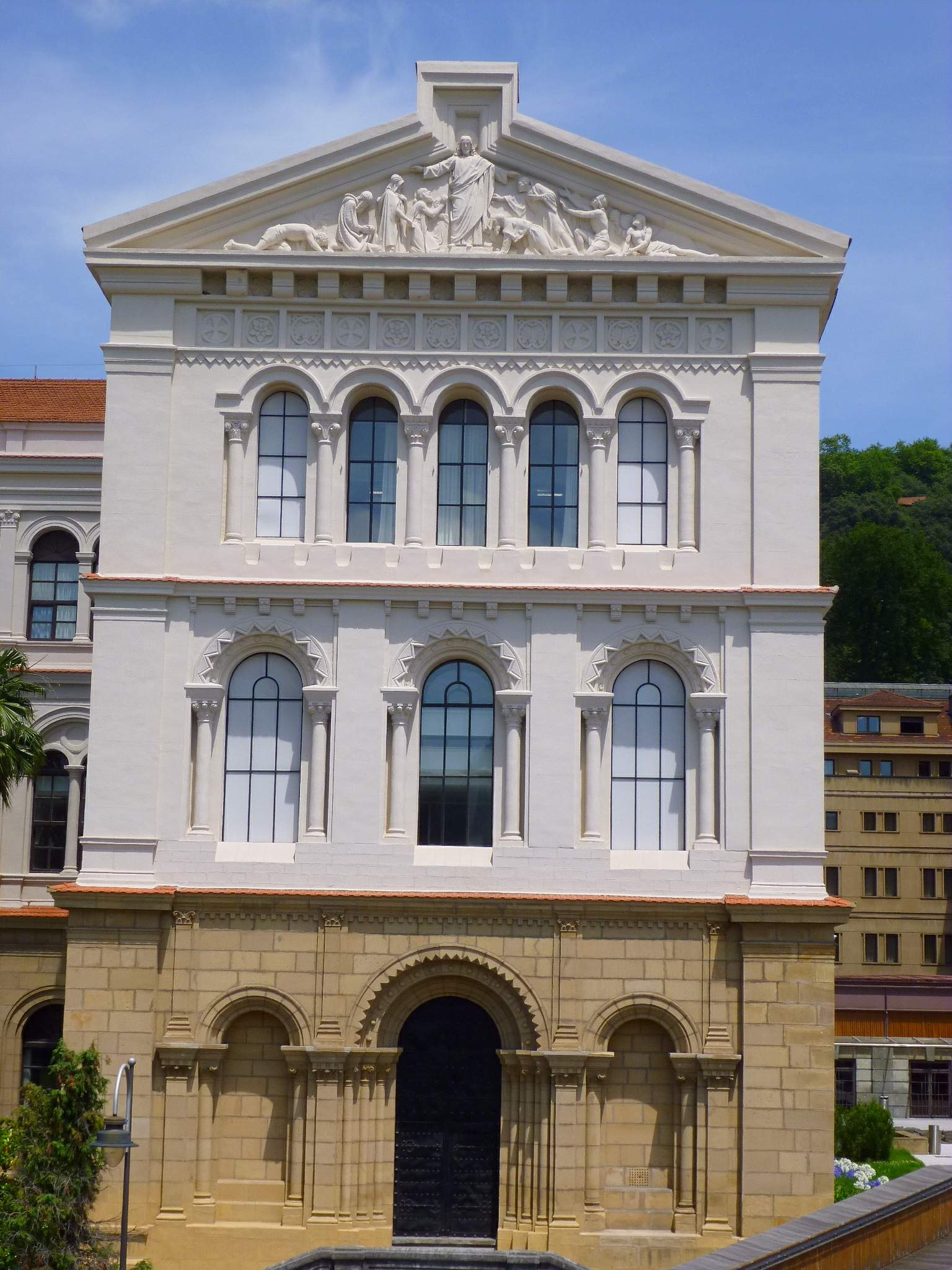
Deusto University

Cornelio Arellano married a Pamplonesa, Juana Dihinx Vergara (1872-1969); with her father, Pascual Dihinx Azcárate, also an engineer engaged in Hidraúlica de Moncayo and other companies, she was coming from the same bourgeoisie background. The newlyweds followed the professional lot of Cornelio; in the early 20th century they lived in Zaragoza, to settle in Madrid in the 1920s. The couple had 7 children, 5 of them boys. Juana came from the family cultivating the Basque heritage; Cornelio and Juana brought up the children in highly Catholic ambience. It is not known whether Luis frequented the schools in Madrid or elsewhere, though he enrolled at the Jesuit University of Deusto in Bilbao. He graduated in law and economics at unspecified time in the late 1920s. In February 1936 he married María Dolores Aburto Renobales (?-2004), descendant to a wealthy bourgeoisie Biscay family. Her father, Eduardo Aburto Uribe, was engineer involved in number of provincial industrial enterprises, shareholder of many Biscay mining and metalworking companies, and alcalde of Getxo between 1916 and 1920. Luis and María had 4 sons; active in business, they did not engage in politics. Many of Luis' siblings were active in Traditionalism. Two of his younger brothers were executed by Republican militia in the Bilbao Ángeles Custodios prison; an older one was later to become a Jesuit priest and another one a construction engineer. His sister María Teresa worked as a Carlist nurse during the Civil War.

== Republic ==
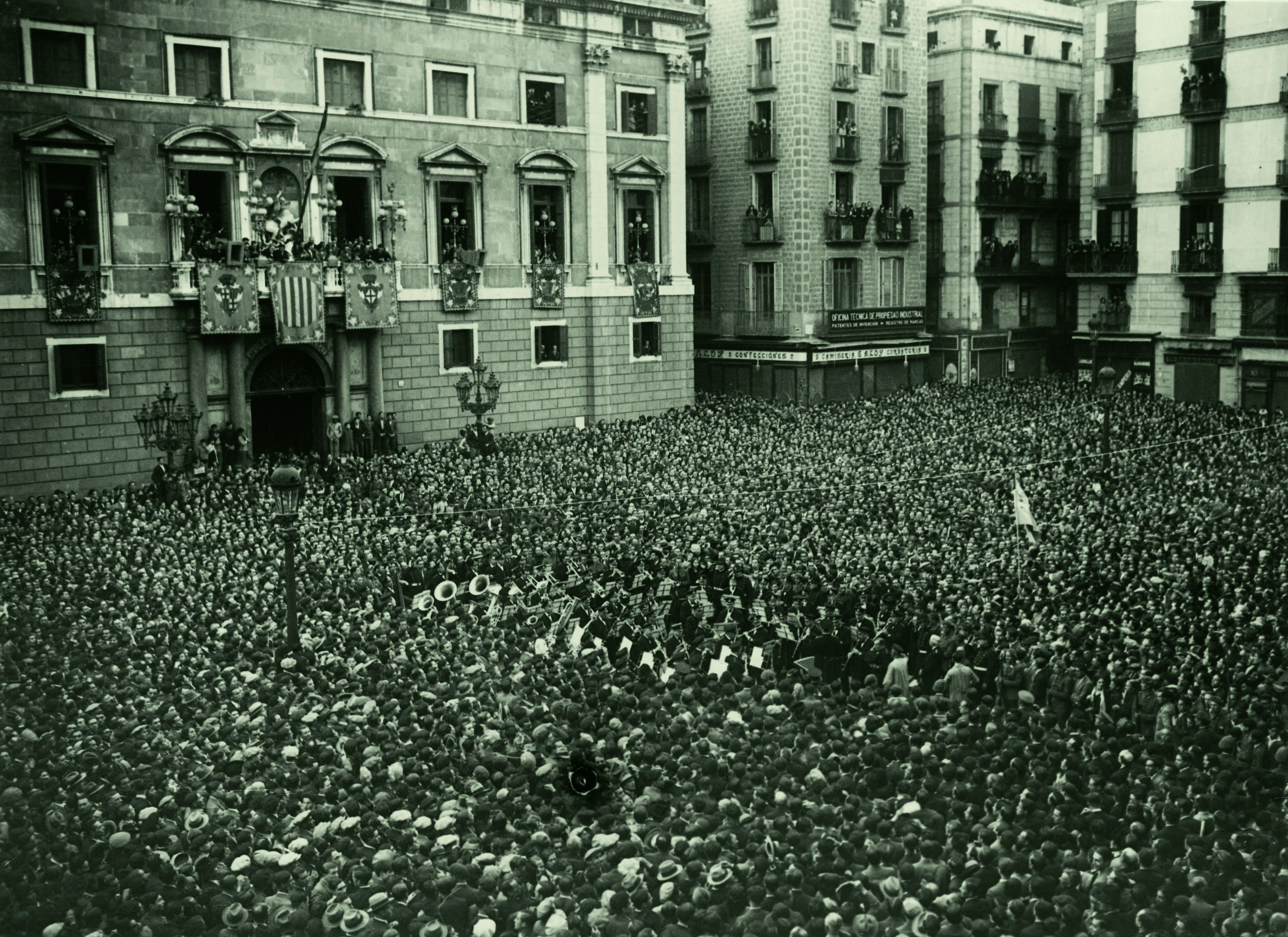
Republic declared, 1931

Luis is probably first noted as active within the public realm during the first electoral campaign of the Republic in 1931; engaged in Juventud Tradicionalista, he kept delivering harangues in favor of Carlist candidates in small locations like Sangüesa in Eastern Navarre. Already the following year he was recorded busy in Carlist propaganda beyond his native region, speaking at various meetings during Gran Setmana Tradicionalista in Catalonia. During that period he must have approached Tomás Domínguez Arévalo, the Carlist national political leader, 24 years his senior but native of Villafranca, just 9 km away from Caparroso. When discussing the 1933 events scholars already refer to Arellano as Arévalo's protégé; indeed conde Rodezno remained Arellano's mentor for the next 20 years.

During the 1933 electoral campaign, Arellano was included as Carlist candidate on the Navarrese Union of the Right coalition; he was comfortably elected with 72 thousand votes and together with José Luis Zamanillo became one of the youngest Traditionalist deputies ever. In great national politics Arellano followed Rodezno and his policy of seeking alliance within a broad monarchist grouping, first in coalition named as TYRE and later having signed manifiesto constitutivo of Bloque Nacional; he remained active in the latter despite discouragement from the emerging Carlist leader, Manuel Fal Conde. Another thread of his activity was a penchant for social focus. In the early 1930s Arellano was already engaged in rural arbitration bodies like Jurado Mixto del Trabajo Rural and Catholic-sponsored labor organizations like Federación Católico-Social Navarra and Sindicatos Obreros Profesionales. Partially as representative of these organizations he entered Grupo Social Parlamentario. Finally, in the Cortes he was very active fighting comisión gestora and demanding re-establishment of Diputación Foral de Navarra.

Carlist standard

Following deposition of Rodezno Arellano continued as a rising star in the movement; despite his status of Rodezno's companion, he remained on good terms with the Carlist leader Fal Conde. As part of re-modeling of the party command structures, in 1934 Arellano was appointed jefe of the newly created Youth Section; initially he controlled Juventud Tradicionalista, student AET and paramilitary Requeté organizations, though there was another separate section soon created for the militia later on. At that time he seemed a bit of a pivotal figure, in-between possibilist Rodezno's strategy and the intransigence of Fal. He continued within Bloque Nacional until Fal ordered termination of the alliance. By some scholars he is quoted as a speaker endorsing violent subversive anti-Republican strategy and contributing to belligerent spirit; others consider him representative of the new Carlist generation, already inclined towards authoritarianism. In 1936 he was re-elected to the Cortes from the same Navarrese constituency.

== Insurgency and unification ==
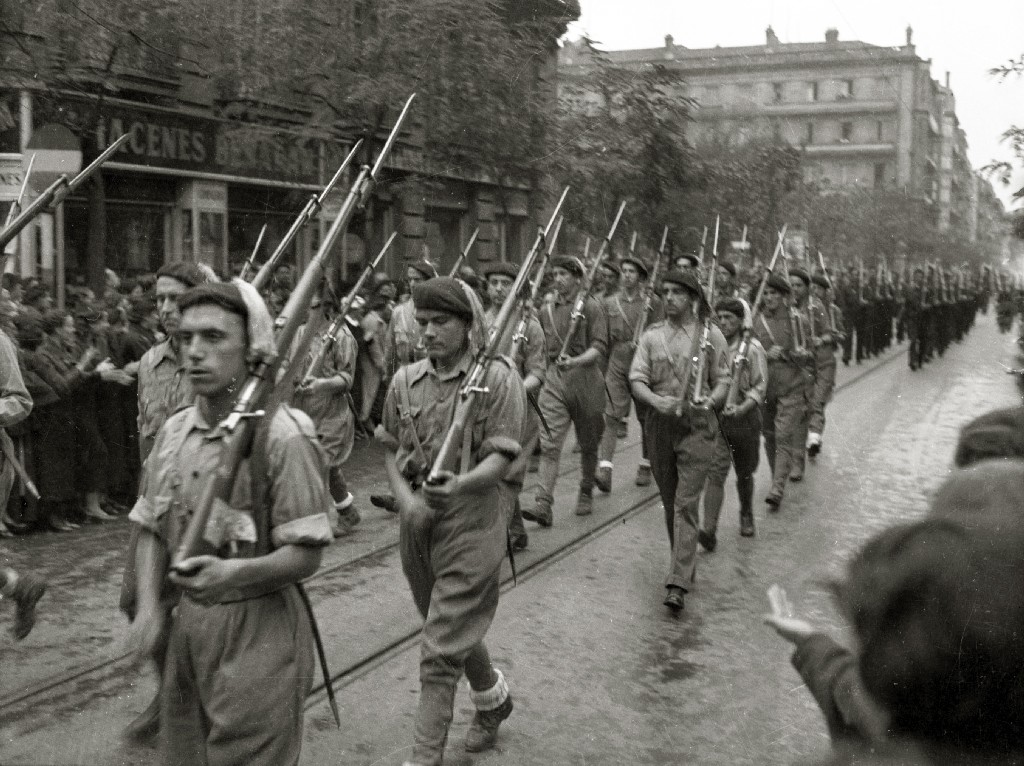
requetés, 1936

Arellano was heavily involved in conspiracy to overthrow the Republic; during the hectic July 1936 last-minute political negotiations between Carlist leadership and the army conspirators he sided against Fal and with the Rodeznistas, pressing almost unconditional support of the military. As Rodezno's confidant he formed a pressure group which travelled to France to seek authorization from the envoy of the claimant, Don Javier. The approval, though given hesitantly, proved crucial in outmaneuvering Fal, who insisted that the generals accept the Carlist conditions first.

During initial days of the insurgency Arellano stayed in Pamplona, mostly co-ordinating recruitment to the Carlist militia. Some time in late July he joined the Requeté himself; he served as junior officer in Sierra de Guadarrama. According to accounts available he acted as a liaison officer, travelling almost every day to Navarre and back until mid-August 1936, when he assisted his sister and mother, released from prison in the Republican zone, to settle in Pamplona. In the summer of 1936 the Navarrese Junta Central Carlista de Guerra delegated him to Gabinete de Prensa of Junta de Defensa Nacional; in early 1937 he entered Delegación de Cuestiones Sociales set up by Junta Central. Some sources claim he was definitely withdrawn from the frontline in the rank of a captain in the first days of 1937 and indeed in January he was again in Pamplona.

When pressure on unification started to mount Arellano again sided with Rodezno; by some scholars he is even considered co-leader of the Rodeznistas, pressing compliance and advocating the Carlist entry into a new partido unico. During charged meetings of February, March and April he enjoyed "voz cantante" when pushing the intransigent Fal into minority. Conscious of Carlist junior position within the coalition, he argued that sacrifice of the Requeté should not be wasted by allowing total Falangist predomination in a new monopolist state party. Even in case its program had little to do with Traditionalist ideario, he calculated that after the war Carlism would regain the lost ground. Apparently he did not realize the terms of forthcoming amalgamation; in the last-minute attempt as representative of Carlist labor structure Obra Nacional Corporativa Arellano was delegated to negotiate unification conditions.

Falangist standard

In April 1937 Arellano formed part of the pressure group which visited the regent-claimant and Fal in Saint-Jean-de-Luz and presented them with sort of an ultimatum, forcing Don Javier and his jefe delegado into silence. Viewed favorably in Franco headquarters, he was however not member of the close circle informed about the date of the forthcoming Unification Decree. The document nominated him into Secretariat, executive of the newly created Falange Española Tradicionalista; within this 10-member body Arellano was one of 4 Carlists nominated, becoming top dignitary of the just emergent Francoist regime.

== Early Francoism ==
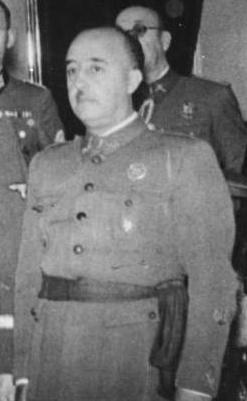
Franco, 1940

Though in the Carlist media Arellano was one of the faces of unification, he was amazed by declared terms of the process; immediately following Decreto de Unificación he travelled to Franco to voice his disgust. Bombarded with queries and protests from Carlists who found themselves marginalized in FET, after 3 months he and Rodezno ceased to take part in what they considered largely fictitious meetings of the Secretariat. Their relations with Don Javier remained extremely tense yet not broken; it was only after in November 1937 Arellano had accepted seat in a 50-member Consejo Nacional that the claimant declared him one of key rebels against his authority and expulsed them from Comunión Tradicionalista.

Arellano together with López Bassa co-headed Comisión de Organización Sindical, set up by the Falangist Secretariato; the body was entrusted with drafting theoretical framework for labor organization in the new regime. At this position Arellano pursued a Traditionalist corporative vision, but he was confronted by hard-line Falangist members like Joaquín Miranda and Pedro González Bueno, who advanced their idea of sindicatos verticales. As in December 1937 the Secretariat ceased to function and Arellano moved to new job, his plans were eventually dumped. When in early 1938 Rodezno assumed Ministry of Justice in the first Francoist government, Arellano followed him as sub-secretary - the post initially offered to José María Valiente, but rejected - and held it until the cabinet was reorganized and Rodezno replaced by Esteban Bilbao in August 1939; 70 years later this service cost him charge of committing crimes against humanity He was getting increasingly disillusioned with the new party, trying to save what was left of Carlist assets and becoming shareholder of El Pensamiento Navarro, spared amalgamation by turning it into a commercial newspaper. During his last months in Consejo Nacional he tried to oppose regulations aiming at total state control of the economy. As his mandate was not renewed, in the early 1940s he fell out of the Francoist political elite.

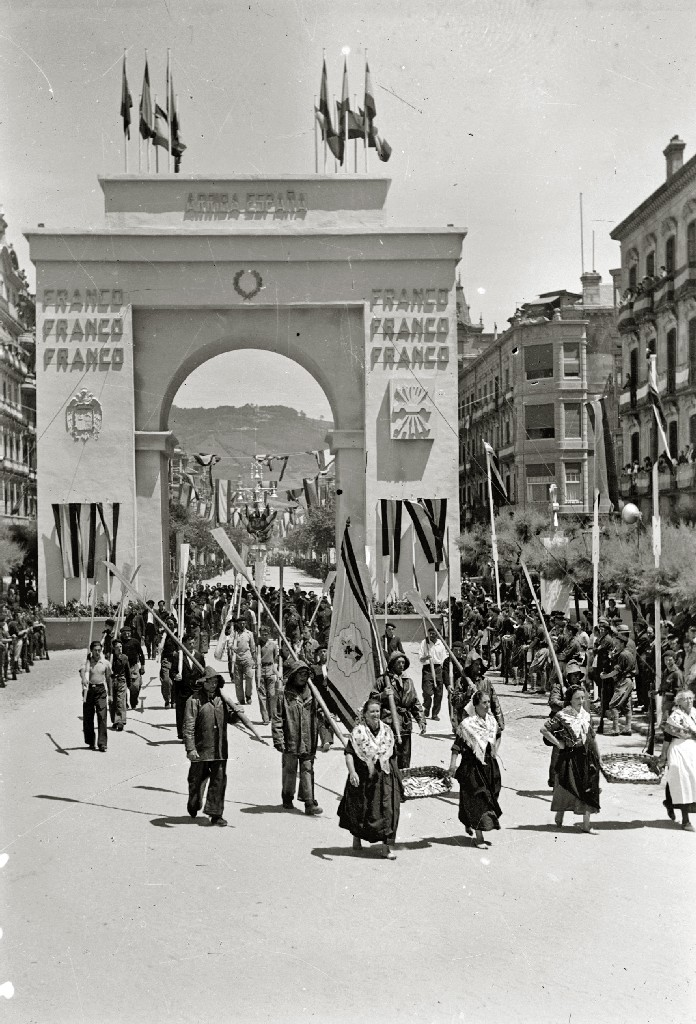
early Francoism

Little is known about Arellano's public activity in the 1940s; holding no official posts he remained an important figure in Navarrese political realm, especially that his promoter Rodezno was at that time vice-president of Diputación Provincial. Apart from his engagement in private businesses, Arellano was legal assessor of the Navarrese self-government, got involved in work on setting up Institución Príncipe de Viana and remained busy assembling compilation of traditional local regulations, commissioned by the Diputación. In the mid-1940s he was involved in promotion of fuerista establishments, climaxing in congress of regionalist lawyers in Montserrat. Though outside intransigent Carlism headed by don Javier, he remained one of key figures in the wider Traditionalist realm. Along Rodezno he formed the faction advocating that don Juan, son of the deposed Alfonso XIII, is considered a legitimate Carlist heir. Among other so-called Juanistas Arellano visited him in the Estoril residence in 1946. He co-drafted Bases de Estoril, a document signed by don Juan; though very much embracing Traditionalist principles, it fell short of declaring him the legitimate Carlist pretender.

== Mid-Francoism ==
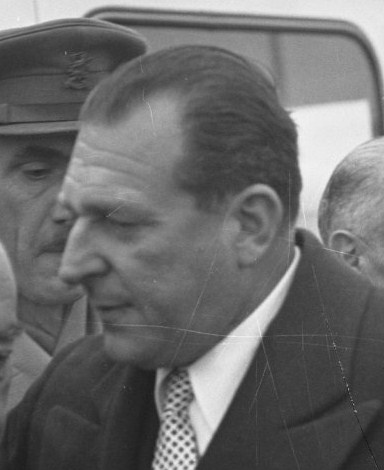
Don Juan, 1950s

Following failed 1949 Cortes attempt in 1951 Arellano got voted into the Pamplona ayuntamiento and was accordingly entrusted with assignments to numerous municipal initiatives, like Caja de Ahorros Municipal de Pamplona. Following the 1952 death of Rodezno many looked to Arellano as to the next informal leader of collaborative pro-Juanista Carlists; possibly to enhance his position, Franco awarded him with the prestigious Gran Cruz Meritísima de la Orden de San Raimundo de Peñafort and in 1952 appointed to Cortes Españoles, the Francoist quasi-parliament. In 1953 Arellano was admitted by Franco during a personal audience. Re-emergent position enabled him to engage successfully in prolonged effort to repel the Falangist takeover of the local Navarrese administration; the conflict climaxed in 1954 when the Falangist Gobernador Civil, Luis Valero Bermejo, requested that Ministry of Interior administers special measures against Arellano. The showdown ended with Bermejo recalled to Madrid and total victory of the Navarrese.

Active within a broad Carlist realm, Arellano pursued an ambiguous and complex policy. Within Navarre he tried to counter the influence of Fal Conde by supporting the iconic local Baleztena family, generally loyal to Don Javier but displaying a fairly independent stand. On the national scene he did not succeed Rodezno as key carlo-franquista, the role assumed rather by Esteban Bilbao and Antonio Iturmendi. He did, however, emerge as leader of the Juanistas. When the Javierista cause got reinvigorated by the 1957 fulminant appearance of Don Carlos Hugo during the annual Montejurra gathering, the Juanistas mounted a counter-action; late that year Arellano presided over delegation of 50-odd Carlists who visited Don Juan in his Estoril residence and declared him legitimate Carlist successor. Arellano himself entered the Private Council of the pretender. In 1958 together with the Minister of Interior Camilo Alonso Vega he engineered a scheme to control the successive Montejurra gathering. Potential attendants from beyond Navarre were banned from travelling and Arellano himself appeared during the feast. The plot backfired; angry Javierista youth threatened Arellano, who had to leave protected by Guardia Civil; Montejurra became a promotional stage for Carlos Hugo during the next 10 years.

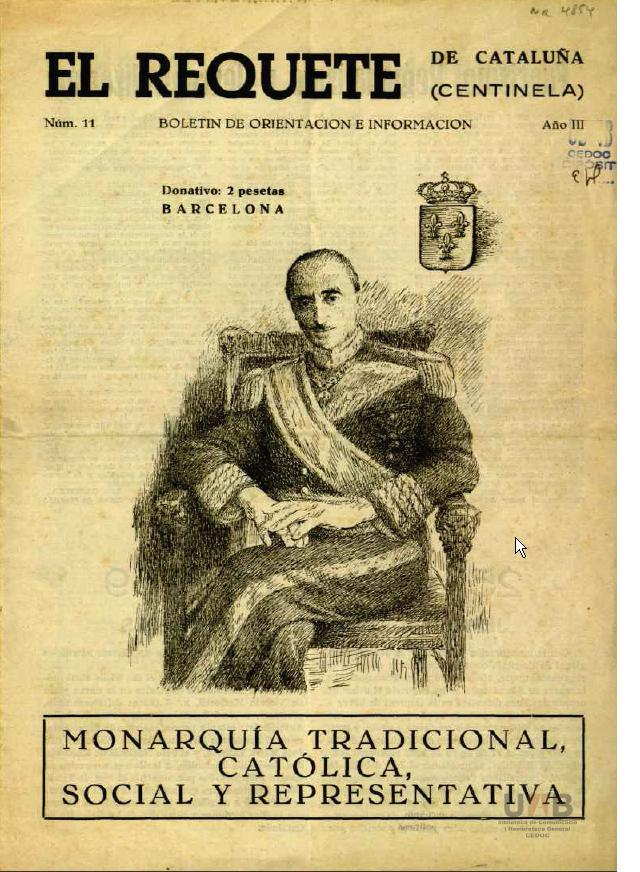
Don Javier as king, 1959

At the turn of the decades Arellano remained one of key Navarrese politicians. Though no longer member of Consejo Nacional, he was assured seat in the Cortes from the pool reserved for personal Franco's appointees; until mid-1960s he was not acknowledged as taking part in major legislative work or any related back-stage political haggling between different Francoist pressure groups. In 1960 he was involved in promoting so-called Fuero Recopilado de Navarra, a legislative attempt launched by Diputación Foral and aiming at consolidation of Navarrese civil code and its integration into the Spanish legal framework; he served as a liaison between the Navarros and Minister of Justice Iturmendi. Within the process he formally represented Pamplona lawyers, as he grew to dean of the bar association of the Navarrese capital. As a lawyer he was also involved in a number of commercial enterprises, like Goysa-Walsh, Fuerzas Eléctricas de Navarra, El Irati and others.

== Last years ==
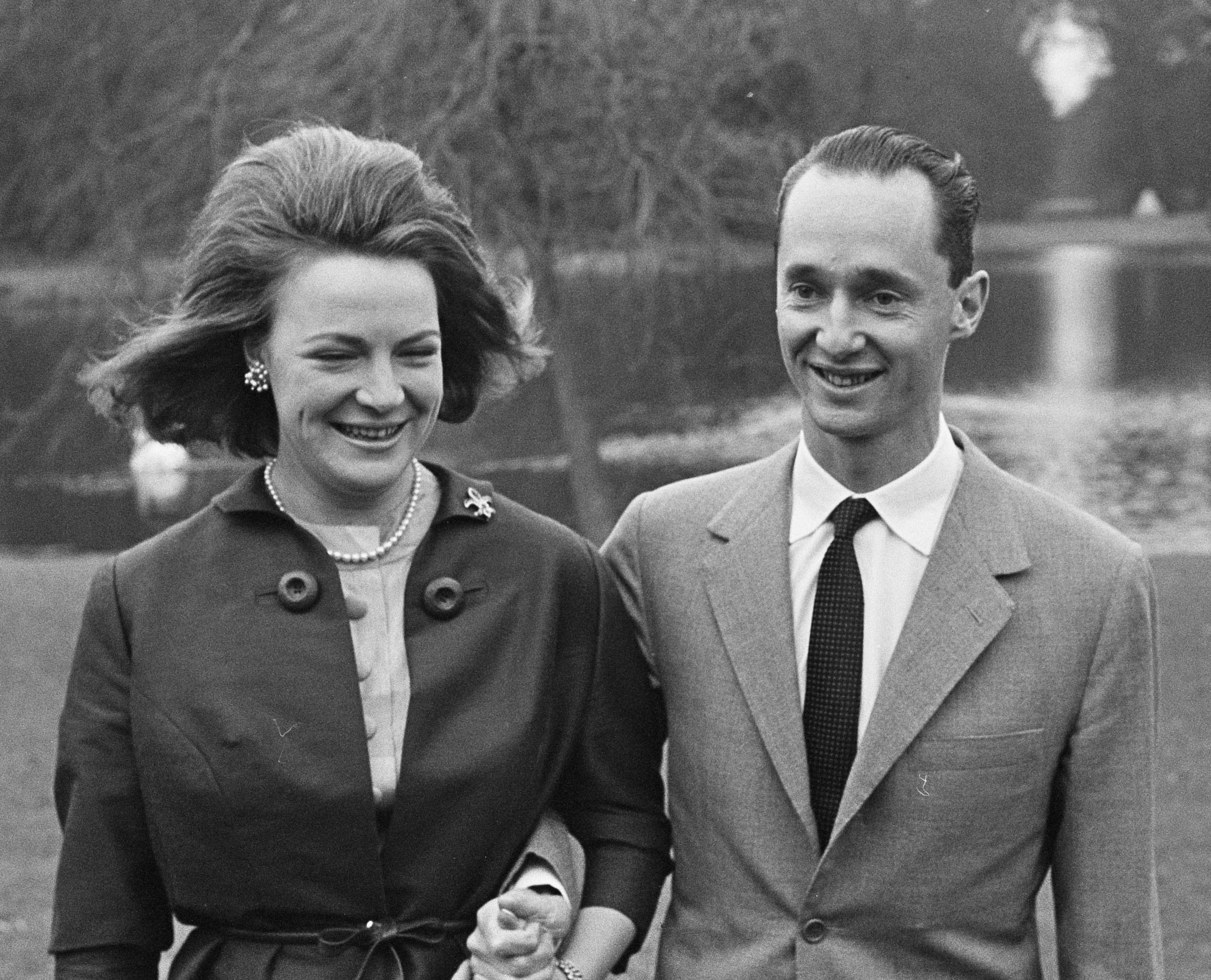
Irene and Don Carlos Hugo, 1964

In the early 1960s Don Carlos Hugo posed as a Francoist; his supporters pursued a policy of approaching the Falangist syndicalists, attempting to firmly mount the prince in political milieu of the regime and to enhance his chances of becoming a Francoist monarch in the future. When executing the strategy they tried to engage Carlists well adapted within the regime. It is not clear why Arellano, member of Don Juan's private council and a leading Carlist Juanista, fell into this trap. During the 1963 Sanfermines he agreed to host Princess Irene in what was a carefully planned Huguista plot. The event was staged as if she and Don Carlos Hugo had first met there, a romantic gloom envisioned as a marketing trick to attract attention of national media. The maneuver was repeated in 1964, again with Arellano engaged. Following running of the bulls - with Don Carlos Hugo taking part in a carefully arranged publicity stunt – Arellano attended an evening cocktail party to honor the prince. However, events got out of control; young Huguistas, unaware of the plot, assaulted Arellano in the Tres Reyes hotel lobby, which terminated his brief rapprochement with the Javieristas.

With his Cortes ticket renewed as Franco's appointee in 1961 and 1964, in the mid-1960s Arellano turned into a slightly more active member of the legislative. He entered Comisión de Leyes Fundamentales, discussed new Ley Orgánica del Movimiento and engaged in work on law on religious liberties; all of them were increasingly watering down authoritarian model of the regime, though Arellano was probably lacking sufficient political weight to engage in the backstage political wrestling.

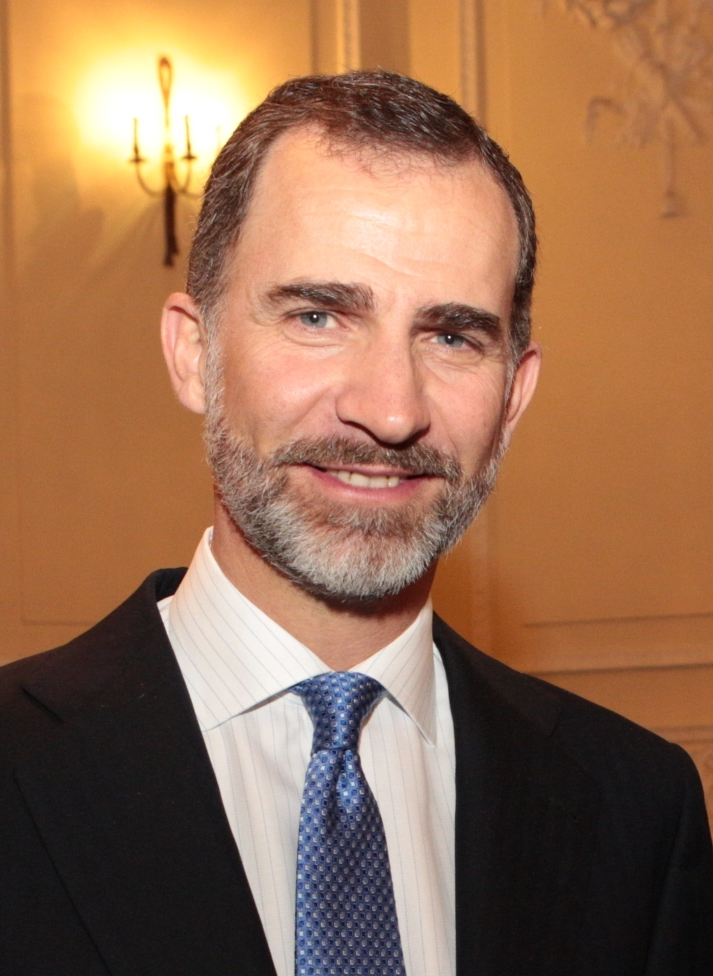
Don Felipe 2015

In 1966 Arellano received serious injuries in a traffic incident in Pamplona; apart from minor fractures, he suffered broken collar bones. It is not clear whether the fact that in 1967 Franco did not prolong his Cortes mandate and Arellano terminated his already 15-year-long parliamentarian service was anyhow related to his deteriorating health. Still loyal to Don Juan and still member of his Private Council, he was invited to major events in family of the Alfonsine claimant, like the 1967 wedding of his oldest daughter, Pilar de Borbón, and especially to the 1968 christening of his first grandson, Felipé. Shortly before death he was admitted to Consejo General de la Abogacía Española; shortly after his death he was named hijo predilecto by the province of Navarre.

== See also ==
- Carlism
- Carlo-francoism
- Francoism
- Don Javier
- Don Juan
- Tomás Domínguez Arévalo
