= El Debate (Spain) =

Spanish Catholic newspaper

El Debate is a Spanish Catholic daily newspaper, that was originally published in Madrid between 1910 and 1936. It was the most important Catholic newspaper of its time in Spain. It was relaunched in 2021 as an online publication.

== History and profile ==
El Debate was founded in 1910 by Guillermo de Rivas during the controversy originated by the so-called Padlock Bill, against the establishment of any more religious orders in Spain. It suffered a very unsuccessful management during its first months and it was sold to Ángel Herrera Oria and his Asociación Católica Nacional de Propagandistas (ACNdP). Herrera Oria edited the newspaper from 1911 to 1933. Its headquarters was in Madrid.

Ideologically, El Debate was very conservative and clerical, and journalistically it was very modern. The paper imported journalistic techniques from the United States and in 1926 opened the first Journalism School of Spain. It was the first newspaper with specific sport information. During the dictatorship of Miguel Primo de Rivera (1923–1930) El Debate supported the previous censorship in order to protect religious, moral and juridical values. When the Second Republic was proclaimed, the newspaper declared its compliance to the new regime, although this annoyed many of its monarchist readers.

During the Second Republic (1931–1936) the government suspended its activity several times. The paper supported the Spanish Confederation of the Autonomous Right (CEDA), the rightist and possibilist coalition that won election in 1933. After the beginning of the Civil War, the facilities were the newspapers of the ACNdP publishing house, Editorial Católica, were printed, were confiscated by the Communist Party of Spain and Republican Left. While the Communist voice, Mundo Obrero, was printed using the material of Ya, a little pre-war newspaper, Política, the voice of Republican Left took El Debate ones. In 1939 the Francoist government did not give permission for the reestablishment of El Debate, and Editorial Católica re-issued Ya, a newspaper with less political significance, that was the actual heir of El Debate.

== Website ==
El Debate, launched in 2021, styles itself as the heir to the newspaper. It is operated by the Catholic Association of Propagandists (the former ACNdP). In 2024, Ramón Pérez-Maura was chief of the editorial page.

== Bibliography ==
- Artola, Miguel (ed.): Enciclopedia de Historia de España, Madrid: Alianza, V, pp. 387–388
