= Ángel Herrera Oria =

Spanish journalist, Roman Catholic politician and cardinal

His Eminence Ángel Herrera Oria Servant of God
- Bishop Emeritus of Málaga
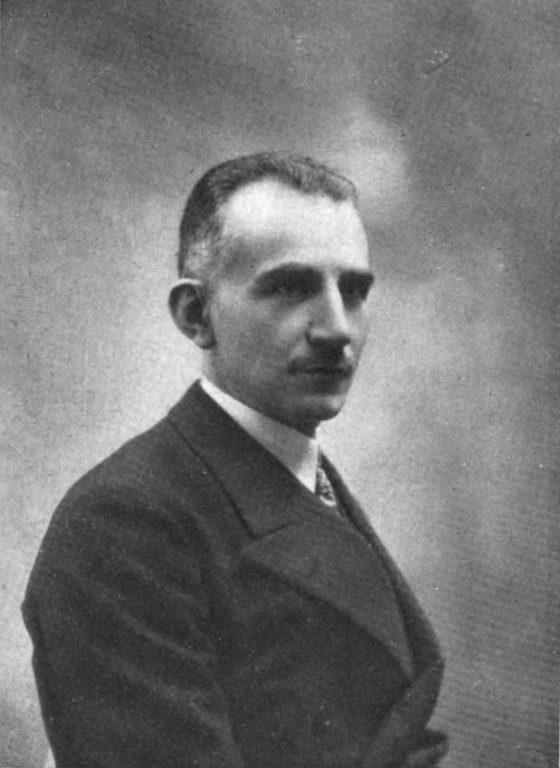
- Church: Roman Catholic Church
- Archdiocese: Granada
- Diocese: Málaga
- See: Málaga
- Installed: 12 October 1947
- Term ended: 19 August 1966
- Predecessor: Balbino Santos y Olivera
- Successor: Emilio Benavent Escuín
- Other post: Cardinal-Priest of Sacro Cuore di Maria (1965-1968)
- Previous posts: President of the Central Board of Spanish Catholic Action (1933-1936); Coadjutor of Santa Lucia (1943-1947)

Orders
- Ordination: 28 July 1940
- Consecration: 30 June 1947 by Gaetano Cicognani
- Created cardinal: 22 February 1965 by Pope Paul VI
- Rank: Cardinal-Priest

Personal details
- Born: Ángel Herrera Oria; 19 December 1886 Santander, Cantabria, Spain
- Died: 28 July 1968 (aged 81) Madrid, Spain
- Denomination: Roman Catholic
- Education: University of Salamanca; University of Deusto; Complutense University of Madrid
- Motto: Orationi et ministerio Verbi ("Prayer and the ministry of the Word")

Styles of Ángel Herrera Oria
- Reference style: His Eminence
- Spoken style: Your Eminence
- Informal style: Cardinal
- See: Málaga (Emeritus)

Ordination history of Ángel Herrera Oria
History
Episcopal consecration
- Principal consecrator: Gaetano Cicognani (Titular Archbishop of Ancyra)
- Co-consecrators: José María Eguino y Trecu (Santander); Juan Hervás y Benet (Titular Bishop of Alinda)
Cardinalate
- Elevated by: Pope Paul VI
Episcopal succession
Bishops consecrated by Ángel Herrera Oria as principal consecrator
- Antonio Añoveros Ataún: 12 October 1952

Ángel Herrera Oria (19 November 1886 – 28 July 1968) was a Spanish journalist and Roman Catholic politician and later a cardinal. He established the Instituto Social León XIII (later renamed Fundación Pablo VI) to promote the social doctrine of the Roman Catholic Church and named it in honor of Pope Paul VI who elevated him to the rank of cardinal in 1965.

Oria's cause of beatification has commenced and he is therefore referred to as a Servant of God.

== Life ==
=== Early life and education ===
Ángel Herrera Oria was born in Spain on 19 November 1886 as the thirteenth of fifteen children to José Herrera Ariosa and Asunción Oria; four brothers became Jesuit priests while another joined the missions in China.

He completed his secondary studies with the Jesuit Fathers in Valladolid and studied law at the university of Deusto; he also studied for a licentiate in law in 1905 at the University of Salamanca and also attended the university of Fribourg in Switzerland for ecclesiastical studies from 1936 until 1940.

Oria entered the State Lawyers Corps in 1908 and was later sent to the Delegation of the Treasury in Burgos where he remained for a year. He returned to Madrid and entered the Marian Congregation of los Luises, directed by Jesuit Father Ángel Ayala. On 3 December 1909, he was named as the president of the recently founded Asociación Católica Nacional de Jóvenes Propagandistas. He also served as the director of El Debate from 1 November 1911 to 1933. He was the founder of Editorial Católica, of El Debate School of Journalism, of Confederación Nacional Católica Agraria, and of Centro de Estudios Universitarios e Instituto Social Obrero. Oria also partook in the formation of Pax Romana as well as in the initial steps of the Summer University of Santander. He served as the president of the Central Board of Spanish Catholic Action for three years from 1933 to 1936.

He co-founded and presided over the Asociación Católica Nacional de Propagandistas (ACNdP) (Propagandists Catholic National Association) from 1908 to 1935, and the rightist party Acción Nacional (named after Acción Popular) (1931), presided over Spanish Catholic Action (1933–1935), and edited the pre-Civil War's most important Catholic newspaper, El Debate from 1911 to 1933.

He studied law at the Universities of Salamanca and Deusto, and received his doctorate at the University of Madrid in 1908. That year, he co-founded, with the Jesuit Ángel Ayala, the ACNdP. In November 1911, he purchased El Debate, a Catholic newspaper established a year before, and he made of it one of the most read newspapers in Spain. In 1912, the ACNdP established the Editorial Católica, a leading Catholic publishing house during 20th century Spain. In 1926 he founded the first journalism school in Spain, associated with El Debate.

When the Second Republic was proclaimed, he founded the political party Acción Nacional (later named Acción Popular, as the government banned the usage of term 'national' by any political party). In 1933, he was elected president of Spanish Catholic Action and left editorship of El Debate. That same year, the ACNdP founded the Centro de Estudios Universitarios (CEU).
