= Unification Decree (Spain, 1937) =

Merge of two Spanish political parties

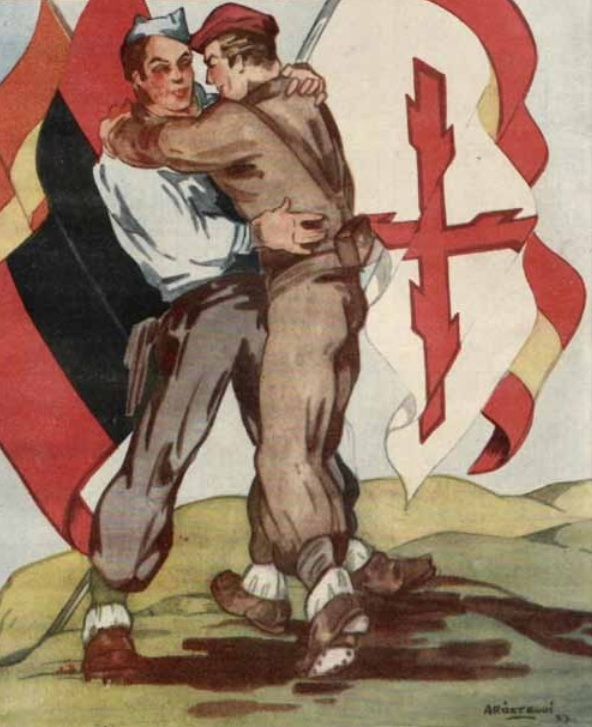
Propaganda drawing of the union between Falangists and Carlists. From the youth magazine Flechas, 1937

The Unification Decree was a political measure adopted by Francisco Franco in his capacity of Head of State of Nationalist Spain on April 19, 1937. The decree merged two existing political groupings, the Falangists and the Carlists, into a new party - the Falange Española Tradicionalista y de las Juntas de Ofensiva Nacional Sindicalista (FET y de las JONS). As all other parties were declared dissolved at the same time, the FET became the only legal party in Nationalist Spain. It was defined in the decree as a link between state and society and was intended to form the basis for an eventual totalitarian regime modeled after Fascist Italy and Nazi Germany. The head of state – Franco himself – was proclaimed party leader, to be assisted by the Junta Política and Consejo Nacional. A set of decrees which followed shortly after appointed members to the new executive.

The merger was imposed upon the Falange Española de las JONS and the Carlist Traditionalist Communion. Leaders of both parties – Manuel Hedilla of the Falange and Manuel Fal Conde of the Carlists – were outmaneuvered by Franco, who divided, deceived, and misled them and finally left them no option but to comply with unification on his own terms, and they along with other political opponents were subsequently marginalized. The Unification Decree ensured Franco's total political dominance and secured at least a formal political unity within the Nationalist zone, albeit not one of genuine affection. It in reality represented the absorption of Carlist offshoots into a subsequently domesticated and subordinated Falange. Most scholars consider unification to have been a stepping stone towards a semi-fascist state. This augmented Falange served as Spain's sole legal party for the next 38 years, becoming one of the instrumental pillars of Franco's regime.

== Background ==
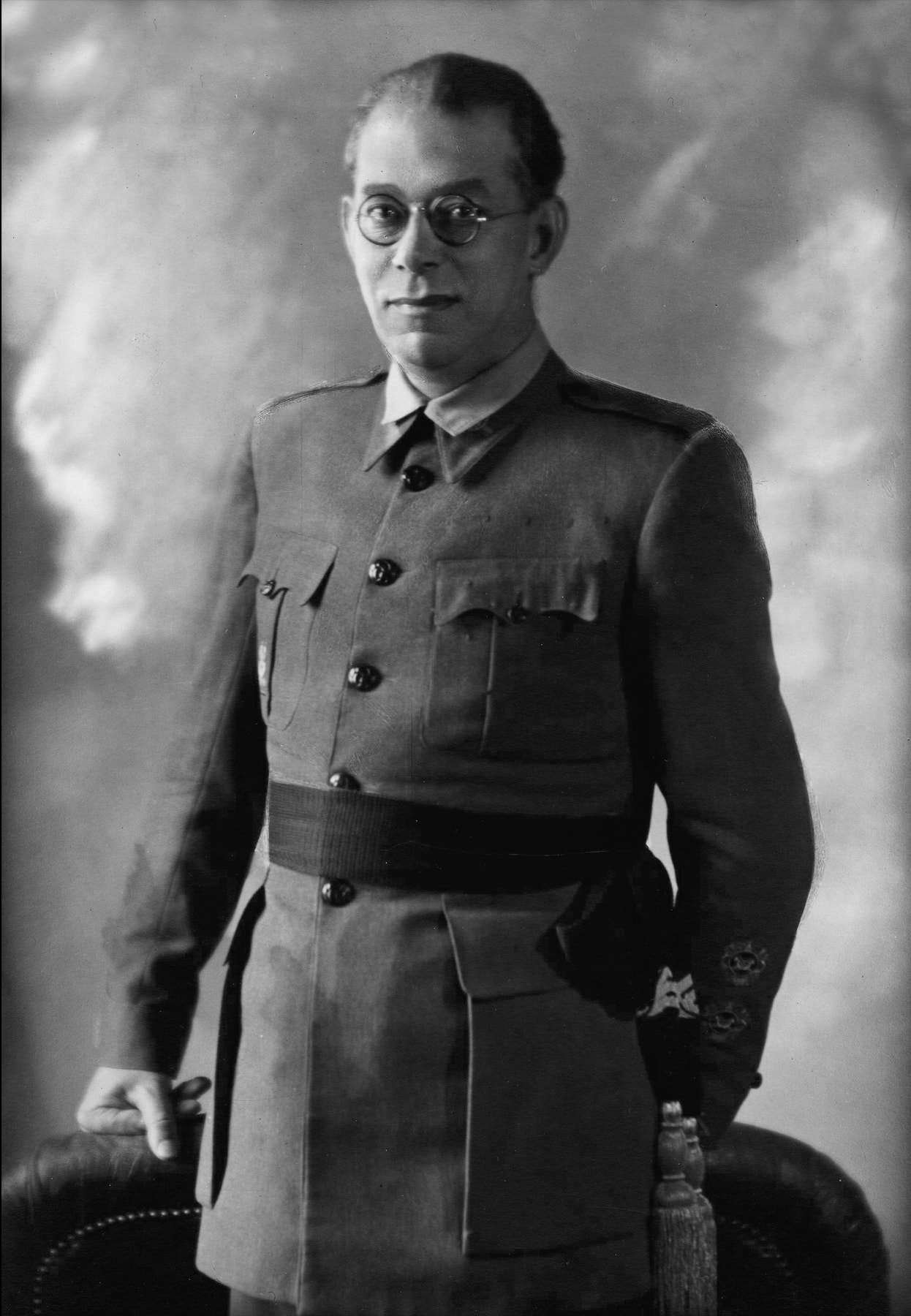
Emilio Mola, head of the military conspiracy

The military conspirators of 1936 did not produce any clear vision of a political regime which would follow the coup; in the short run, some administrative powers were to stay with provincial civil committees, composed of most representative or most committed individuals. The key right-wing factions in Spain were rather loosely involved in the plot, and almost none of them concluded a political agreement with the generals. The only party which did close a deal, the Carlists, secured an ambiguous agreement with the head of the conspiracy, General Emilio Mola; it specified terms of access to the coup rather than a future political regime. Initial statements issued by various generals during the first days of the following rebellion remained politically vague; on territories controlled by the rebels local commanders appointed mayors or auxiliary civilian bodies composed mostly of locally recognized right-wing personalities, typically those associated with CEDA, Alfonsism, Carlism, or the defunct Spanish Patriotic Union. The top executive body of the rebel government, the Junta de Defensa Nacional, was set up on July 23 as an instrument of administration and intendancy rather than politics. On July 30 the Junta declared martial law, which theoretically prevented any political activity. On September 13 the Junta issued a decree which dissolved all Popular Front parties and those opposed to "the patriotic movement". Soon afterwards it condemned "political partisanship" though not "specific ideologies", stating that the future government would introduce "the only politics and the only unionization possible" and prohibited all political or trade union activities.

This ban on political activity was not rigorously enforced on rightist organizations, but each of their fates differed significantly. The largest grouping, CEDA, which held 88 seats in the Cortes, had been gradually disintegrating since the February elections; its structures had partially collapsed, having been abandoned by militants disappointed with the movement's legalist strategy. In addition, its leader José María Gil-Robles y Quiñones declared the suspension of all CEDA political activity. Though some of CEDA heavyweights remained politically active, Juventudes de Acción Popular (JAP), CEDA's youth wing and formerly its most dynamic organ, reorganized in September 1936 as a paramilitary force with few thousand members. Renovación Española (13 mandates) and Partido Agrario (11 mandates) were also in decay, with the Alfonsists of RE in particular being preoccupied with engineering schemes related to Infante Juan, Count of Barcelona. The two groups on the right which did experience growth, and at a dramatic rate, were the Carlist Comunión Tradicionalista and the Falange Española de las JONS. Comunión Tradicionalista (10 mandates) openly operated its national and provincial war councils, its key asset being volunteer militia units, the Requetés, which in the first months of the war claimed 20,000 men. The Falange, which in February obtained only 0.4% of the votes and lost its previously held one seat in the Cortes, experienced enormous growth in subsequent months and would come to be the most dynamic of party on the right. Its party structures functioned without restriction; its Primera Línea militias recruited 35,000 volunteers in a short period.

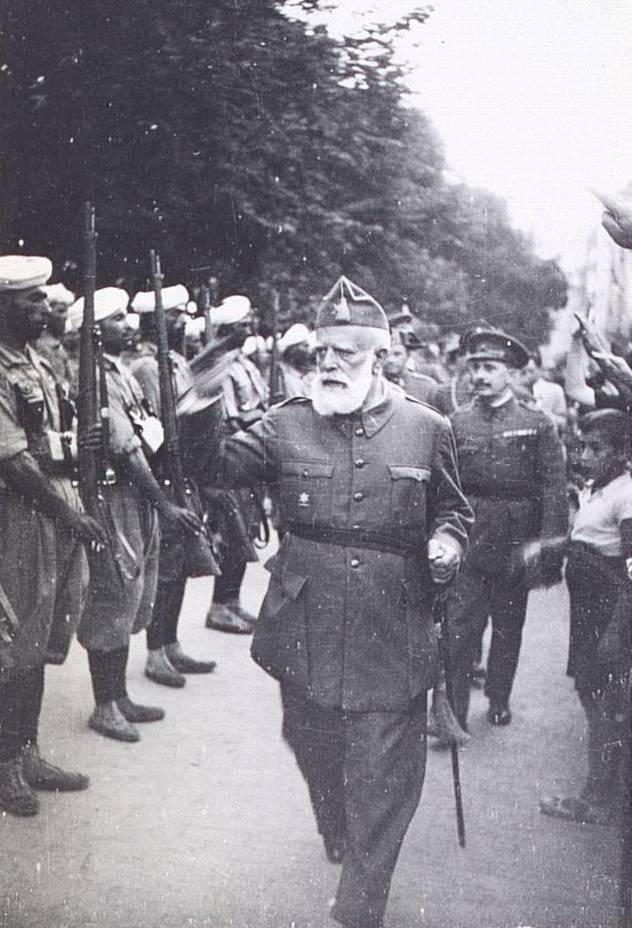
Miguel Cabanellas, head of Junta de Defensa

In early October 1936 supreme power in the rebel zone was assumed by Francisco Franco, who set up an executive administration named the Junta Técnica del Estado. The civilians appointed to head specific sections of this quasi-government "resembled the traditional Right" and were recruited from Alfonsist, Carlist, and other generic conservative ranks, with no specific party background prevailing. The regime permitted limited political proselytizing but kept politicians in check; CEDA head Gil-Robles was forced to remain in Portugal, Infante Juan, championed by the Alfonsists, was asked to leave Spain, Prince Xavier of Bourbon-Parma, the Carlist pretender to the throne, was permitted only a brief stay in Spain, and the leader of the Comunión Tradicionalista, Fal Conde, was exiled with inflated charges advanced. Military censorship prevented dissemination of pieces deemed excessively related to party propaganda and encouraged these kept within limits of general adhesion to the regime, e.g. Gil-Robles' order that JAP must fully follow military command or RE head Antonio Goicoechea's call for a "patriotic front". Franco himself kept meeting with right-wing politicians, usually ignoring the intransigent ones and speaking only to these deemed tractable. No political plans were discussed. In general, his guests were expected to mobilize civilian support for the regime with no political commitment offered in return, except that in an unspecified future "the people" would be free to decide the future regime of Spain.

== Falangists and Carlists ==
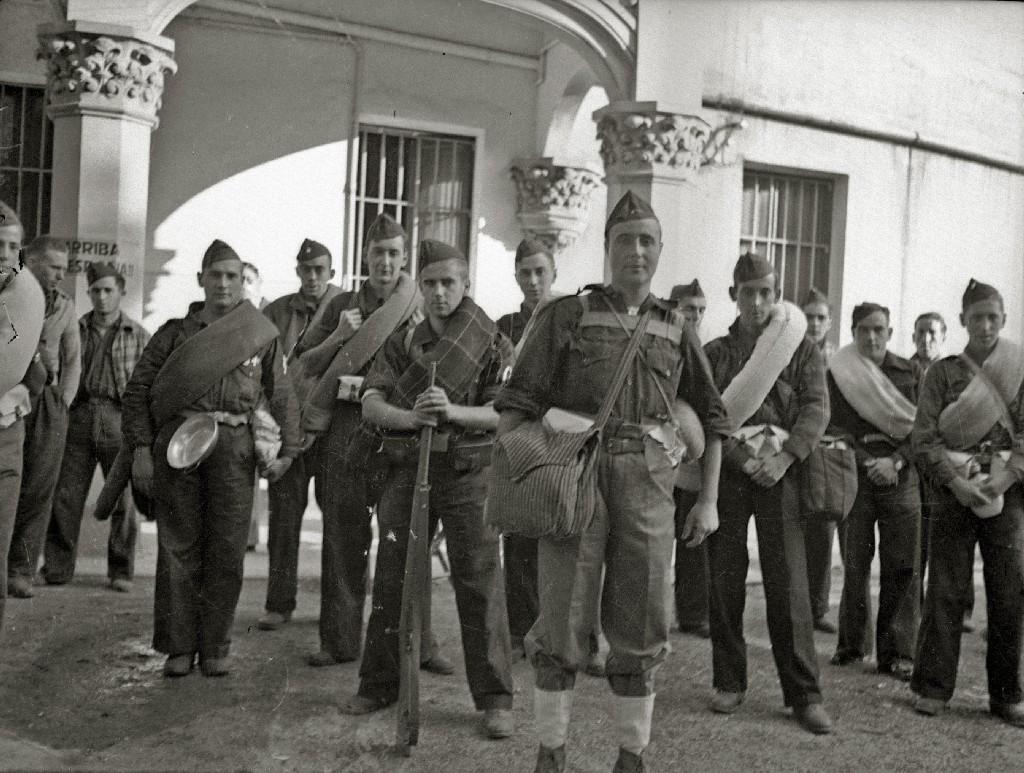
Falangist militia

Few months into the civil war it was already evident that the balance of power among right-wing parties underwent a major shake-up. The decomposed CEDA, Renovación and Agrarians were dwarfed by Comunión Tradicionalista and Falange Española, two groupings responsible for some 80% of volunteers in ranks of the Nationalist party militias. It was their efficiency as recruitment structures which mattered to Franco and the military. Initially volunteers constituted 38% of all troops available to the Nationalists on the peninsula; as conscription was getting implemented by November this figure went down to 25%. Both groupings were increasingly viewing themselves as future masters of new Spain. The Carlists considered themselves exclusive political partners of the military as agreed back in July 1936; they saw the Nationalist faction as basically a Carlist-military alliance. The Falangists saw the Nationalist effort very much in terms of a syndicalist revolution, with Falange the only genuine live political force amidst remnants of old, pathetically antiquated other parties. Both CT and FE considered the army – even though viewed with some suspicion as respectively liberal or reactionary – a necessary tool to gain control of all Spain, but they expected the army to be politically passive and each claimed exclusive right to define political content of the future state.

The most dynamic political power was Falange; a 1933-born third-rate party known mostly for street violence and as a point of reference for Spanish Fascism, in the atmosphere of rapid radicalization of 1936 it attracted tens and soon hundreds of thousands of mostly young people. With its leader José Antonio Primo de Rivera and many other top activists trapped in the Republican zone, in September 1936 Falange formed a provisional Junta de Mando composed of largely inexperienced young leaders and headed by Manuel Hedilla; the party kept developing its structures, building youth, female, children, propaganda, paramilitary, student, syndicate, sanitary and other sections. By late 1936 Falange supplied some 55% of all volunteers and clearly outpaced the Carlists; apart from former CEDA or Renovación militants, also some right-wing republicans started to join Falange in order to counterbalance the monarchist Carlists. Franco kept meeting Hedilla, listened to his advice and even made some effort to flatter him, yet he usually denied Hedilla's requests. The Falangist executive, itself divided mostly along personalist lines between Hedillistas and so-called “legitimists”, were getting increasingly frustrated about military domination; in early 1937 they empowered Hedilla to demand total political hegemony with military control reduced to the army and the navy. Moreover, in January the Junta reached to the German NSDAP and the Italian PNF seeking a political understanding behind the back of the military; they vaguely suggested that “Franco is [only] for today”.

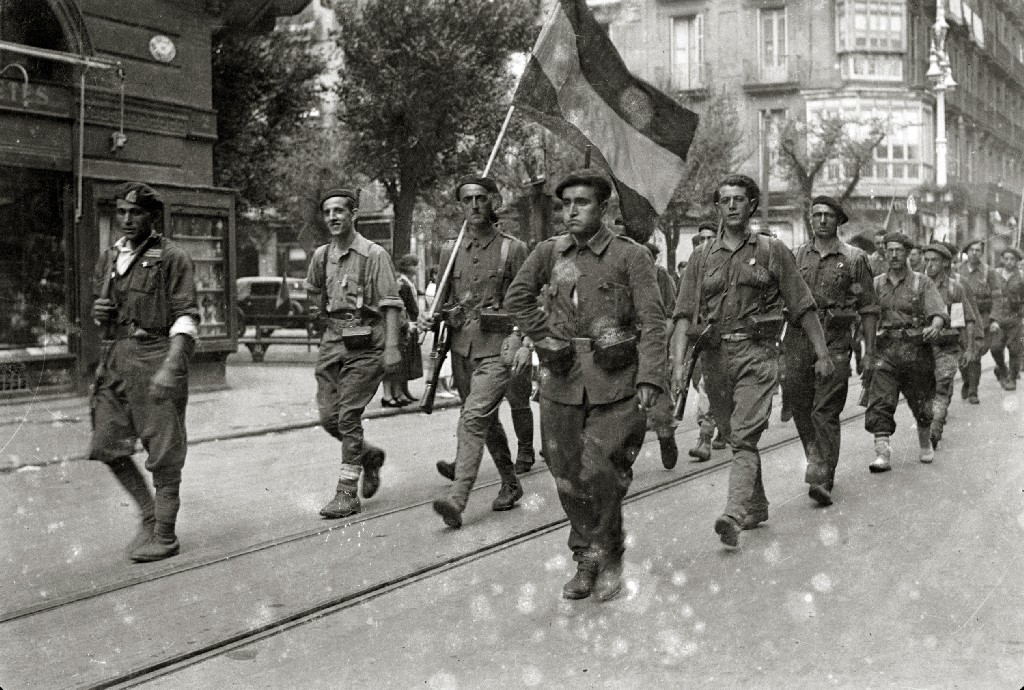
Carlist militia Requetés on parade, San Sebastián 1936

In the early 20th century Carlism was a second-rate force; like Falange it benefited from radicalization of the mid-1930s, though unlike Falange it enjoyed major appeal only in some regions of Spain. The Carlist pretender, the Austria-based Don Alfonso Carlos, perished in late September 1936 and was succeeded by a regent, France-based Don Javier. The latter met Franco twice in 1936 and both leaders remained highly skeptical about each other; Franco preferred to speak to the experienced Navarrese leader, conde Rodezno. Like Falange, the Carlists tried to make their best of the autonomy allowed by the military administration; in October 1936 their propaganda paid more attention to Don Javier assuming the regency than to Franco assuming the state jefatura, and in late 1936 headlines of Carlist press exalted the exiled leader Fal Conde as caudillo, reserving for Franco only small-font notes at the bottom of the page. In December the Carlists launched their own syndicalist scheme. In early 1937 Carlism started to demonstrate agglutinatory appeal; some CEDA politicians discussed merger, a small Partido Nacionalista Español merged indeed, an independent syndicalist organization CESE joined the Carlist Obra Nacional Corporative scheme and in some regions Acción Popular and Renovación sections fused with the Carlists. In Navarre the Carlists ran sort of an own state structure.

== First concepts of political unity ==
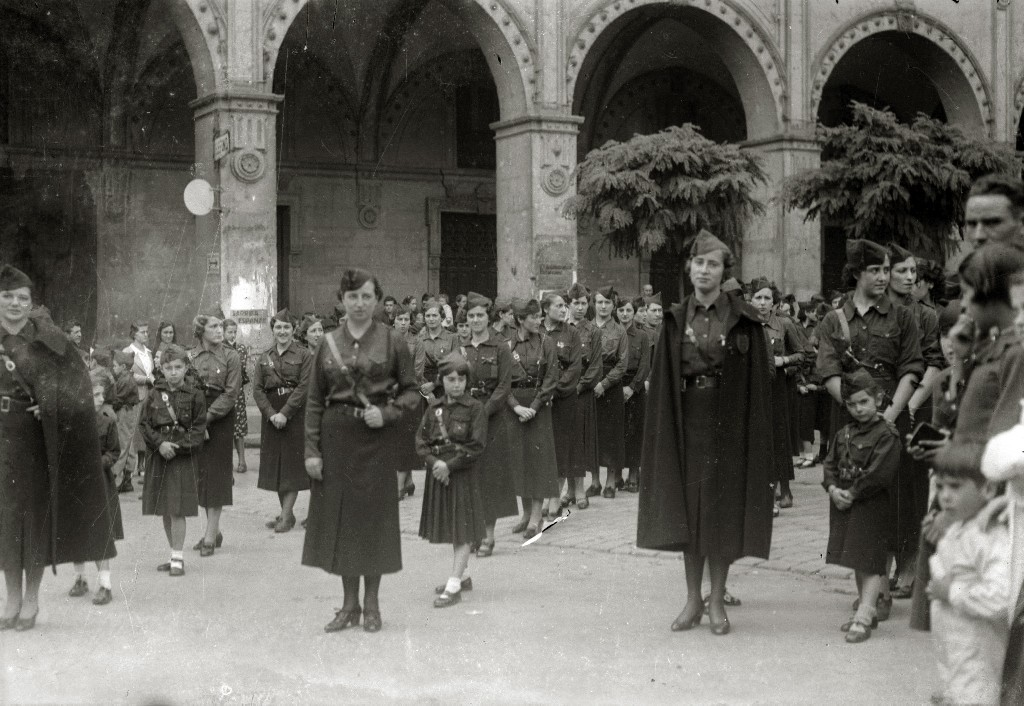
Members of Falangist women's branch, Sección Femenina

Initial statements of the military remained extremely vague politically, and frequently repeated phrases referring to patriotic unity resembled banal old-style clichés rather than an articulated political concept. Since right-wing parties were not dissolved by Junta de Defensa it might have been understood that some sort of limited multi-party regime might be maintained. As late as in September 1936 Franco declared that following military victory he would hand over power to “any national movement” supported by the people, which might have hinted at some electoral procedure and political competition. However, in October he started to make private comments about a possible forced political unification. Terms of such a unification remained extremely unclear; some like Goicoechea supported a general “patriotic front”, some suggested a personalist “Partido Franquista” and people in caudillo's close entourage like Nicolás Franco preferred rather a civic “Acción Ciudadana”. All these concepts were resemblant of Primo de Rivera state party, Unión Patriótica, the amorphous and bureaucratic structure built from scratch and organized around general values such as patriotism, discipline, work, law and order.

It is not clear whether Franco has ever considered seriously any of the above options; it seems that by late 1936 he started to opt for a different formula, based not on a general political amalgam but formatted along more specific lines. In November he confessed in private that perhaps the Falangist doctrine could be incorporated without the Falange. The same month in liaison with Hedilla he asked the party head of Servicio Exterior section to propose terms of would-be merger with the Carlists; there is no outcome known, though it is likely that he hinted at a would-be merger also to Rodezno. In December 1936 the military propaganda enforced the “Una Patria Un Estado Un Caudillo” slogan, made mandatory in sub-titles of all newspapers issued in the Nationalist zone, including the Falangist and the Carlist ones. By the same time the party militias were formally militarized and subjected to army control, even though their Falangist and Carlist political flavor was retained. In January 1937 Franco confirmed that the country would be able to elect any regime, though he also made references to “corporative state”; in private he confessed to an Italian envoy that he would found a political association, be its leader and endeavor to unite the parties. Some of these speaking to him noted he started to emphasize that current provisional status had to be replaced with some permanent solution. In February he also ventured to offer some thoughts on “ideologia nacional”; having ignored all other groupings he suggested it should possibly be founded on Falangism and Traditionalism, though he also rejected the idea of reproducing a Fascist scheme.

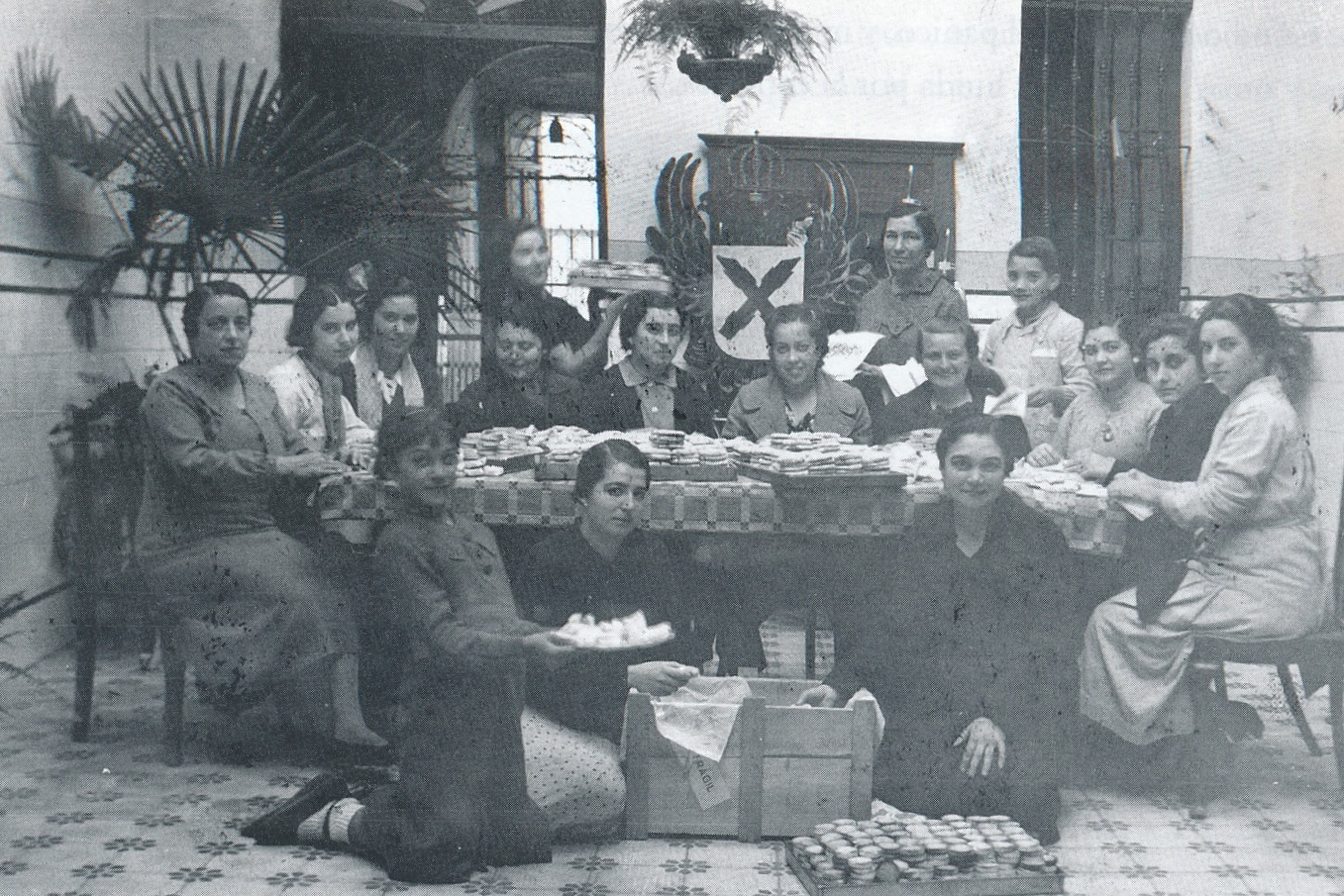
Members of Carlist women's branch, Margaritas

During late winter and early spring of 1937 Franco talked to Italian Fascist heavyweights Farinacci, Cantalupo and Danzi; all tried to inspire him towards a long-term solution modelled after Italy, based on the concept of a monopolist Partido Nacional Español state party. None was particularly impressed by Franco and they considered him politically bewildered; Farinacci noted with disgust that Franco uttered some disorganized phrases about a corporative state yet he could have not distinguished between the regimes in Italy, Austria, Portugal and Germany. It seems that at that time he expected that the Falangists and the Carlists would work out the merger terms themselves; in a letter to Rome Nicolás Franco claimed that both parties were in midst of negotiations, that the talks were going on well and that the major problem was Don Javier, unwilling to cede power. Contemporary scholar concludes that Franco considered the Falangists tamed and viewed the Carlists, as usual inflexible and intransigent, as the chief obstacle; he was also increasingly irritated by their “tono de soberanía”. However, he was also annoyed by socially radical Falangist propaganda; in February censorship scrapped publication of an earlier José Antonio's speech, which contained the promise of “dismantling capitalism”; few major Falangist politicians were briefly detained for trying to disseminate the print anyway.

== Failed unification from below ==
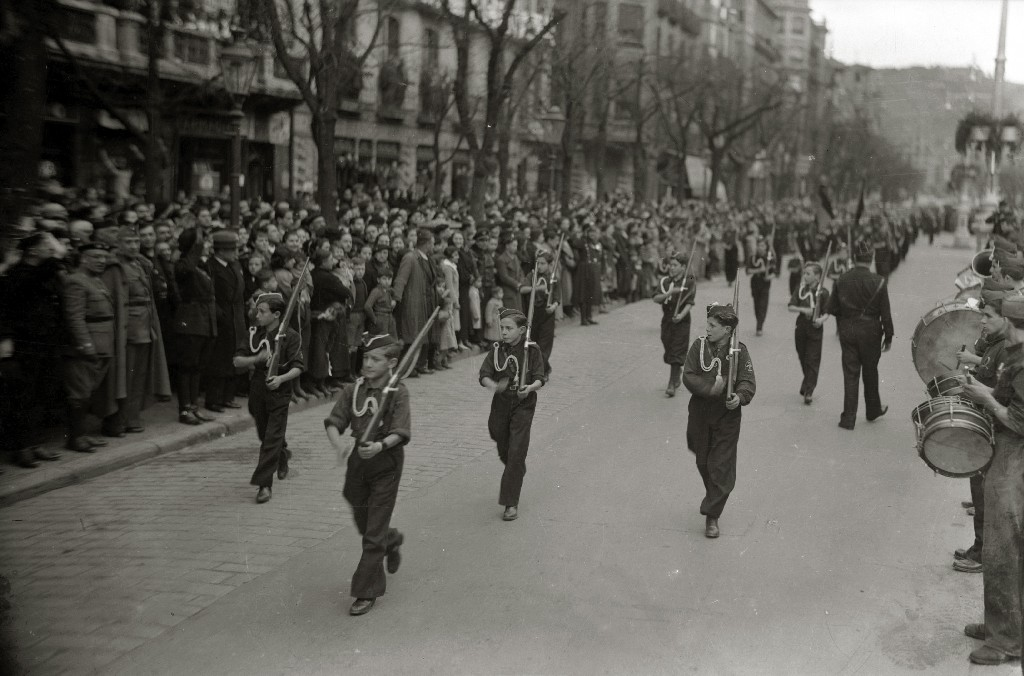
Members of Falangist youth branch, Flechas

Theoretical platforms of Falange and Comunión were strikingly distinct. The former advanced a syndicalist revolution and vehement Spanish nationalism, both to be incorporated in an omnipotent state; the latter were committed to a loose monarchy, society entrenched in traditional roles and de-centralized state accommodating local Basque and Catalan liberties. Though both were equally hostile to democracy, parliamentarism and socialism, they did not hold each other in high regard; the Falangists considered Carlism a half-dead prehistoric reactionary relic, while the Carlists viewed the Falangists simply as “red scum”. In practical terms after July 1936 relations between the two were ambiguous; technically allies within the Nationalist conglomerate, they nevertheless competed for posts, assets and recruits. While politicians and front-line militias remained on at least correct if not amicable terms, in the rear fistfights and clashes between Carlists and Falangists were by no means rare and at times they escalated into gunfights; they mutually sabotaged their rallies and denounced each other to military authorities.

Since late 1936 Carlist and Falangist leaders got wind of unification idea, vaguely nurtured by Franco. Unsure about its terms and whether resistance was a viable option, they concluded that a deal agreed by both parties might be better than a solution imposed by the military. Exchange of public statements at the turn of 1936 and 1937 immediately revealed major differences: an article by Carlist pundit presented both as partners, but in response Hedilla declared that Traditionalists were most likely to be absorbed by Falange. First informal consultation talks were staged by compromise-minded politicians in January 1937 and were re-opened in February, though in both parties there was little agreement about the strategy to be adopted. Within Carlism Rodezno and the Navarrese maneuvered Fal and Don Javier into grudging permission to open negotiations; within Falange Hedilla tended to seek alliance with Carlism against the military dictate, while “the legitimists” preferred to align closer with the military in order to gain hegemony over other political groupings. Eventually the Falangists proposed that Comunión gets incorporated, though they conceded to a future Traditionalist monarchy, some separate Carlist features until 6 months after the war and the party youth named “requeté”. Carlists suggested a merger of equals into an entirely new party based on Traditionalist principles, headed by a triumvirate or with Don Javier as a regent; the formation would be dissolved following installation of Traditionalist monarchy. No agreement was in sight, yet representatives of both groupings agreed they would resist interference of any third party; scholars suggest this stipulation was aimed against other right-wing parties rather than against Franco.

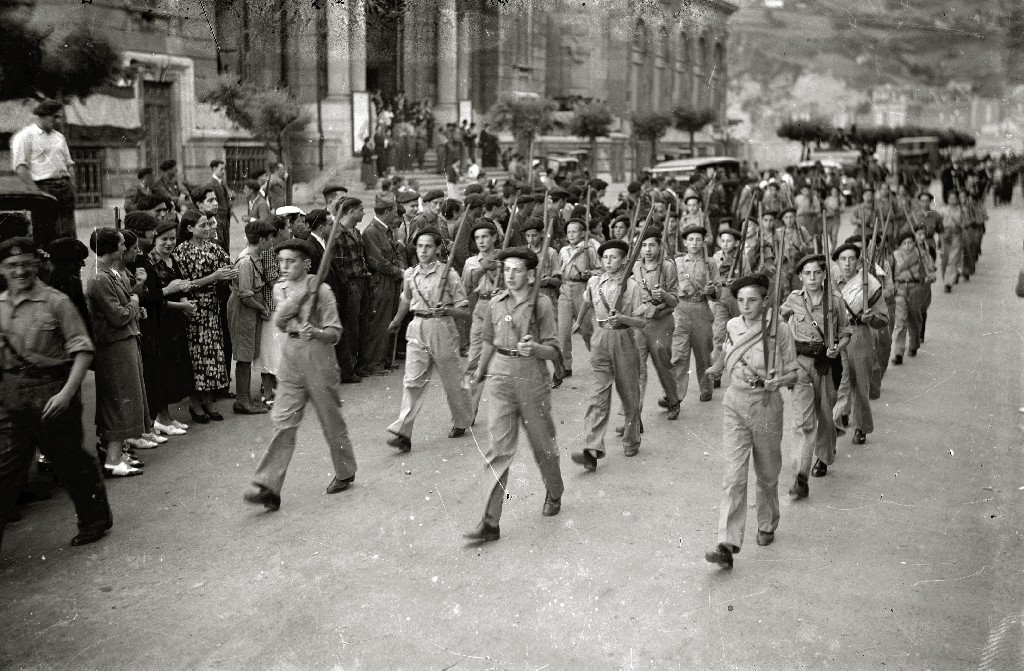
members of Carlist youth branch, Pelayos

In late February one more round of talks was held by Hedillistas and a different representation of Carlists, headed by Rodezno. The Falangist softened their position; Carlism would still be incorporated but a new party would be greatly transformed afterwards, it would accept Traditionalist doctrine and some Carlist symbols, and it would be headed by a triumvirate, possibly including Don Javier. The negotiations did not produce any agreement, most likely because Rodezno did not have the mandate from Fal and Don Javier. The meetings were also flavored with a Juanista spirit, especially that the Falangists were represented among others by Pemán. Though the Alfonsists were not admitted they realized what was going on; their most active politicians, José María Areilza and Pedro Sainz-Rodriguez, kept advocating unification in talks with both FE and CT men, apparently calculating that within a multi-party merger they would be better off than marginalized outside the new organization. At that time also Gil-Robles concluded that all parties must disappear in “amplísimo movimiento nacional” and seemed prepared to accept unification, though from above rather than from below; CEDA as a party of pathetic failures half-sold to parliamentarism was the object of massive propaganda onslaught on part of both Falange and Comunión.

== Last minute maneuvers ==
Falangist standard

Franco first mentioned unification in October, but during 5 months he apparently struggled to work out its terms; in February he was stuck with laborious comparison of José Antonio's and Víctor Pradera's works, in handwritten notes on the margins trying to identify points of convergence. The process gained momentum in late winter of 1937; most scholars relate it to arrival of Ramón Serrano Suñer, the astute man impressed with Italian Fascism who immediate replaced conventional Nicolas Franco as Caudillo's key adviser. Generalísimo was also increasingly concerned with both Falange and Carlism assuming a bolder tone; in March Don Javier and Hedilla addressed him with letters which blended declarations of loyalty with demands, while Falangist congresses drafted grand schemes which demonstrated designs for political hegemony. As a result, in the early spring of 1937 situation was getting increasingly complex. Franco and Serrano were working on unification terms, to be imposed upon Falange and Comunión; both parties tried to agree their own terms as measure of defense against anticipated military dictate; both Falangist and Carlist executives were internally divided with one faction conspiring against another, in Falange the conflict unfolding along mostly personal lines and in Carlism related to the unification strategy.

In mid-March the Carlists already sensed urgency, apparently aware that unification was no longer a distant perspective but an immediate future. In late March the Rodezno-led group of leaders which tended to accept a merger outmaneuvered Don Javier and Fal and in circumstances which bordered internal coup within Carlism forced them to accept the strategy, or at least not to oppose it openly. Franco was delighted to hear the news, but the merger-minded Carlists still hoped for a deal agreed with Falange, not imposed by the military. In early April their Junta adopted a plan which envisioned common party led by a directorio, to be composed of 3 Carlists, 3 Falangists and 6 nominees of Franco, himself the directorio president; they still hoped the organization would lead to the buildup of a Catholic, regionalist, social and ultimately Traditionalist monarchy. Another round of talks with Falangists took place on April 11 and it is only at that point that Hedilla realized the urgency; the parties agreed they would keep talking and confirmed no interference of a 3rd party would be accepted. On April 12 Franco met a few Rodeznistas and informed them that decreed unification was the matter of days, its details – not revealed to the Carlists – yet to be finalized. Their mild reservations were brushed away and they were assured there was nothing to be anxious about. Not entirely convinced, they met few days later to edit a preamble, to be proposed to Franco; the intention was to counter revolutionary Falangism.

Carlist standard

On April 12 Hedilla told his men that accord with the Carlists was almost ready and called the Falangist Consejo Nacional for April 26. However, on April 16 his opponents in the executive visited Hedilla in his Salamanca office and declared him deposed; both Hedillistas and “legitimists” remained in touch with Franco and both were led to believe they had his support. The following day Hedilla stroke back and tried to arrest his opponents; the gunfight left two people dead. At this point Franco's security detained most of these involved except Hedilla, who on April 18 was confirmed by the rump Falangist Consejo as the new Jefe Nacional. Hedilla rushed to Franco's headquarters and was greeted cordially; the two appeared on balcony, where Franco improvised a brief speech; it might have contained first public declaration of unification. At 10:30 PM the same day, April 18, Franco announced the unification in a radio broadcast; The long speech was formatted as historiosophic lecture on Spanish past with special attention paid to national unity as maintained throughout centuries. Referring to “nuestro movimiento” the speech at one point hailed great contribution of Falange, Traditionalism and “otras fuerzas” to note that “we have decided to finalize this unifying work”, to revert to grandiloquent paragraphs later on. Most newspapers issued in the Nationalist zone printed the entire address on April 19.

== Decree and related documents ==
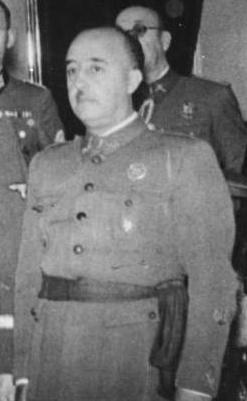
Franco, 1940

The actual unification decree was first disseminated by Radio Nacional in repeated broadcasts aired during April 19, though exact hour of the first broadcast is not clear. On April 20 the document appeared as Decreto número 255 in Boletín Oficial del Estado and was dated April 19; the same day and during the next few days it was reproduced in all newspapers issued in the Nationalist zone. On explicit order of the Franco headquarters the decree was read in frontline units on April 21. Another decree, numbered 260 and dated April 22, was published on April 23; it contained names of individuals appointed to the first executive of the new party, Junta Política or Secretariado. One more decree followed shortly; it defined salute, insignia, anthem, banner, slogan and address code; it also allowed party militias incorporated into the army to use their own symbols until the end of the war.

The unification decree announced in its first point that "Falange Española" and "Requetés" are integrated into one "political entity" led by Franco and named "Falange Española Tradicionalista y de las JONS". Another paragraph declared that all members of "Falange Española" and "Comunión Tradicionalista" are affiliated in the new organization, with other willing Spaniards also entitled to join. The decree dissolved “all other political organizations and parties”, though it did not specify explicitly whether FE and CT were dissolved as well. The second point defined Jefe del Estado, Junta Política (Secretariado) and Consejo Nacional as executive bodies. Junta was supposed to aid Jefe in all matters; half of its members were to be appointed by Jefe del Estado and half by Consejo Nacional. The decree did not specify how members of Consejo were to be nominated. All bodies were supposed to work towards final structure of “totalitarian state”. The third point declared all party militias merged into Milicia Nacional. The preamble stated that the program of the new party would be based on 26 points of the original Falange, though it might be subject to changes and improvements. The new party was defined as “link between the state and the society”.

The decree which nominated members of Junta Política listed 10 names. Among 5 Falangists there were 3 “old-shirts”; Manuel Hedilla (35 years), a businessman Joaquín Miranda González (43) and an officer with loyalties divided between the army and the party, Ladislao López Bassa (32); they were accompanied by one fresh Falangist who had joined after the July coup, a career military officer Darío Gazapo Valdés (46), and one oddball vaguely related to the party with – or at least it might have seemed so – literary rather than political ambitions, Ernesto Giménez Caballero (38). There were 4 Carlists, all of them Rodeznistas: Tomás Domínguez Arévalo (conde Rodezno, 55), his lieutenant Luis Arellano Dihinx (31), rather detached member of Carlist executive Tómas Dolz de Espejo (conde de la Florida, 58) and a locally known Rioja politician José Mazón Sainz (36). The ten was complete with Pedro González-Bueno, an Alfonsist closer to Serrano rather than to the party mainstream (41). Out of 22 individuals who formed pre-unification executive bodies of FE and CT only Hedilla and Rodezno were listed; except Rodezno and Arellano none had earlier parliamentary experience. The decree which followed shortly adopted original Falangist motives – yoke and arrows, Cara al sol, black-red banner, “camarada”-style addressing – as motives of the new party; its uniform was to be a combination of a Falangist blue shirt and a Carlist red beret.

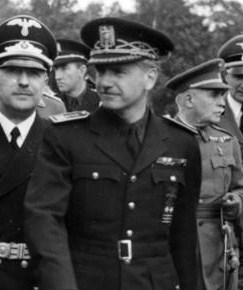
Ramón Serrano Súñer

It is not entirely clear who was responsible for ultimate shape of the unification documents, but most scholars tend to attribute at least most of the authorship to Serrano Suñer; apparently the Generals Mola and Queipo de Llano were consulted earlier on the drafts or the draft. It is not known when the decrees were written; on April 11 Franco told Serrano to finalize the terms and it appears that even on April 18 there were “two or three minor things” to be completed. Neither the Carlists nor the Falangists were admitted to editorial work and they learned the actual terms of the merger once the decrees had been announced publicly. However, they were sounded on some issues; Franco changed the set of his original Carlist appointees to the Junta in line with Rodezno's advice and he discussed with Hedilla the name of the party, with “Falange Española de Tradición” a viable option as late as mid-April.

== Immediate aftermath ==
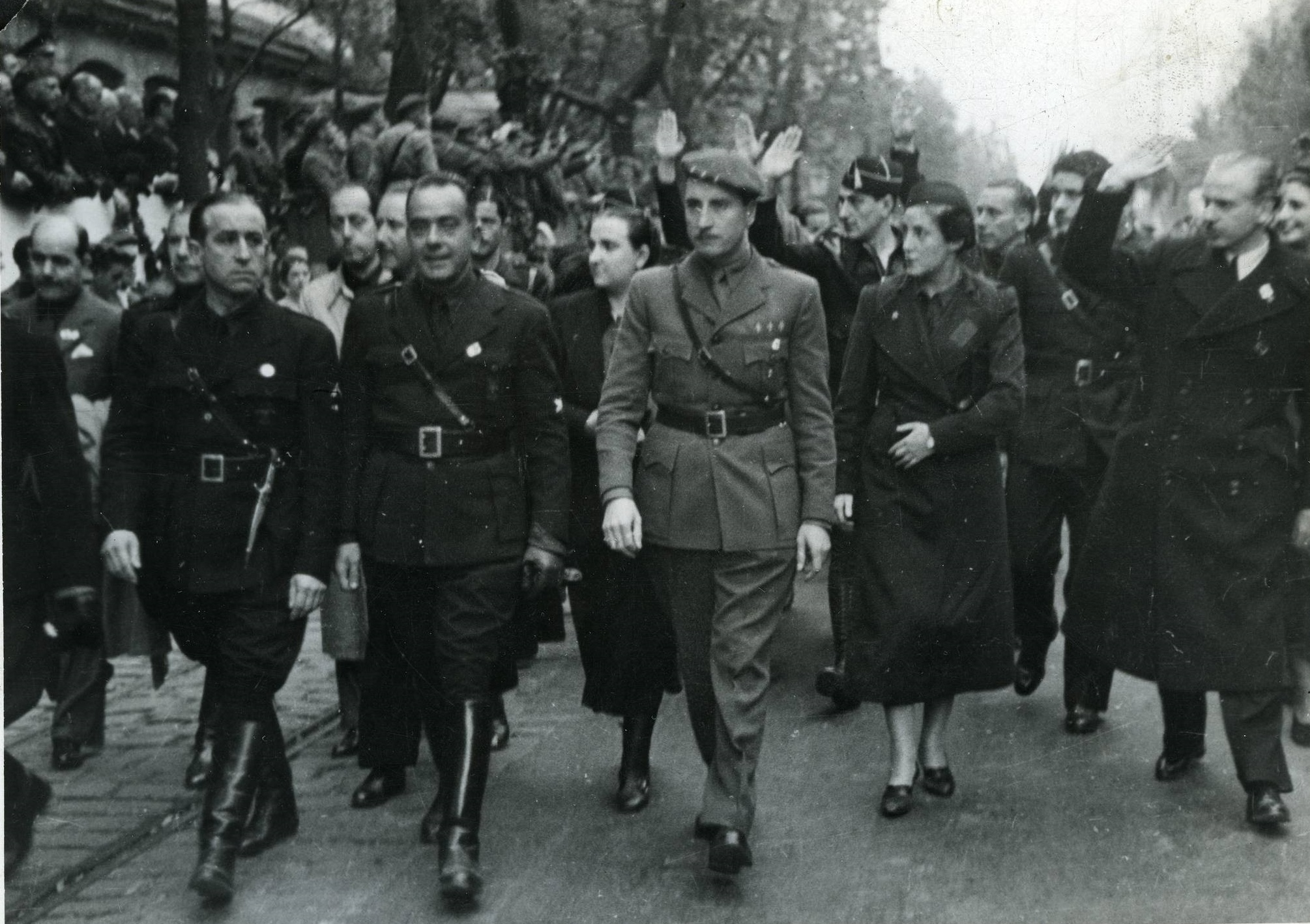
Carlist and Falangist leaders on common parade

Terms of the unification came as an unpleasant if not nasty surprise to most Falangist and Carlist politicians, especially in that they differed from earlier sketchy plans presented by Franco to Hedilla and Rodezno. The Falangists might have been satisfied with their apparent predominance in terms of program and symbols, yet except Hedilla none of their heavyweights was appointed to Junta Política. The “legitimists” – Sancho Dávila y Fernández de Celis, Agustín Aznar, Moreno – were in prison following the Salamanca events of April 16–17; Hedilla himself, misled by Franco that he would be appointed the leader, was shocked to find himself just one of 10 Junta members and on April 23 he refused to take his seat. He was almost immediately arrested, trialed, sentenced to death on inflated charges of treason, commuted and placed in prison. To Rodezno the terms came as a bucket of cold water. In few days he and his men visited Franco to voice their unease, yet they remained tractable and did not mount explicit protest or opposition. Some key Carlist politicians resigned, including the requeté head Zamanillo; the Carlist tycoons who were skeptical about the merger from the onset welcomed the decree with deafening silence.

Among local leaders and the rank-and-file the prevailing mood was this of disorientation. Many tended to view the news as introduction of some vague bureaucratic structure above the existing Falangist and Carlist organizations. Most did not realize the arbitrary nature of unification and believed that it was fully agreed and endorsed by their respective leaders, especially that the official propaganda and censorship clearly advanced such a narrative. In Falangist ranks – which consisted in overwhelming majority of new recruits unrelated to pre-war revolutionary syndicalism – the unification was viewed simply as absorption of Carlism and adoption of new leadership, though a number of Falangist public demonstrations against the unification took place in several cities. In Carlist ranks the mood differed from sheer enthusiasm to protest; some requeté units considered abandoning their frontline positions. Many settled for what they perceived a truce comparable to that offered by Carlos VII to the Madrid government in course of the Spanish–American War. Most other politicians complied; Gil-Robles ordered dissolution of Acción Popular while Yanguas and Goicoechea declared their total support; it was only the JAP commander Luciano de la Calzada who protested and was condemned to internal exile. Many party papers demonstrated perhaps genuine enthusiasm, while various juntas, alcaldias and other groups flooded the Franco Salamanca headquarters with messages of adhesion.

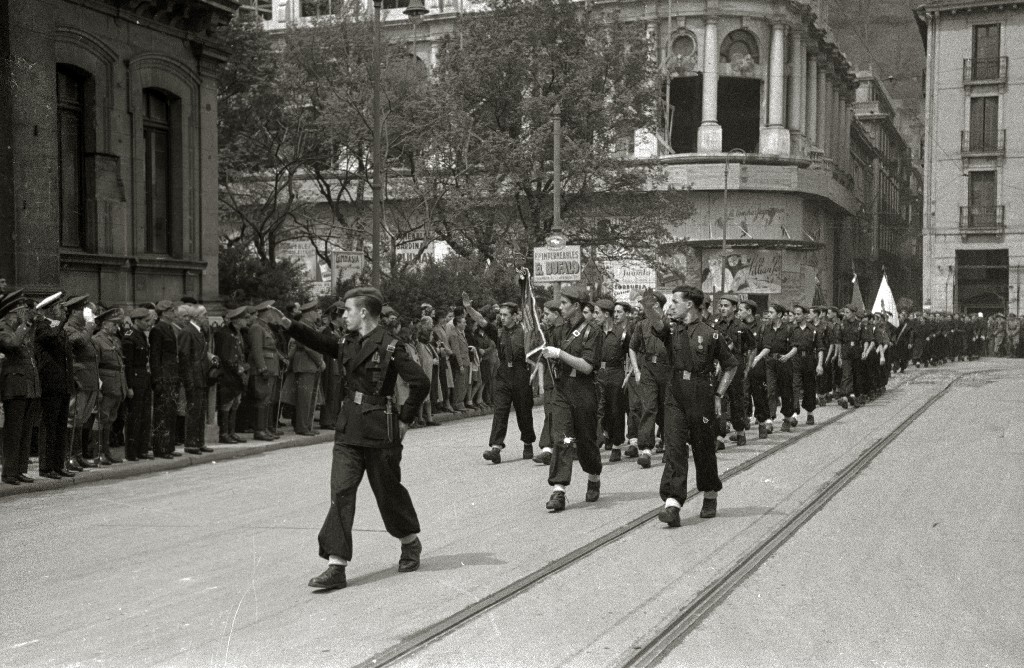
Carlist and Falangist rank-and-file on common parade

First steps to consolidate the new party were taken in late April and May 1937, though their mechanism is not entirely clear; it remains obscure whether they were engineered by administration or by the Junta. Franco initially attended its weekly meetings but soon ceased doing so; it was Serrano who served as a link between him and the party executive. The post of temporary secretary went to López Bassa; other most active figures in the Junta turned out to be Fernando González Vélez (a Falangist old-shirt appointed in place of Hedilla) and Giménez Caballero. Top provincial party posts were filled with a Carlist and a Falangist alternating as delegado and secretario; 22 provincial jefaturas went to the Falangists and 9 to the Carlists. The Carlist and pre-unification Falange press departments were told to stop party propaganda. By May 9. provincial jefes were demanded to submit inventory of pre-unification party assets and in mid-May the new party started to take over their bank accounts. Also in mid-May specialized sections of the new party started to emerge with personal appointments made, again with visible Falangist predominance, be it Sección Femenina or Milicia Nacional. Civil governors organized rallies supposed to demonstrate fraternization of the unified parties. Official propaganda kept exalting the unification as glorious end to a centuries-old historical process. The first task, given to the new party, was rather modest: organize nursing courses.

== First months of unification ==
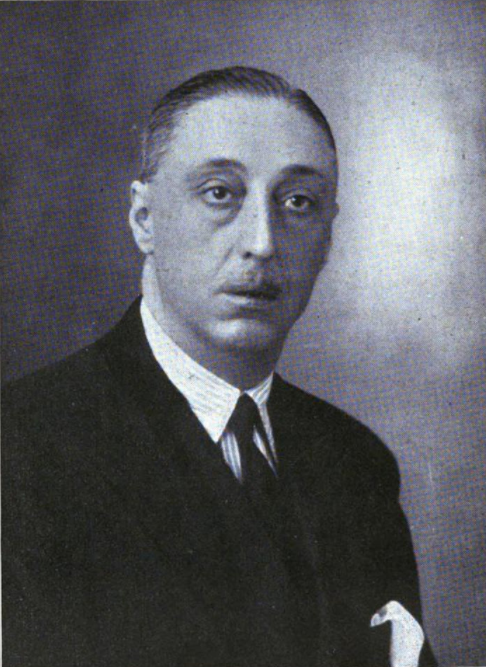
Conde Rodezno

The leaders of Carlism and the original Falange assumed a highly skeptical wait-and-see stand. Franco made some effort to lure both. He sent very respectful letters to Don Javier and suggested that the exiled Fal be made ambassador in Vatican, yet in general terms he left the regent no option but to accept unification. Eventually Franco consented to Don Javier's request and allowed Fal back in Spain, met him in August and vaguely offered him high posts, which Fal politely declined. Both Don Javier and Fal considered Rodezno a half-traitor, though they preferred not to burn the bridges; in the second half of 1937 they focused on saving what could have been saved – related institutions, newspapers, buildings – from takeover by FET. In case of the original Falange its leaders from the anti-Hedillista “legitimist” faction, some released from jail, preferred to remain on the sidelines and not to engage; this was the case of Agustín Aznar, Sancho Dávila, Dionisio Ridruejo, Fernando González Vélez, Rafael Garcerán or Francisco Moreno, who viewed unification as “killing two authentic beings to create an artificial one”. During the summer and fall of 1937 Serrano kept negotiating with them and eventually secured their cautious engagement, the access by some dubbed as suicide of the original Falange; others note that at this point the original Falange signed a pact with Franco, and its notary was Serrano. It was strengthened once the original Secretary General, Raimundo Fernández Cuesta, made it from the Republican zone and in October was reinstated at the same post in FET. Unlike in case of Carlism no effort was made to maintain original, independent structures; a so-called Falange Española Auténtica, active in the late 1937-1939, were loose tiny groups of third-rate dissidents.

Within FET the second half of 1937 was the period of fierce competition for posts and assets between the Falangists and the Carlists. Some 500 conflicts were officially recorded in the party archives; until 1942 this figure grew to 1,450. The Falangists were clearly gaining the upper hand. The party statutes, released in August, defined multiple specialized sections of the organisation; out of 14 delegaciones created only 3 were headed by the Carlists. At one point Giménez suggested a formal purge, a proposal rejected by Franco. Most gatherings demonstrated lingering divisions; a massive rally of youth, staged in October in Burgos and intended as display of unity, turned into embarrassment when in front of Franco a multi-thousand crowd broke into a “blue” Falangist part and a “red” Carlist part. The unificated Carlist leaders were getting increasingly disappointed about their marginalization while the original Navarrese executive – still operational – addressed Franco with a message of complaint and asked for some sort of rectification. In the second half of 1937 many Carlist local leaders who initially engaged in the emerging FET structures were now bombarding their men in Junta Política with letters of outrage, complaining about lack of Falangist give and take and demanding immediate intervention. Violent street clashes between Falangists and Carlists (both unificated and non-unificated) were not rare, with hundreds of arrests following.

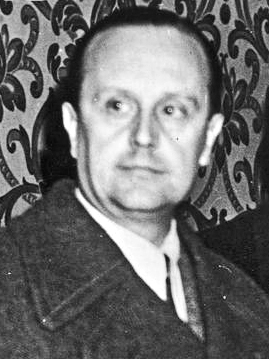
Fernández-Cuesta

In October 1937 Franco decided to set up Consejo Nacional, the body vaguely specified in the Unification Decree as part of the FET executive; he opted for simple nominations. The list of 50 nominees as announced in the media was organized according to an order probably intended to rank them in terms of prestige and importance, with Pilár Primo de Rivera (Falange), Rodezno (Carlism), Queipo de Llano (military) and José Mariá Pemán (Alfonsism) heading the list. There were 24 Falangists appointed, this time including many “legitimists”; among 12 Carlists there were mostly Rodeznistas but also Fal Conde and few of his followers; the list contained 8 Alfonsists, some of them eminent, 5 high-ranking military men and 1 former CEDA politician, Serrano Suñer. Among the appointees 12 had earlier Cortes experience. The appointments marked the end of the constituent phase of Falange Española Tradicionalista. Though the balance of power within the new state party was yet to be established and though its actual political line initially remained vague, some key features were already set and would not be subject to change; firm personal leadership of Franco, predominance of original Falange and its syndicalism, decorative role of formal collective executive bodies like Junta Política or Consejo Nacional and general dependence on state administrative bureaucratic structures.

== Immediate and long-term impact ==
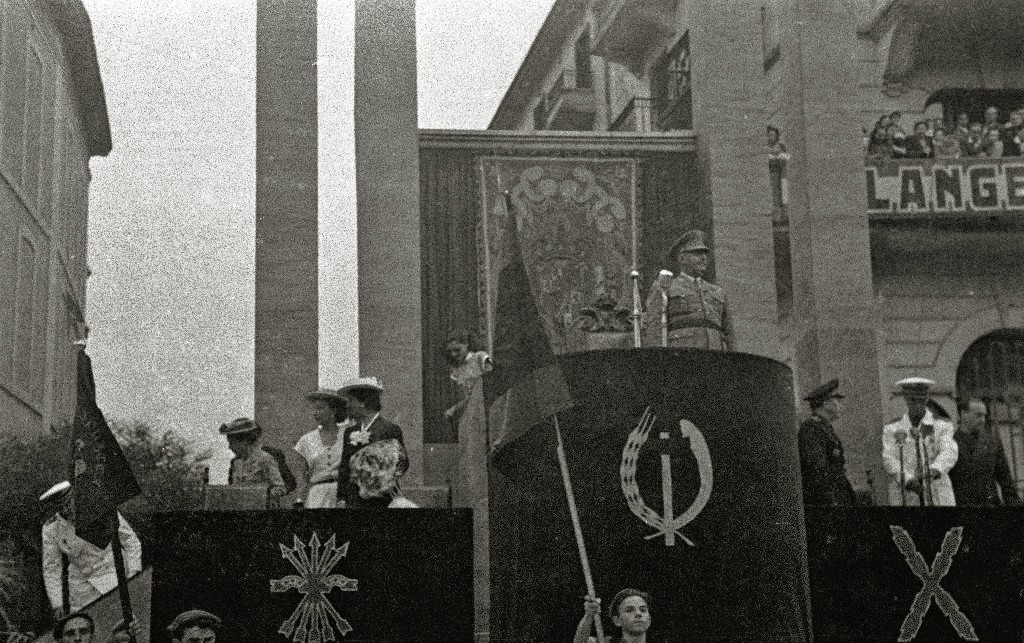
Franco speaking, late 1940s; note Falangist and Carlist symbols

The key outcome of unification was ensuring political unity within the Nationalist camp. The most dynamic political groupings in the rebel zone, so far fully loyal but autonomous and demonstrating own ambitions, were marginalized. Falange was domesticated and though the independent national-syndicalist current within FET remained strong, the party was now firmly controlled by caudillo and his men. Carlism retained its independent political identity beyond FET yet it suffered from fragmentation bordering breakup and Comunión Tradicionalista started to languish in semi-clandestine life. Neither the Falangists nor the Carlists decided to oppose the unification openly and the most intransigent groupings opted merely for non-participation. Key Falangist and Carlist assets – volunteer militia units, formally incorporated into the army but still maintaining their political identity and in mid-1937 amounting to 95,000 men - remained loyal to the military leadership. As a result of unification, no major political discrepancies were allowed to surface in the Nationalist zone, a stark contrast with raging competition and conflicts which plagued the Republican coalition; scholars underline that at least formal political unity greatly contributed to final Nationalist victory in 1939.

Another result of the unification was transformation of political regime in the Nationalist zone; before it might have been perceived as a strong military leadership, afterwards it started to assume features of a political dictatorship. Until April 1937 right-wing political parties remained legal and though martial law imposed grave restrictions on their activity it was to some extent tolerated; afterwards all political entities except FET were outlawed, while FET itself was formatted as organization fully controlled by Franco and his bureaucracy. Licensing of political activity was no longer the result of temporary hardships related to war and military administration but became an intrinsic and fundamental feature of the system. The change enhanced position of Francisco Franco further on and started to shape the system as his personal political dictatorship. Until April he was the supreme army commander and the head of state, the roles which defined his position in military and administrative, but not in strictly political terms. The Unification Decree, which outlined political monopoly of FET and named Jefe del Estado as its leader, formally set up also political personal supremacy of Franco and made him the champion of all political life in the Nationalist zone.

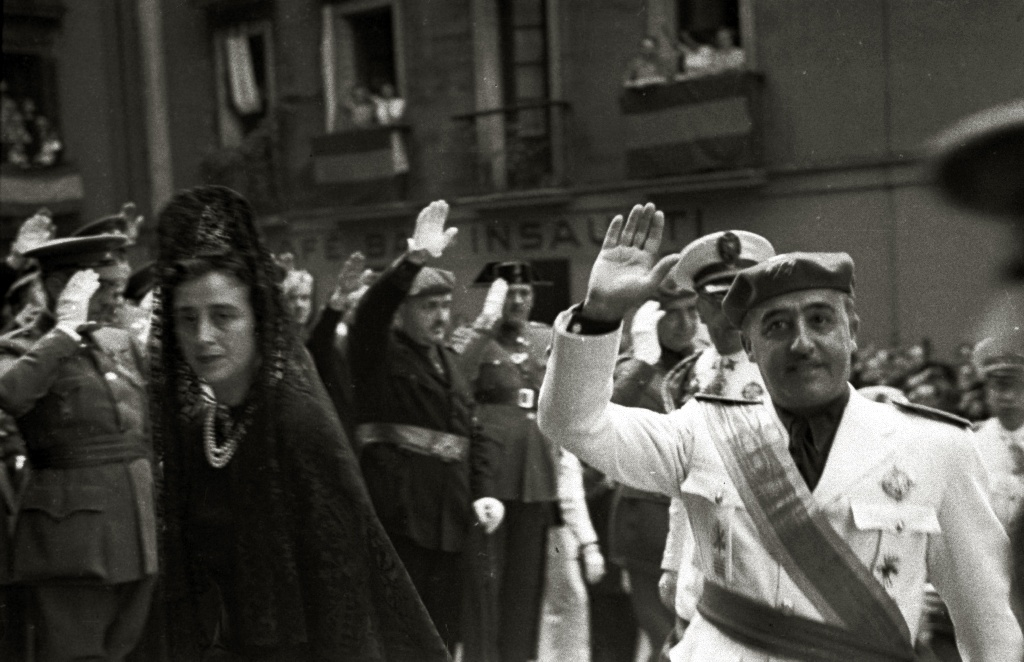
Franco in the summer FET uniform

In few years it turned out that instead of a platform unifying all major political forces the FET became a Falange-dominated structure controlled by state bureaucracy. Independently minded leaders of the original Falange like Aznar or González Veléz were disciplined and at times jailed in case they went off limits and the others like Fernández Cuesta realized that Falangist hegemony in the state party was possible only given Franco was acknowledged as the unquestionable leader and source of all power. Comunión opted for semi-clandestine autonomous identity; Fal did not accept his seat in Consejo and Don Javier expelled from the party all these who had accepted without his earlier consent. Instead of unification, the merger turned into Franco-domesticated Falange absorbing Carlist offshoots, who either (like Iturmendi) renounced their former identity or (like Bilbao) retained it as vague general outlook or (like Rodezno) withdrew after some time anyway. The Alfonsists engaged half-heartedly, then got divided and eventually mostly of them left in the late 1930s and the early 1940s; former CEDA politicians were not welcome. In terms of program the initial propaganda focused on unity or got trapped in contradictions, like “revolutionary program which stems from Spanish tradition”; the Italians were perplexed about weight of the religious ingredient and considered the program a chaotic amalgam which did not merit the name of “Fascism”. Eventually FET was formatted along syndicalist lines and in the Francoist Spain it turned into merely one of many groupings competing for power; other of these so-called political families included the Alfonsists, the Carlists, the military, the technocrats, the Church and the bureaucracy.

== Historiographic assessment ==
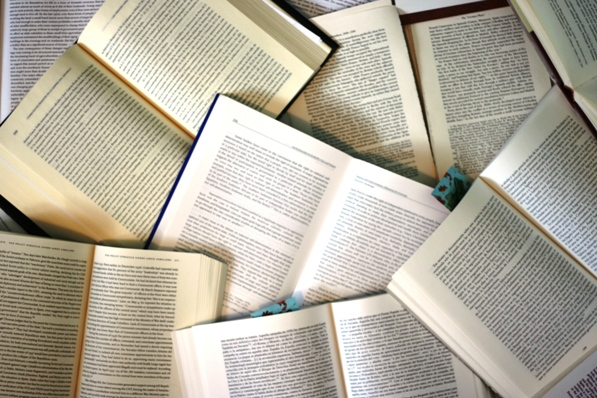

The unification is generally viewed as Franco's success which secured a number of objectives; some scholars consider it even a “masterstroke” or “golpe maestro”. First, it ensured at least formal political unity which greatly contributed to the eventual Nationalist triumph in the Civil War. Second, it marginalized autonomous centers of power which potentially might have posed a challenge to military dictatorship and which indeed in early 1937 started to demonstrate such ambitions. Third, it retained loyalty of volunteer militias recruited by the marginalized parties and did not weaken the Nationalist frontline strength. Fourth, it created a vehicle for control and channeling of popular political mobilization. Fifth, it strengthened the personal position of Franco and, in addition to the roles of military commander and head of administration, made him the champion of domestic Nationalist politics also.

There are some scholars who tend to consider unification a failure. One argument put forward is that it failed to actually unify all Nationalist political groupings; Carlism and Alfonsism survived as autonomous forces and soon new ones started to emerge. Another argument is that the newly created state party, Falange Española Tradicionalista, has never become the vehicle of popular mobilization, a platform of forging a political course and a social backbone of the regime; instead it rather discouraged popular activism, served as mere transmission belt from administration and turned into a bureaucratic machinery which attracted mostly opportunists and careerists. Others responded that first, the role of FET in the Francoist Spain evolved over decades and it was principally determined in the early 1940s, not in the very initial phase, and second, that during the Civil War the party functioned exactly as it was designed to.

There are other questions related to unification which remain open to debate. It is not agreed whether FET was created as a stepping stone towards a Fascistoid/Fascist state or whether it was set up principally to eliminate any competitive centers of power and served rather traditional objectives of securing dictatorial powers of one individual. It is not entirely clear whether unification was a hastily rushed provisional measure triggered by displays of Falangist and Carlist ambitions or rather a carefully prepared step which had matured in Franco's mind for some time. It is open to debate whether FET was initially intended to harbor a generally vague political program so that doctrinal rigidity did not stand in the way of getting “neutral mass” affiliated, or whether it was formatted along national-syndicalist lines. It remains obscure why Falange from the onset enjoyed advantage over the Carlists, and specifically whether it was the setup designed by Franco and Serrano (who appreciated greater Falangist mobilization potential and intended to present a counter-offer to radicalized masses), or whether it was the result of internal dynamics within the party (resulting from Carlist numerical inferiority, consistently skeptical stand of the regent or errors committed by their unificated leaders, who prematurely decided to withdraw).

Many questions remain in relation to the unificated parties themselves. It is not entirely clear why the Carlists and the original Falange succumbed to the unification pressure, with various motives quoted: Franco's strategy of first carving out tractable politicians and then misleading them as to what the unified party would look like, overwhelming military pressure, Falangist and Carlist illusions that they could outsmart Franco or their leaders having been ready to sacrifice what they considered secondary features in order to achieve the common goal of defeating the Republicans. It remains to be debated who was better off: Falange, which achieved hegemony at the cost of losing autonomy, or Carlism, which retained autonomy at the cost of being pushed to the sidelines. Historians debate whether the original Falange “was killed”, “castrated” and “committed suicide” during the unification process - i.e. it ceased to be an autonomous, revolutionary movement - and FET should be considered an entirely new entity, or whether the party was rather transformed and FET should be viewed as some sort of continuity of FE. Similarly, there is no agreement whether unification broke the backbone of Carlism and commenced its long period of agony, or whether it merely severely weakened the movement which later regained some strength, in the 1960s again started to pose challenge to Franco's political designs, and collapsed due to profound social changes of late Francoism.

== Annex. First FET Junta Política ==
| name | # | age | from | party | pre-unification leadership role | profession | in Consejo Nacional until | afterwards | death |
|---|---|---|---|---|---|---|---|---|---|
| Manuel Hedilla Larrey | 1 | 35 | Cantabria | FE (old shirt) | national (1936) | technician | - | did not take seat, imprisoned, withdrew into privacy | 1970 |
| Tomas Domínguez Arévalo (conde Rodezno) | 2 | 55 | Navarre | CT | national (1932–34) | landholder | 1946 | min.of justice 1938-39, Cortes 1943-46, Juanista | 1952 |
| Darío Gazapo Valdés | 3 | 46 | Cuba | FE (new shirt) | local | military (sub-colonel) | 1942 | army colonel | 1942 |
| Tomás Dolz de Espejo (conde de la Florida) | 4 | 58 | Madrid | CT | regional | landholder | 1939 | withdrew into privacy | 1974 |
| Joaquín Miranda González | 5 | 43 | Andalusia | FE (old shirt) | regional | businessman | 1958 | civil governor, after 1945 sidelined | 1961 |
| Luis Arellano Dihinx | 6 | 31 | Navarre | CT | local | businessman | 1939 | active in Navarre, Cortes 1952-67, Juanista | 1969 |
| Ernesto Giménez Caballero | 7 | 38 | Madrid | FE (expelled) | local | publisher | 1946 | in diplomacy and mostly abroad, Cortes 1943-1958 | 1988 |
| José María Mazón Sainz | 8 | 36 | Rioja | CT | provincial | lawyer | 1942 | withdrew into privacy and business engagements | 1981 |
| Pedro González-Bueno y Bocos | 9 | 41 | Madrid | Alfonsism | local | engineer | 1967 | Minister of Work 1938-39, in syndicates, Cortes 1943-71 | 1985 |
| Ladislao López Bassa | 10 | 32 | Baleares | FE (old shirt) | local | military (captain) | 1942 | provisional Secretary General of FET | 1942 |

== See also ==
- Carlism
- Carlo-francoism
- Falange Española de las JONS
- Falange Española Tradicionalista y de las JONS
- Francisco Franco
