= Tomás Dolz de Espejo =

Spanish politician and businessman

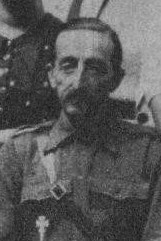
- Born: Tomás Dolz de Espejo; 1879; Bayonne
- Died: 1974 (aged 94–95); Madrid
- Occupation: landowner
- Known for: politician
- Political party: Carlism, FET

Tomás Dolz de Espejo y Andréu y Muñoz Serrano y Duforq-Salinis, 5th Count of La Florida (1879-1974) was a Spanish politician and businessman. For approximately 30 years he campaigned within Traditionalism and Carlism. Periodically he held regional party leadership positions, and is best known as a member of the first Junta Política and Consejo Nacional (executive bodies of the newly created Francoist state party, Falange Española Tradicionalista).

== Family and youth ==
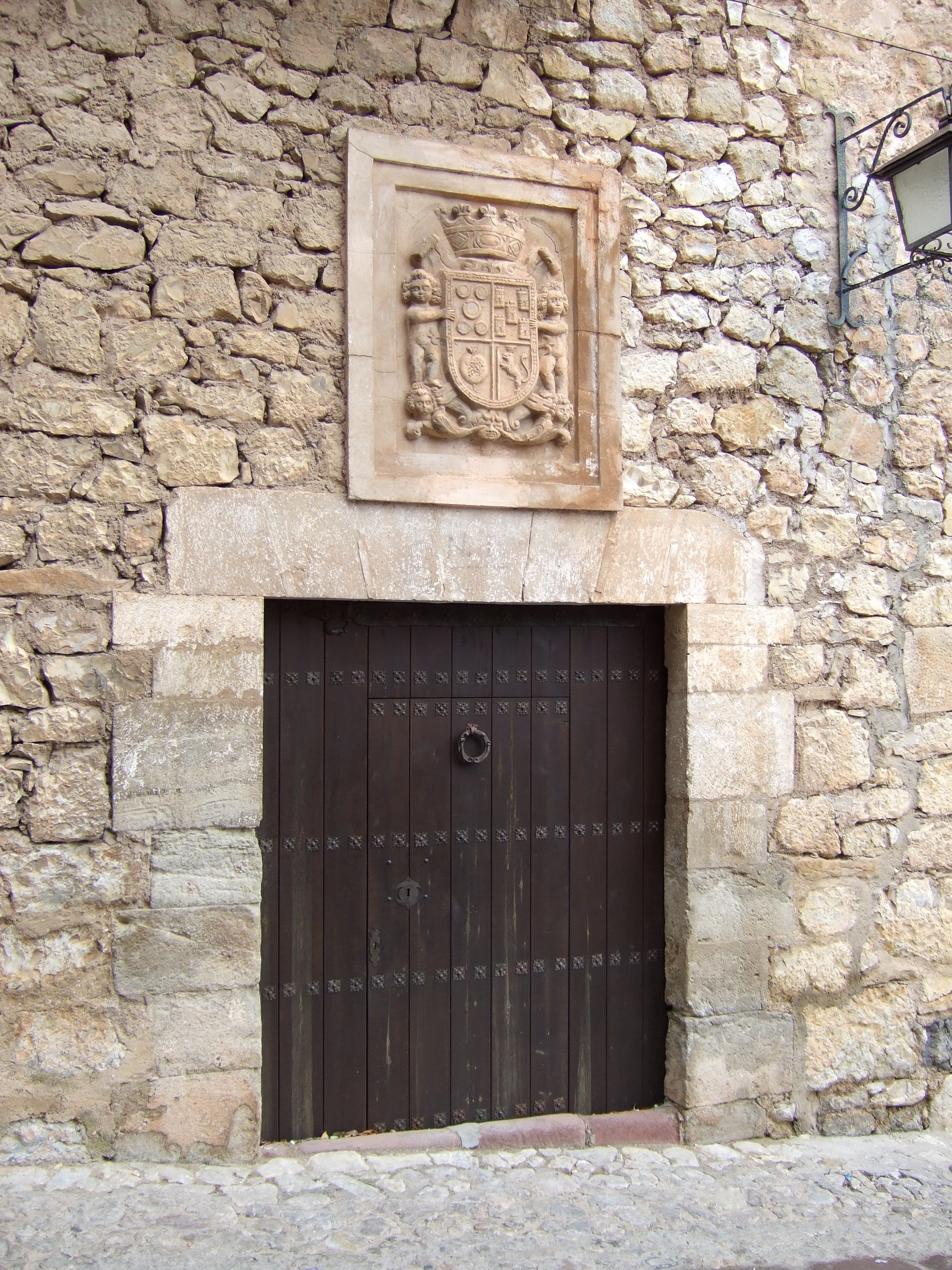
Dolz de Espejo house, Albarracín

The Dolz lineage is related to Southern Aragón; its first representatives were noted in the late 12th century. The family was initially linked to Albarracín, over time spreading to neighboring counties. The Espejos originated from Castelfabib in Kingdom of Valencia. The two families intermarried in the early 17th century, giving rise to the Dolz de Espejo branch. Tomás’ great-grandfather, Pedro Federico Dolz de Espejo, was awarded the title of Conde de la Florida in 1789. His son, the 2nd Count and the grandfather of Tomás, Pedro Pablo Dolz de Espejo, distinguished himself during the Napoleonic era. At the outbreak of the First Carlist War in 1833 he sided with the legitimists; following defeat he went into exile and died in 1842 in Bordeaux. His son and Tomás’ father, Pedro Manuel Dolz de Espejo (1820-1879), as 3rd Count returned to Spain re-assuming family landholdings in Teruel. He joined the Carlist conspiracy too, during Third Carlist War entrusted with economic issues; it was his signature present on banknotes, issued by the Carlists. He too went into exile, settling in Bayonne. He married a girl from another aristocratic Aragón family, María Andréu y Duforq-Salinis (1843-1920).

Between 1876 and 1879 the couple had 3 children; Tomás was born in France as the younger of two sons. It is not clear when the widow and half-orphans returned to Spain; she is first noted back in the family palace in Teruel in 1888. None of the sources consulted provided information on the early years of Tomás, except that he was brought up in "escuela de la lealtad y sacrificio". It is neither clear where he received his education; because he was later referred to as "engineer", he probably studied technology, possibly in Madrid. At an unspecified time in the 1900s he engaged in construction; in 1911 he was noted as manager of a Madrid-based company, La Constructora. In 1912 he was referred to as "propietario"; he took over the family business in 1913, following the premature and childless death of his older brother, the 4th Count; he also inherited the title.

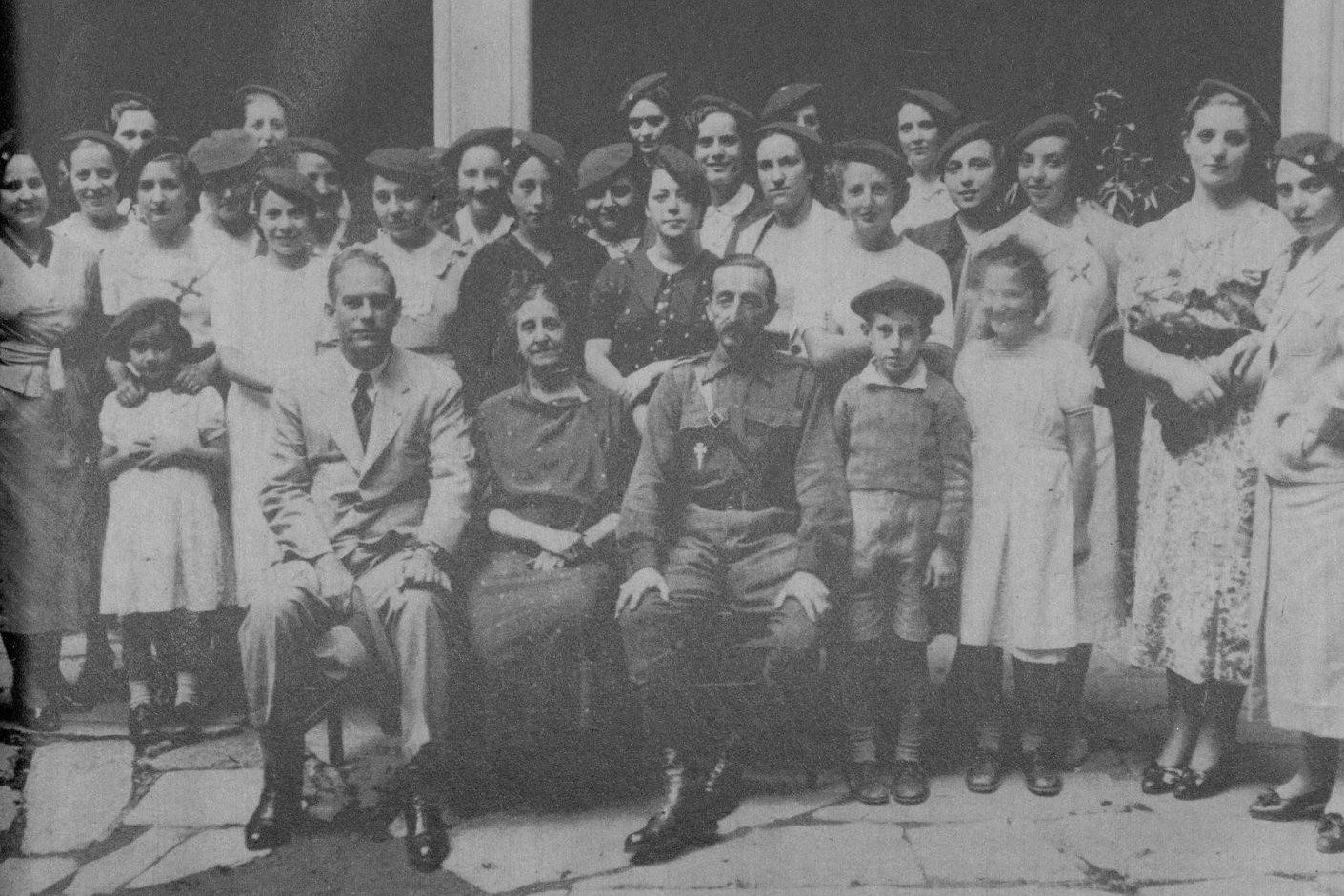
wife

In 1912 Tomás Dolz married María de la Estrella González de la Riva Vidiella (1882-1989), daughter to teniente coronel de artillería 9th Marques de Villa Alcázar. The couple settled in Madrid at Conde Aranda; they had 3 children, born between 1913 and 1914. None of them became a public figure, though the only son, Carlos Dolz de Espejo y González de la Riva (1913-2013), an air force general, briefly gained media attention in relation to the most famous Spanish UFO incident of 1976. A younger daughter, María, married Antonio Galbis Loriga, Conde de Morphy, general de artillería and ayudante honoríficio to Franco. Among numerous grandchildren of Tomás and María, the best known ones are Carlos Dolz de Espejo y Arrospide, businessman and the 7th Conde de la Florida; Alfonso Galbis Dolz de Espejo is an artist and Tomás Galbis Dolz de Espejo was an artillery colonel.

== Early political career (until 1919) ==
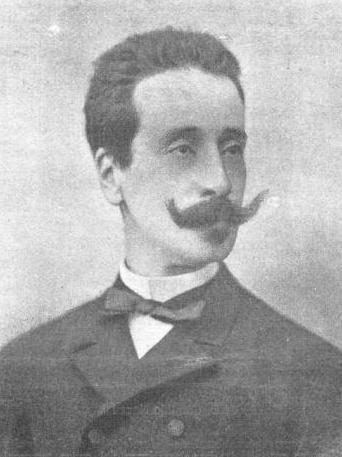
Ramón Nocedal

With two generations of ancestors serving the legitimist cause Dolz seemed poised to follow suit, especially that his mother also came from a traditionalist family. However, during his youth Traditionalism was divided into mainstream Carlists and the breakaway Integrists. His brother, only 2 years senior, sided with the rebels; as a 16-year-old in 1893 he publicly voiced support for the Nocedalistas. In the course of the 1890s Pedro Dolz de Espejo grew in the Integrist structures, in 1900 rising to president of the Valencian Junta Provincial and in 1907 entering the executive of Valencian Junta Regional. However, none of the sources consulted confirms (or denies) that Tomás followed his older brother; until the early 1910s, he was not recorded as engaged in politics.

Dolz was first noted in political milieu In 1911, he demonstrated support to Traditionalist deputies from both the Integrist and Jaimist minorities, who in the Cortes in vain tried to block Ley del Candado. In 1912 he was admitted to Real Maestranza de Caballeria de Zaragoza, a theoretically non-political but in fact highly conservative aristocratic organization. Following the death of his older brother he became a somewhat prestigious figure in the Teruel realm and as such decided to join the electoral race: in 1914 he ran to the Cortes from Mora de Rubielos, a district in the Teruel province; it was also the first time he declared himself a Jaimista, member of the Carlist branch supporting the claim of Don Jaime. The attempt proved premature and he lost pathetically, gaining 10 times fewer votes than a victorious candidate. Following the defeat Florida is never confirmed to have renewed his bid for the parliament.

In the mid-1910s Florida, already referred to in the press as "rico propietario", was already fully engaged in the Jaimista structures. In 1915 he was rumored to be running in the Cortes elections of the following year from the Madrid Latina district; the news eventually proved false, though in 1916 he was busy mounting an electoral alliance which would include even the Traditionalist arch-enemies, the Liberals. In 1917 he worked to seal an electoral union of the Jaimists, the Integrists, the Maurists and independent candidates, to be fielded in the forthcoming electoral campaign. He rose to first secretary of the Madrid municipal Jaimist organization, in 1918 growing to its jefe and soon also jefe of the provincial Madrid structures, though in general remained a back-row party figure.

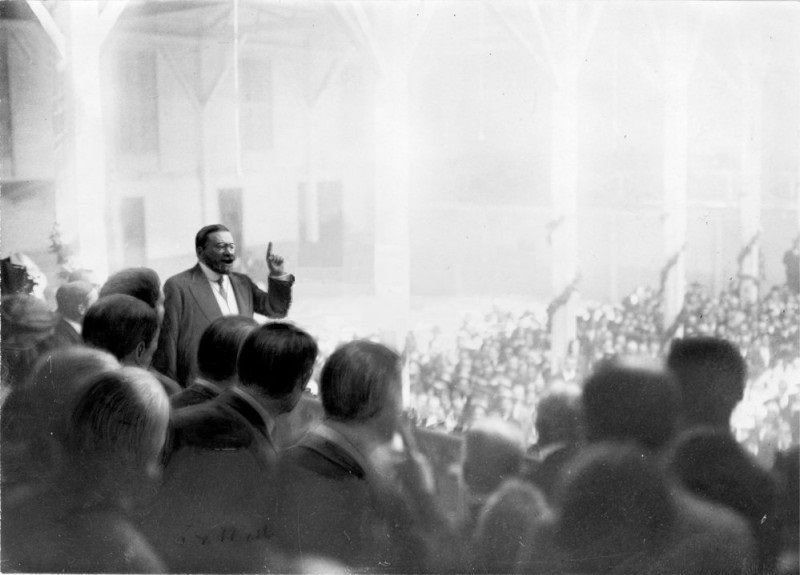
de Mella speaking, 1916

Though he seemed perfectly loyal to Don Jaime, in the new internal conflict within Carlism Florida tended rather to side with its key theorist, Juan Vázquez de Mella. This was demonstrated not only by Mellista's typical penchant for right-wing alliances, but also by advocating neutralist stand in the Great War, a strategy intended to counter pro-Entente feelings and effectively supporting the Central Powers. Florida was not among chief protagonists of the strife and remained in the background; however, when in 1919 Vázquez de Mella broke away and set up his own party, Dolz de Espejo decided to join him.

== Rebellious Mellista and reconciled Carlista (1919-1936) ==
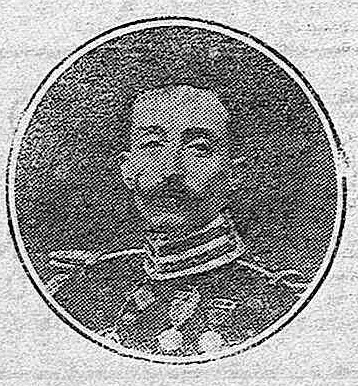
in 1923

In 1920 Florida joined a 3-member Mellista Castilla La Nueva executive; In 1921, he assumed the position of Jefe Provincial in Madrid and honorary president of the Madrid branch of the party youth, Juventud Católica Tradicionalista. Reported as engaged in a variety of initiatives – setting up new cinemas in Madrid, collecting money for religious purposes, donating and organizing donations to army operations in Morocco, taking part in Catholic ceremonies, supporting sports- he was not, however, noted as busy building the party structures. In 1922 he attended a general Mellista assembly, taking place in Zaragoza and supposed to finalize buildup of the new party. The assembly launched Comité Directivo of the newly formed Partido Tradicionalista; Florida was one of its 3 members. He was also confirmed as the Madrid Jefe Provincial, temporarily given command of "provincias del Centro, Sur y Oeste de España". The Mellista project hardly took off the ground when the 1923 coup of Miguel Primo de Rivera banned all political parties in the country.

Florida withdrew to privacy, in public noted for charity and glamour of aristocratic societé. Resident of Madrid, he was spending strings at his La Florida property in Teruel and in estates in Valencia. Fascinated by cars he managed a Sitges circuit, excelled in Real Automovil Club and co-ran a tourist review; owner of a new Buick, he was fined for excessive driving until his car was stolen. Excluding landholding properties, he lived off a number of enterprises; apart from construction company he was president of Sociedad Española de Talcos and Compañia de Seguros Omnia. During Dictablanda Dolz renewed political endeavors. In May 1930 he was received by Alfonso XIII. Against the rising Republican tide he stood on monarchist ground, cultivating old-style patriotism. Having joined Unión Monárquica Nacional, in April 1931 he ran on its ticket in elections for the Madrid ayuntamiento.

Carlist standard

Upon declaration of the Republic Florida tried to transfer his capital abroad. Apprehended by the customs service he was detained and possibly suffered forfeiture of some of the assets smuggled. At unspecified time he returned to Carlist loyalty by entering Comunión Tradicionalista, which in 1932 re-joined the former Jaimistas, Integristas and Mellistas. In 1933 he was appointed its Jefe Regional of Castilla La Nueva. Despite holding a theoretically prestigious position, Florida did not seem particularly active; he was seldom recorded as speaking at party meetings. and historians almost do not mention his name when discussing Carlist activities during the Republic. It is not clear what his position was on the controversial question of alliances with other monarchist and right-wing groupings, or on internal leadership rivalry between Conde de Rodezno and Manuel Fal. In 1935 the latter triggered his nomination to Junta de Hacienda, a body entrusted with organizing funds for the Comunión.

== Towards political climax (1936-1937) ==
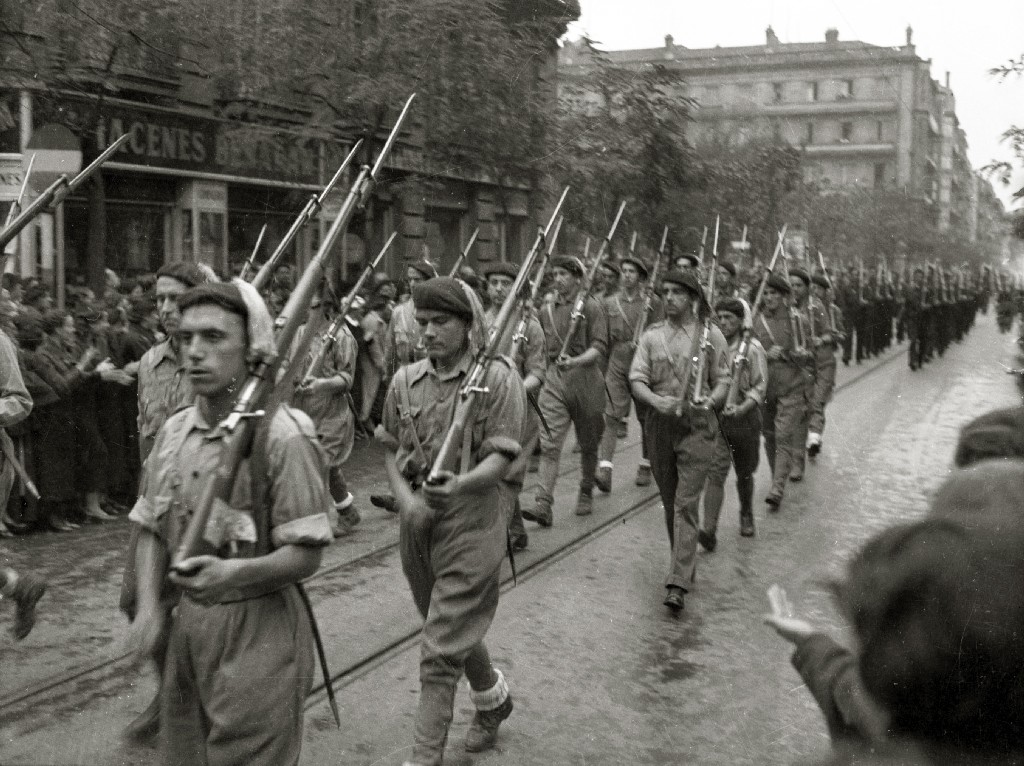
requetés (1936)

It is not clear whether Florida was engaged in Carlist preparations to the July 1936 coup. Some sources claim that in mid-September 1936 he was nominated the Carlist comisario de guerra for the region of León; In September, he emerged in Ciudad Rodrigo, busy organizing Requeté; In October, his León efforts gained him a letter of thanks from the new Carlist regent, Don Javier. Though he is not listed as member of the national Carlist wartime executive, Junta Nacional Carlista de Guerra, residing in Salamanca he started to take part in meetings of the Comunión leaders. For reasons which are not entirely clear his position grew; perhaps as a host Florida presided over a Carlist emergency meeting of December 1936, called to deal with Franco's demand that Fal Conde leaves Spain. It is not clear what position he took; some historians discussing the day refer to him as "Rodezno’s ally", which suggests that Florida proposed that the ultimatum be accepted.

Starting early 1937 the Carlists were facing a prospect of forced amalgamation into a state party; the claimant and the Falcondistas opted for intransigence, Rodezno and the Navarrese opted for negotiations. Florida was present at a February meeting in Insua and sided with the Rodeznistas, position maintained also in March. In early April he took part in a meeting of a somewhat rebellious Navarrese Junta Central; it adopted a Franco-addressed proposal suggesting a directorio, composed of Carlists, Falangists and Caudillo's appointees. In mid-April he was one of 4 Carlists summoned to Burgos; generalísimo informed them about forthcoming political unification. It is not clear why he was picked up by Franco; some suggest that Florida was among most "conspicuous" Carlists because of his Requeté recruitment activities.

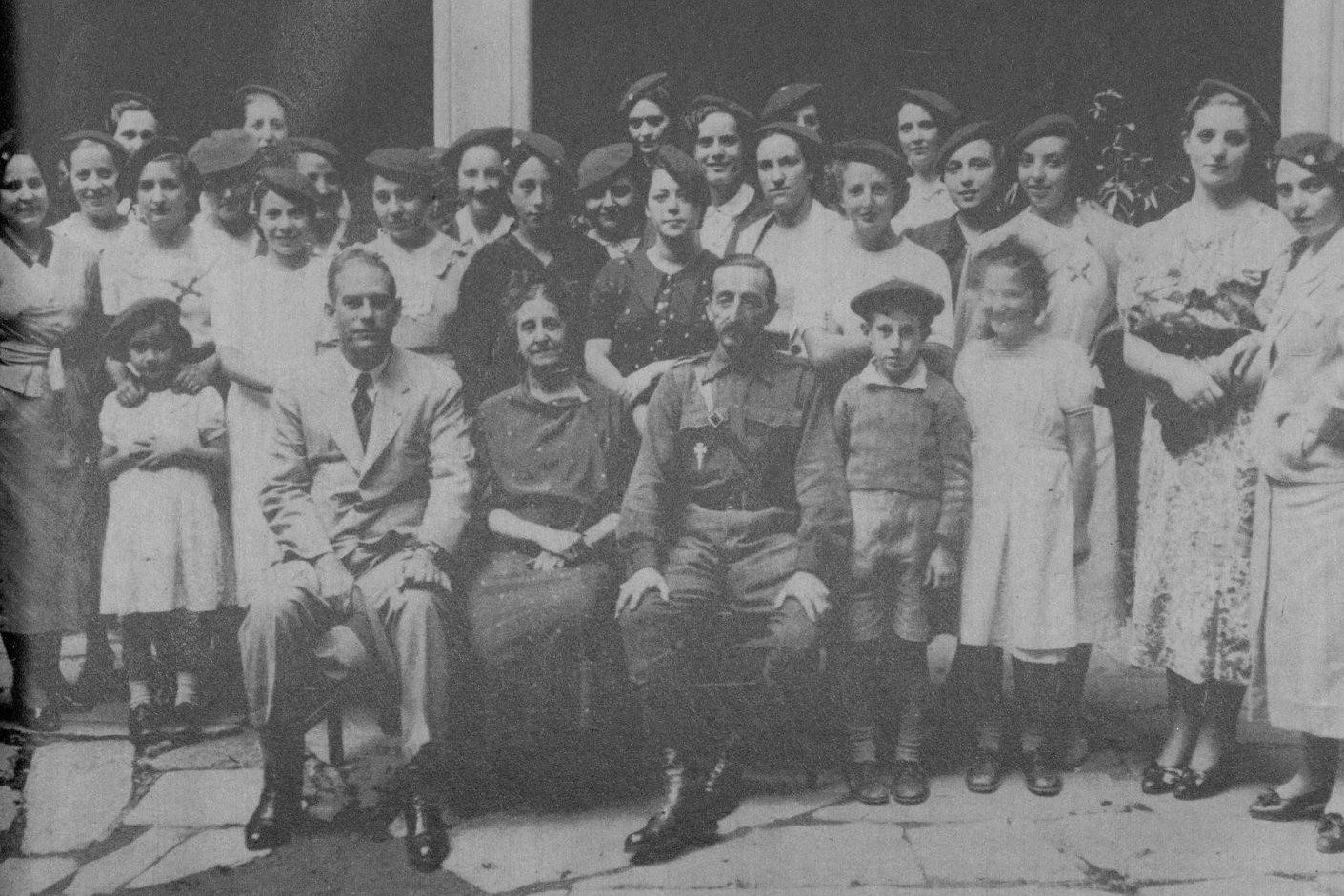
in Salamanca, 1937

At that time Franco and his aides were already considering personal composition of executive of the state party just to be announced. Florida was not among the Carlists initially marked; presented by Franco with shortlisted candidates, Rodezno suggested that Marcelino Ulibarri is dropped and one more seat is reserved for the Carlists, coming with the names of Florida and José María Mazón. The proposal was accepted and on 22 April Dolz found himself among 4 Carlists nominated to a 10-member "Secretariado o Junta Política" of Falange Española Tradicionalista. Of all its members he was perhaps the least-known one; among press-published short notes about the appointees, his was the shortest one. Terms of unification greatly disappointed many Carlists, including some of the Junta appointees; the regent was furious. In June the Carlist junteros asked him to authorize their presence in the Junta, but to no avail; later on all were expulsed from Comunión for breach of loyalty.

== Executive or figurehead (1937-1939) ==
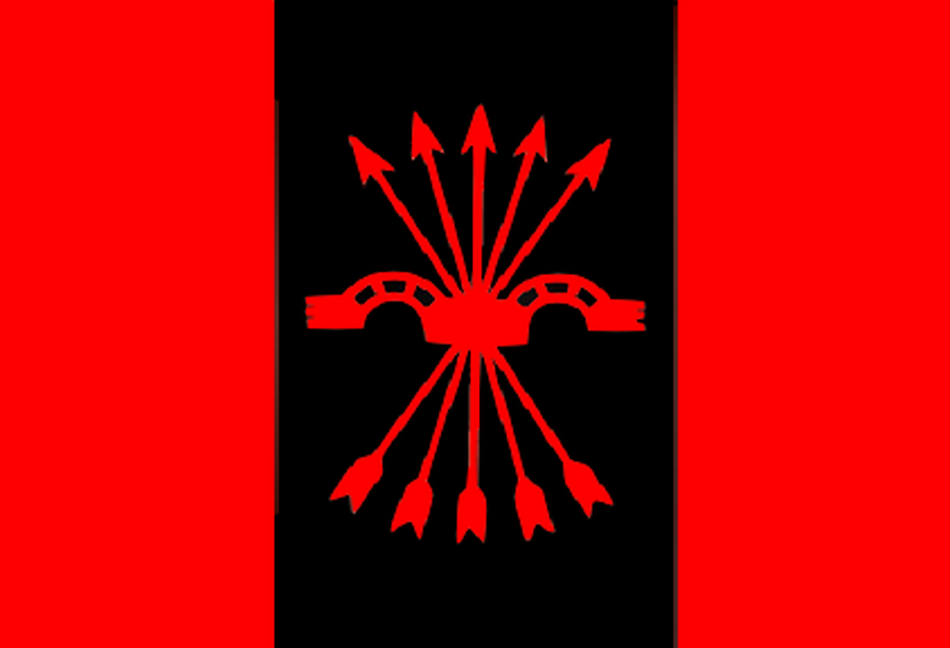
Falangist standard

Frustrated by the lack of the Falangist give and take in the Junta, some Carlists complained to Franco; the result were October 1937 nominations to another party body, a 50-member Consejo Nacional. Florida found himself among 12 Carlist nominees and was already firmly mounted among the highest-positioned civilians of the Francoist Spain, sitting in two bodies directing the only political organization allowed in the state. However, many historians agree that both executive structures were rather decorative and that the entire party was at that stage a nascent structure, called into being to ensure that power stays with Franco and yet to acquire its later dynamics. Moreover, the Carlists were enraged to find that what they were supposed to be an organization they could control or at least influence was increasingly turning into a new version of Falange, with syndicalist blue-shirts systematically gaining the upper hand. Following unification Carlist rank-and-file started to bombard their leaders in Junta and in Consejo with complaints about getting sidetracked, asking for support. As recipient of these notes and phone calls Florida is recorded as pledging support; it is not clear whether he indeed intervened, though it is clear that nothing changed.

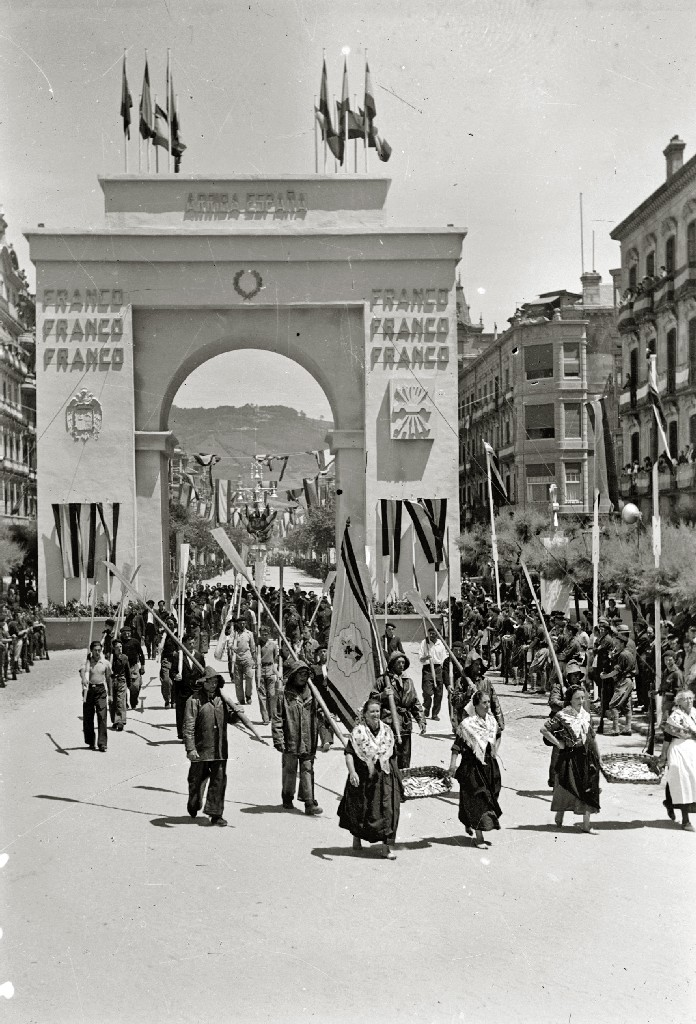
Francoism, 1939

Throughout most of the Civil War in public Florida maintained a loyal Francoist stand. In newspapers he was quoted arguing in favor of the unification; according to him both Carlism and Falange were anti-democratic, anti-Liberal, anti-parliamentarian and Catholic, he claimed also that both supported monarchist solutions to be implemented in the future. Apparently he also tried to cultivate the Traditionalist format as much as he could, with some other FET executives attending sermons honoring Carlist kings Carlos VII and Alfonso Carlos or taking part in an annual Carlist feast dedicated to Mártires de la Tradición, initially observed by the state party. On the other hand, he did not refrain from attending new-style events, like banquets in the Nazi headquarters in Salamanca. In 1938 he acted as FET Jefe Provincial in Salamanca, typically one of the 3 most important civilian positions in every province; it is not clear what exact dates of his term were.

Florida's career at the top of the Francoist political strata came to the end in the late summer of 1939. As late as in August he was still reported taking part in public events as consejero nacional, but this changed in September; he did not find himself among appointees to the II Consejo Nacional and starting 1940 he was reported in the press simply as "Conde de la Florida". None of the sources consulted offers any insight into his departure from the party executive, and specifically whether it was a fall from grace or a conscious decision to withdraw. It could have been resignation following disappointment with the syndicalist format of the new party; it could have been marginalization suffered as a result of an internal conflict, as it happened with Joaquín Bau, another Carlist sidetracked by Ramón Serrano Suñer, especially that Florida publicly kept declaring inevitable restoration of the monarchy.

== Political retirement and long senility (after 1939) ==
RUMHE logotype

No longer in the top political flight, in the early 1940s Florida was still present in public life, e.g. taking part in Traditionalism-flavored feasts attended by some FET heavyweights. In 1942 he was not appointed to the III Consejo Nacional and his political career seemed definitely over. This might not have been exactly the case, as in 1944 he was reported among governmental officials, namely noted as subsecretario de industria. This was, however, definitely the last of his Francoist episodes; afterwards he was no longer mentioned related either to the party or to the government. He did not accept an olive branch from Carlism; in 1942 Fal declared that all those stained by Falangism might be re-admitted given they abandon their state party links; the offer explicitly excluded from the scheme some of the leaders, but Florida was not among them. In the late 1940s he ventured to publicly demonstrate support for Ricardo Oreja, his old-time fellow Mellista, when the latter succeeded in Madrid municipal elections.

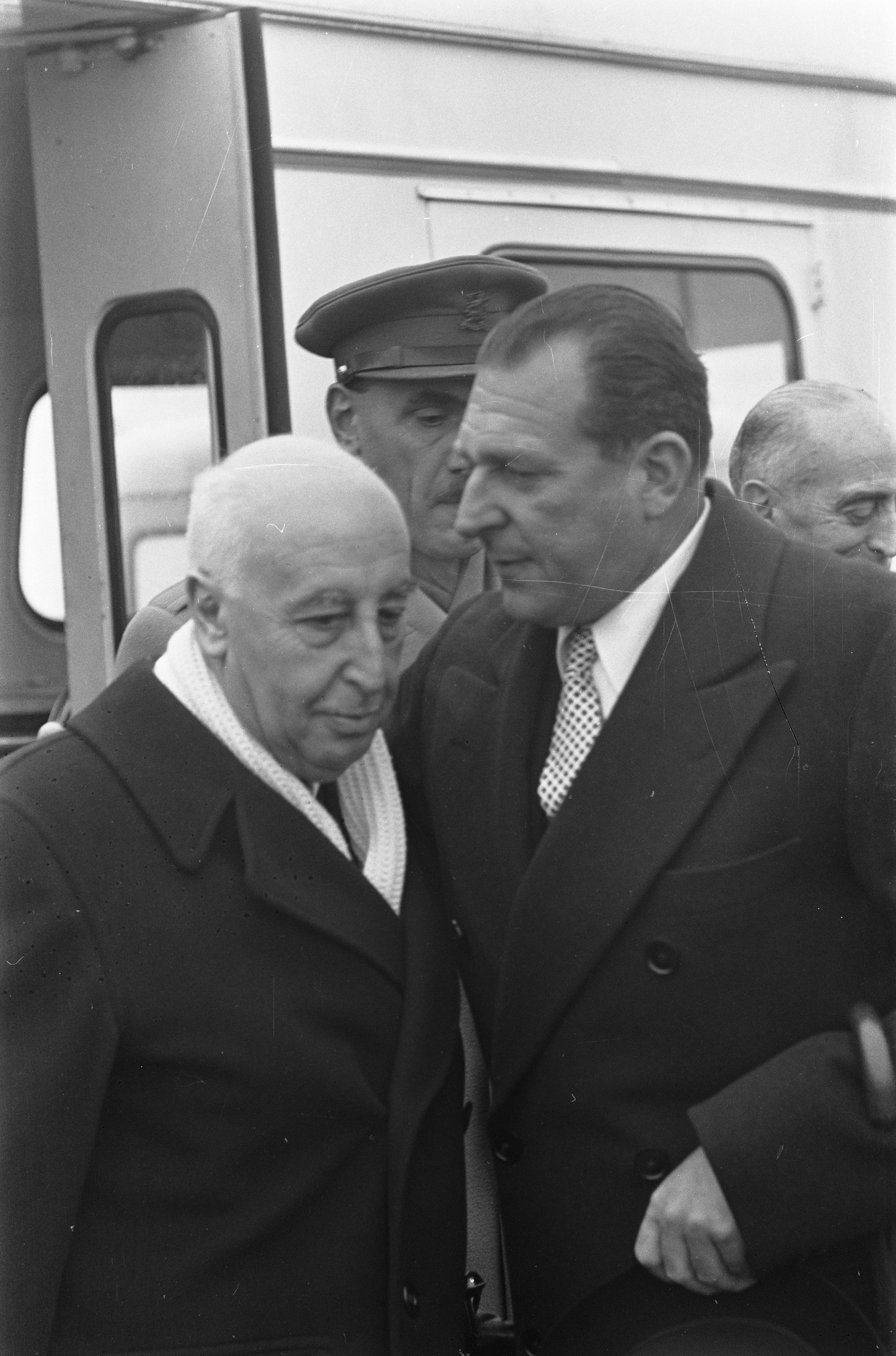
Alfonsist claimant Juan de Borbón y Battenberg (right), 1959

Though already at the retirement age, Florida remained active in a number of enterprises, mostly related to mineral resources and dependent businesses, like construction or pharmaceuticals; some of them, like RUMHE, landed hefty contracts in prestigious locations, like the Madrid Gran Vía. In the 1950s he regularly featured in societé columns, attending aristocratic feasts related and unrelated to his own family. His political engagements were almost inexistent, except that he kept attending the Mártires de la Tradición sermons. This changed abruptly in the mid-1950s. In 1956 Florida was awarded Gran Cruz del Mérito Civil, a very prestigious Francoist honor. In 1957 he was among 70-odd Carlists who concluded their longtime rapprochement with the Alfonsist claimant, Don Juan. Satisfied that formal acceptance of Traditionalist principles rendered him fit for succession also from the Carlist perspective, they declared him the legitimate heir to the throne. Florida, one of the most distinguished of the so-called "Estorilos", entered the claimant's Consejo Privado, the post retained until the end of his life.

Also as an octogenarian Florida kept attending social events, at times assuming unlikely roles; in 1962 he formed part of a jury at a female beauty contest. He remained engaged in religious activities, in particular in ranks of Hermandad de Caballeros de San Juan Bautista y Nuestra Señora de las Mercedes; occasionally he presided over charity initiatives. Cautiously he kept admitting Traditionalist heritage; apart from cultural events like those dedicated to memory of Vázquez de Mella in the late 1960s he engaged in Hermandad de Cristo Rey de Requetés ex Combatientes, formally an organisation of Carlist Civil War combatants though in practice a Traditionalist bulwark in internal Carlist strife, aimed against a newly emergent progressist faction; nothing indicates he was aware of the background and historians extensively discussing internal fragmentation of Carlism in the 1960s and 1970s do not mention his name. Also in the late 1960s he kept cultivating the Juanista link; in the 1970s he was noted only as attending weddings of his grandchildren.

== See also ==
- Carlism
- Traditionalism (Spain)
- Mellismo
- Carlo-francoism
