= José María Mazón Sainz =

Spanish lawyer and Traditionalist politician

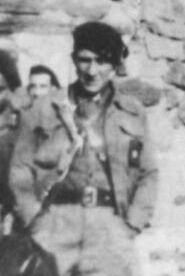
- Born: José María Mazón Sainz; 1901; Haro, Spain
- Died: 1981 (aged 80-81); Madrid, Spain
- Occupation: entrepreneur
- Known for: politician
- Political party: Carlism, FET

José María Mazón Sainz (1901–1981) was a Spanish lawyer and a Traditionalist politician. In the early 1930s he was active within Carlism and rose to party leader in the province of Logroño. Engaged in the coup of July 1936, during the Spanish Civil War he favored unification into the state party. His political career climaxed at the turn of the decades; in 1937–1938 he held a seat in the first Falange Española Tradicionalista executive Junta Política and in 1937–1942 during two first terms he was member of another top party structure, Consejo Nacional. In return, he was expulsed from Comunión Tradicionalista. In the early 1940s he withdrew from politics and led a Madrid law firm.

== Family and youth ==
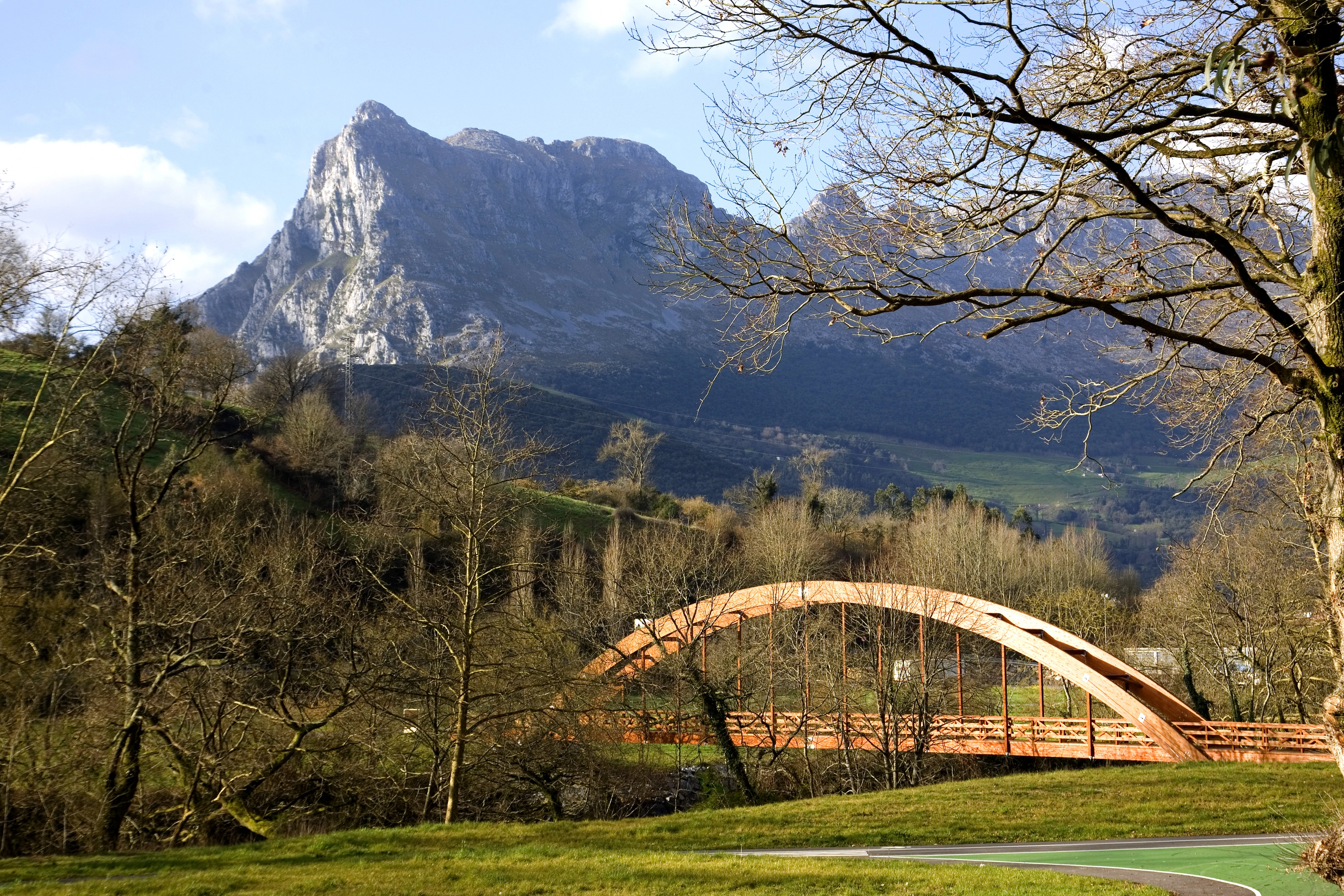
Ramales (present view)

The family of Mazón was first noted in Cantabria; in the modern era it became fairly popular in the then Castilian provinces of Santander and Burgos. The branch which José María descended from was related to the municipality of Ramales, located in the mountainous Cantabrian hinterground area known as Sierra de Rozas. His first identified ancestor was Juan Mazón, though it is not known what he was doing for a living. The son of Juan and the father of José María, Eugenio Mazón Gómez, became a pharmacist. At unspecified time though probably in the 1890s he married Clotilde Sainz. Prior to 1897 (exact year unknown) Mazón Gómez assumed the pharmacy in Haro, at that time a mid-size Riojan town in the province of Logroño.

The couple had 7 children, born between 1894 and 1919; the first two died in their very early infancy and José María was the oldest son and the second oldest sibling who reached mature age, followed by two other sisters and one brother. He spent his early childhood in Haro, though nothing is known about his early schooling. To pursue secondary education in his early teens he moved to the Alavese capital Vitoria, where he started frequenting the local Instituto; in 1913 he was noted for excellent marks. In the second half of the 1910s Mazón commenced law studies at an unspecified university. He graduated in the early 1920s, and in 1922 he was admitted to Cuerpo General de Administración de la Hacienda Pública, a corporative organisation for a branch of civil servants. He returned to Haro and started practicing as a lawyer; in the second half of the 1920s Mazón was on his own representing parties in court.

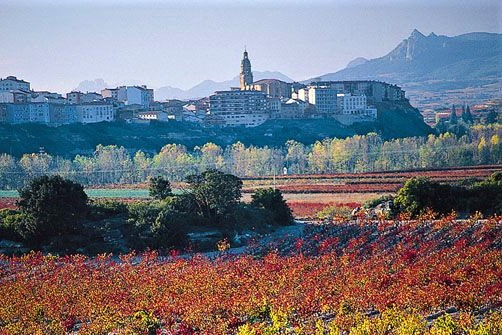
Haro (present view)

Some time prior to 1929 Mazón married Consuelo Verdejo from Haro; nothing is known about her or her family. The couple had 3 children. Verdejo was last noted as Mazón’s wife in 1955. There is no information on her later fate; however, in 1956 Mazón was reported as married to his relative, Emilia Sainz Palomera (died 1989). She originated from Carranza, from a pharmacy-related family, and widowed following an earlier marriage. They had no children. Among the children from the first Mazón’s marriage Eugenio during late Francoism became director general of Correos y Telecomunicaciones and of Obra de 18 Julio; he was moderately engaged in Traditionalism and served in the Cortes in 1971–1976. Among Mazón’s grandchildren from Mazón Lloret, Saavedra Mazón and Martínez del Campo Mazón families the best known is Vega Mazón Lloret; she represents the third generation running the family law firm in Madrid. Mazón’s younger brother Claudio was also moderately involved in Carlist politics.

== Restless Riojan Carlist ==
Carlist standard

Eugenio Mazón was a vehement Carlist; in 1908 he served as secretario general of the movement’s Junta Local in Haro. José María Mazón and his siblings inherited political outlook from their father and were brought up in zealous Carlist ambience; when filling the routine depuration questionnaire in 1940 he noted against the point about membership in political organizations: “I have been a Carlist since February 26, 1901, the day I was born”. However, first information on his public activity is related to primoriverrista structures and generic Catholic circles; in 1923 he was noted as a member of Somatén and in the mid-1920s as a speaker at Cultural Harense, a local Christian ateneo. At the turn of the decades he was already a recognizable local right-wing figure. During local elections of April 1931 he was voted into the Haro ayuntamiento; in the left-wing dominated body he assumed leadership of the opposition “minoría Católico-Monárquica”.

In Haro the Republic years of 1931–1936 were marked by high level of tension in the town hall; Mazón was among the protagonists of the conflict. Having lost the elections for the post of the mayor he protested composition of the local municipal executive, as alcalde and tenientes de alcalde were selected from the victorious Radical-socialist coalition with not a single post of power shared with the opposition minority. As member of comision de instrucción he tried to oppose secular education, protested changes of street names in line with the new Republican fashion, and worked to retain traditional flavor of local popular feasts. Ignored or outvoted, eventually right-wing councillors ceased to attend the town hall meetings. At the same time Mazón mobilized Carlist support in Haro and elsewhere, while his wife animated the local Margaritas organisation.

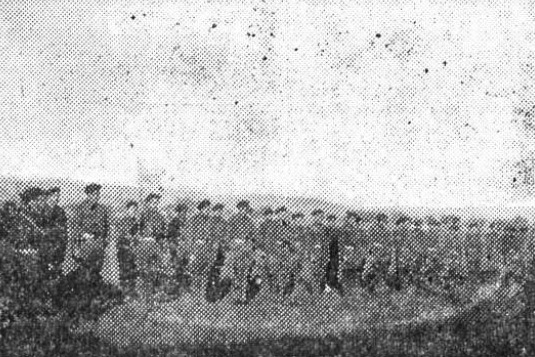
requete detachment from Haro during drills in the countryside, 1935

During the anarchist rising of January 1933 Mazón and right-wing concejales re-appeared in the town hall, declaring the need to ensure law and order; they were ridiculed by the mayor. In return, in 1934 Mazón accused him of promoting unyielding subversive education and fomenting revolution. He remained busy speaking at Carlist rallies in La Rioja and in 1934 he was already acting as the Carlist jefe provincial in Logroño. The year of 1935 produced further propaganda activity of Mazón and his wife. In November he again withdrew from the ayuntamiento claiming that new elections were long overdue and focused on buildup of the local Carlist paramilitary organisation, requeté. He worked for the Carlist cause during the February 1936 general elections; Comunión Tradicionalista candidates gathered 945 votes in Haro, but Frente Popular candidates emerged victorious. Following assassination of a Carlist militant in Haro, in April he formatted the funeral as a Traditionalist demonstration.

== Unification protagonist ==
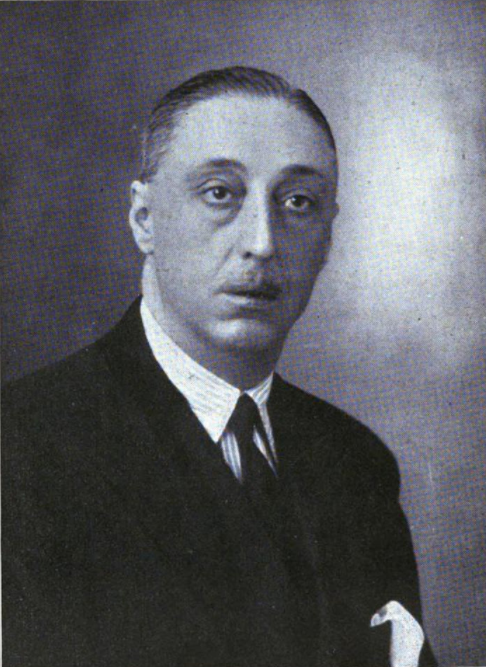
Rodezno

According to his own declaration Mazón collaborated with the military when preparing the July 1936 coup, but no details are known. The province was easily seized by the rebels; on July 29, 1936 Mazón was nominated to comisión gestora, which acted as the new Haro ayuntamiento. There is scarcely any information available on his activities during first months of the war; it is known that his role of the party jefe provincial was converted into the provincial Carlist comisario de guerra. He was first noted as taking part in nationwide executive structures on March 22, 1937, when all provincial comisarios de guerra gathered in Burgos to discuss the threat of would-be amalgamation into a state party. Within the strongly divided body Mazón was among the Rodezno-led faction which supported compliance with the military pressure; they prevailed and he formed part of a 5-member delegation tasked with communicating the news to Franco. Generalissimo saw them on March 27, appeared delighted and asked them to act “in the spirit of unity”.

On March 29 Mazón and other unification-minded Carlists travelled to Lisbon to agree the way forward with the exiled party leader, Manuel Fal Conde. The latter was furious; he accused them of undermining the party and refused to contact them any more. On April 4 Mazón took part in the Pamplona sitting of the Navarrese Junta Central, the foci of unification faction; the present devised a last-minute plan of a directorio of the future state party. Fal dubbed this stand as a coup against the CT authority, but on exile in Portugal he remained powerless. On April 12 Conde Rodezno as leader of the unification-minded Carlists visited Franco to discuss details. The Generalissimo proposed a list of Carlists to enter the planned executive of the new state party, Junta Política. Rodezno responded that it contained too many Navarrese and suggested that a Navarro Marcelino Ulibarri be replaced with Mazón.

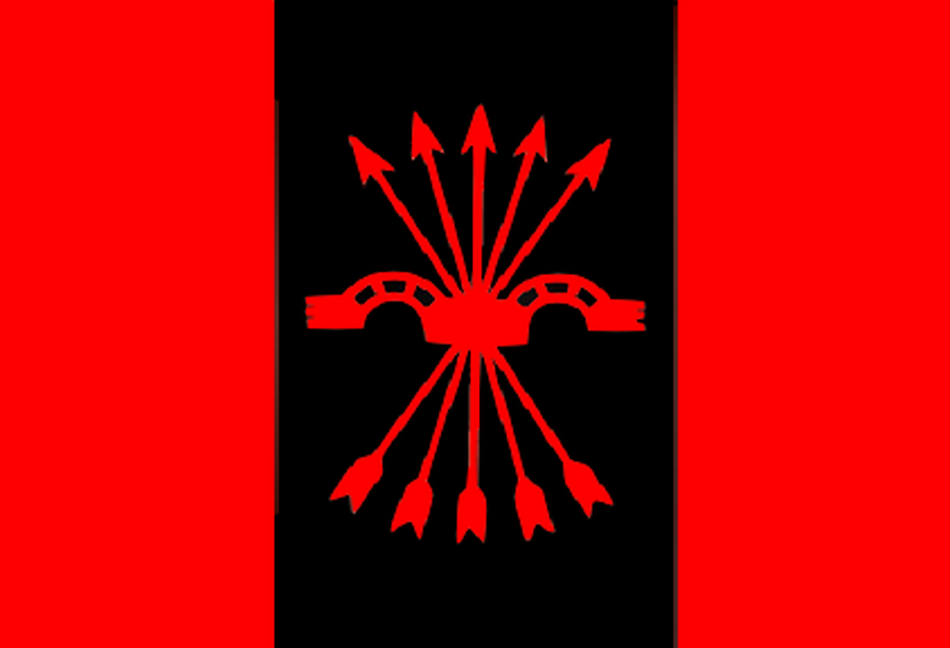
Falangist standard

On April 19 the Franco headquarters issued the Unification Decree, which declared merger of Falangists and Carlists into the new state party, Falange Española Tradicionalista y de las JONS. Mazón acknowledged it the same day with Sesión Extraordinaria de la Comunión Tradicionalista de La Rioja in Miranda de Ebro; the gathering declared “la felicitación más entusiasta” and “más ferviente e incondicional adhesión”, ending with "¡A sus órdenes, mi general!” On April 23 the military administration issued another decree; it named 10 individuals as appointees to the FET Junta Política. Mazón was listed at position #8, as the last Carlist after Rodezno, Florida and Arellano. Thanks to his loyalty to Rodezno within the period of one month Mazón converted from one of 20-odd provincial Carlist comisarios de guerra, barely known beyond his native Logroño province, into one of 10 leaders of the monopolist emergent state party, who might have appeared as the most powerful politicians in the Nationalist Spain.

== Francoist hierarch ==
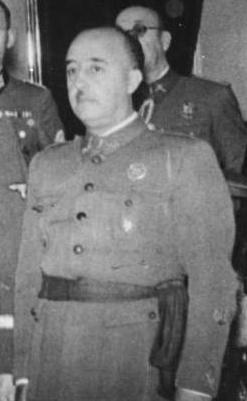
Franco, 1940

In June 1937 Mazón suffered major though not life-threatening injuries during a car crash; he spent two months under intense treatment and returned home in August. In late summer of 1937 he was back to political duties, still operating within the personal circle of Conde Rodezno. All Carlist members of Junta Política attempted to remain on correct terms with the regent-claimant Don Javier and declared that within Falange Española Tradicionalista they worked to ensure Traditionalist domination in the state party structures. However, among the Javieristas they were increasingly viewed as half-traitors who pushed towards unification and undermined the Carlist political identity. In October 1937 Franco made a further step on the path towards institutionalization and appointed members of a new Falangist command structure, Consejo Nacional; among its 50 members there were 12 Carlists, and Mazón was on the list. In unclear circumstances his Junta Politica term expired by March 1938.

In 1938 Mazón remained engaged in FET organization work and mass rallies nationwide; his wife was active in the Frentes y Hospitales section. First months following unification were marked by fierce competition between the Carlists and the Falangists; the latter were clearly gaining the upper hand, and soon Carlist heavyweights within FET were getting bombarded with protests from the rank-and-file, who complained about Traditionalist marginalisation in the state party. However, there is nothing known about Mazón objecting to Carlist disempowerment. Quite the opposite; Mazón demonstrated full alignment with the Falangist domination and unlike most other unificated Carlists he sported an all-black uniform “de los falangistas más radicales”. Eventually Fal Conde and Don Javier concluded that Mazón and other party members who engaged in buildup of the Francoist regime went off limits; in July 1938 they were expulsed from Comunión Tradicionalista.

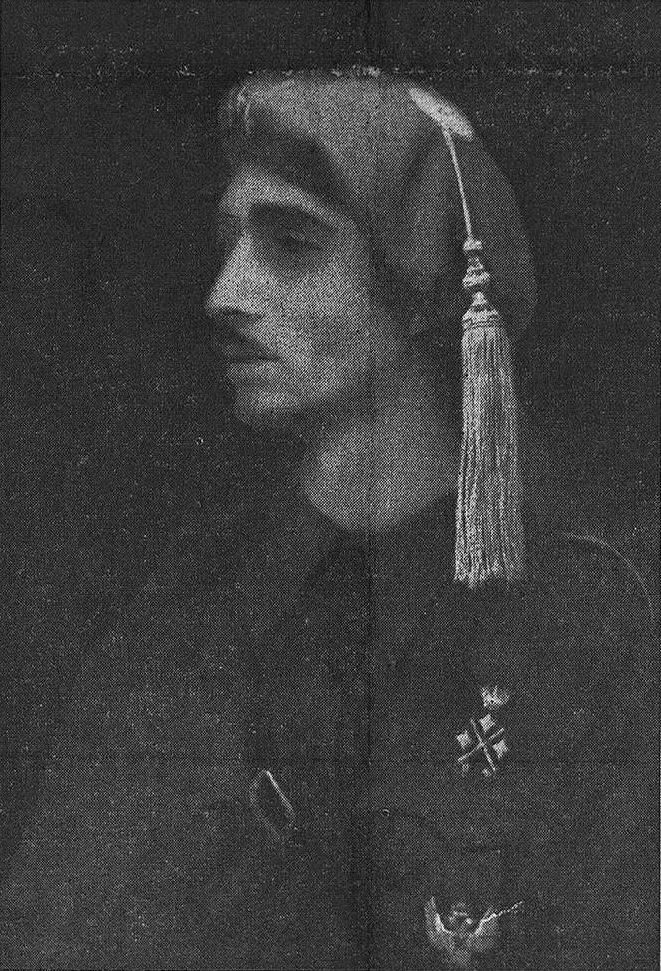
Don Javier, late 1930s

Mazón, who kept considering himself a Carlist, did not pay much attention to expulsion. In March 1939 he accepted Franco’s nomination to Tribunal Nacional de Responsabilidades Políticas, a judiciary body set up to deal with top-placed Republicans who fell into the Nationalists’ hands. In September 1939 his term in Consejo Nacional of FET expired; Mazón was nominated to the II Consejo, this time as one of 13 Carlists among 96 members of the mammoth institution. In 1940 he was still taking part in various pompous Francoist ceremonies, yet at the same time he started to prepare his exit from politics. In 1941 he was dismissed from Tribunal Nacional de Responsabilidades Políticas. In the autumn of 1942, when the term of II Consejo Nacional came to the end, he was consulted by the Franco’s entourage whether he would like to go on; however, Mazón declared he wanted to leave politics. As a result, in November 1942 he was not nominated to the III Consejo Nacional.

== Businessman and retiree ==
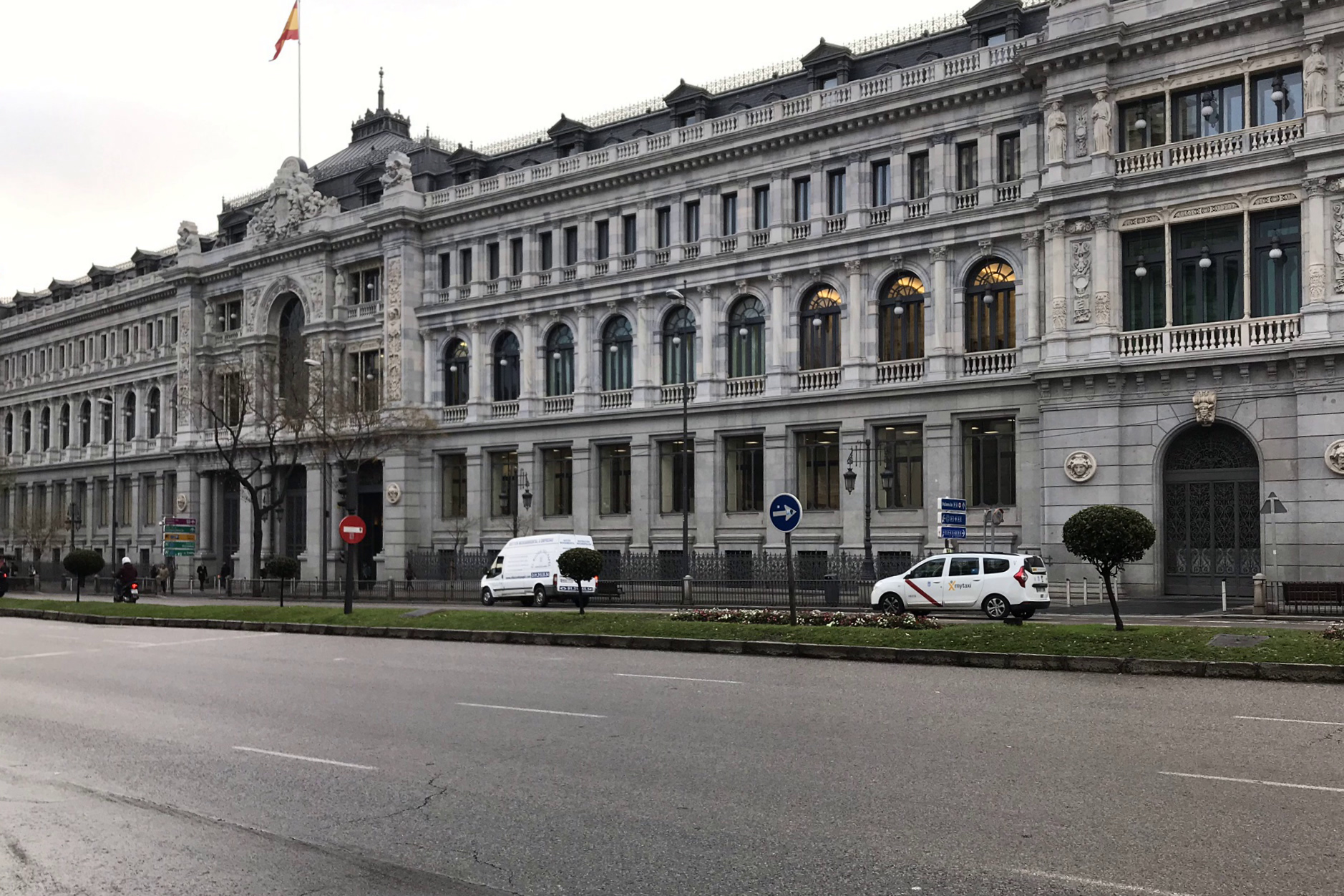
Banco de España headquarters

Starting 1943 Mazón was a private person with no official duties. Already 3 years earlier he ensured his admittance to Colegio de Abogados de Madrid, with references to be provided by Conde Rodezno. In the 1940s he set up his own law firm, later to be known as Mazón Abogados; his clients were major institutional customers, including Banco de España. At one point Mazón became asesor jurídico of the central bank and he kept performing this role at least until the early 1960s. At that time he was already joined by his son Eugenio, who was gradually taking over management of Mazón Abogados and juridical services of Banco de España; however, José Maria was listed as abogado en ejercicio until the late 1960s.

Since the mid-1940s Mazón stayed clear of politics. He did not join any Carlist initiatives, be it those originating among the Javieristas or those related to Rodezno, who was increasingly leaning towards the dynastic leadership of Don Juan. He was admitted at a personal audience by Franco in 1954, 1956 and 1961. Since the mid-1950s he was anxious to shake off last vestiges of fascism and enlarged the Traditionalist contingent in the Cortes. However, in the early 1960s Mazón was consulted by the FET Consejo Nacional during works on the new Fuero del Trabajo.

According to some sources during mid-Francoism the likes of Mazón were entirely ignored by mainstream Carlists as traitors not to be dealt with; when already as a retiree he appeared during Día de Santiago in Haro, he was pushed out by militant young Carlists; also Eugenio was ostracized when taking part in the Montejurra ascents. However, when in 1958 Eugenio was getting married, the ceremony was attended – apart from carlo-franquistas like Esteban Bilbao – also by the Comunión leader José Maria Valiente and by José Luis Zamanillo. Moreover, the official press note claimed that "apadrinaron el enlace SS. AA. RR. don Francisco Javier de Borbon Parma y su augusta esposa".

Family events were the only opportunities when at the time Mazón was being mentioned in the press, always in the societé columns. During the wedding of his daughter María in 1967 or during the engagement ceremony of another daughter Margarita in 1968 the only political heavyweight present was the former Carlist turned the Cortes speaker, Antonio Iturmendi. The 1971 wedding of a more distant relative was attended only by family and friends. In the 1970s Mazón disappeared entirely from the public eye. Following death the only necrological note published in the press was this signed by his close family.

== See also ==
- Carlism
- Traditionalism (Spain)
- Carlo-francoism
- Unification Decree (Spain, 1937)
