= Nicolás Estévanez =

Spanish military officer, politician, essayist and poet

Nicolás Estévanez Murphy
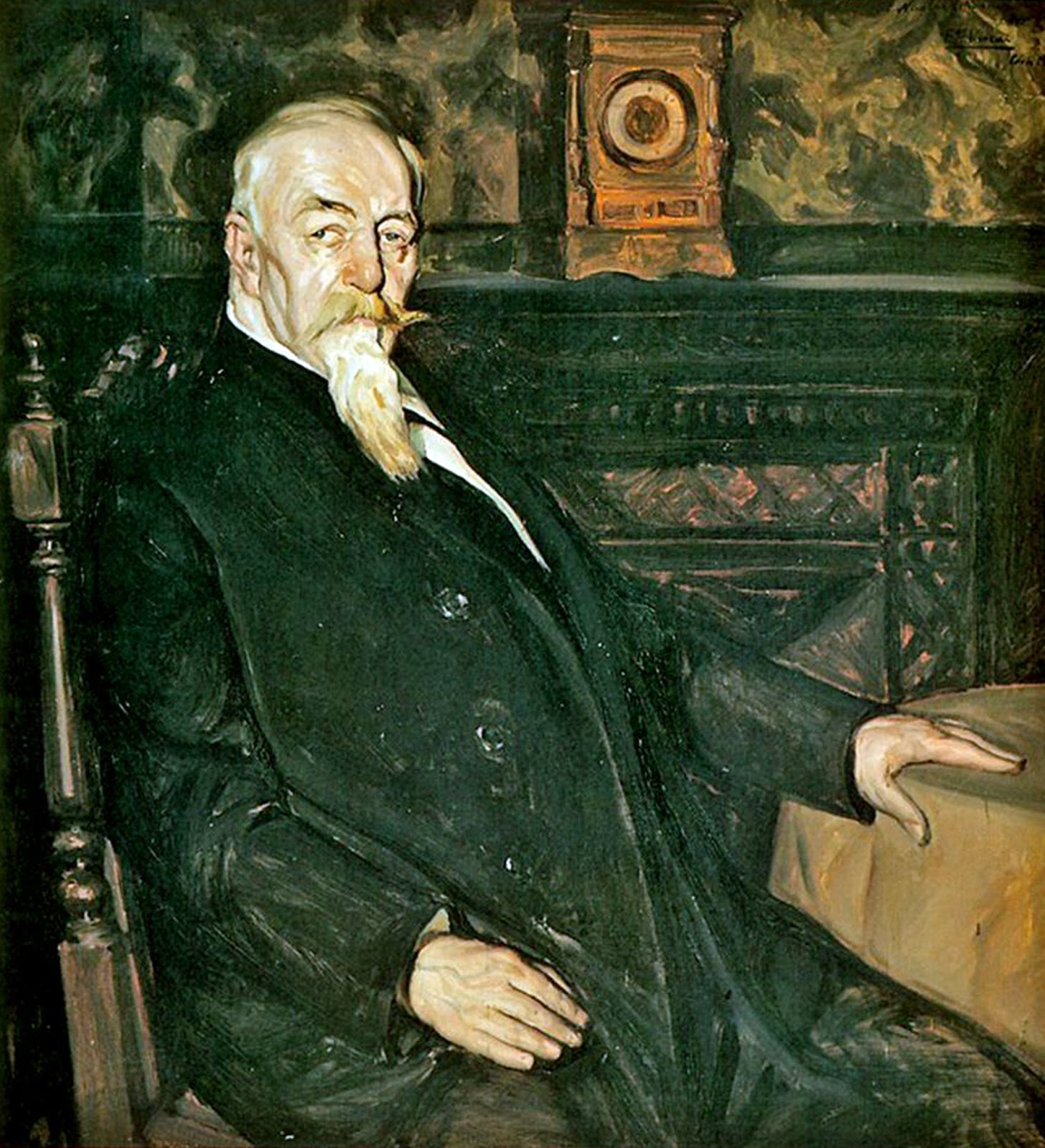
- Born: 17 February 1838; Las Palmas de Gran Canaria, Spain
- Died: 19 August 1914 (aged 76); Paris, France
- Relatives: Francisco de Paula Estévanez (father); Isabel Murphy y Meade (mother)
- Military career
- Allegiance: (Restoration (Spain)) Spain
- Service years: 1852–1871
- Rank: Captain
- Conflicts: Hispano-Moroccan War (1859–1860): Battle of Tétouan; Battle of Castillejos; Dominican Restoration War Ten Years' War Glorious Revolution (Spain) Spanish Republic insurrection of 1869 Cantonal Rebellion

Minister of War of Spain
- In office 11 June – 28 June 1873
- President of the Executive Power: Francesc Pi i Margall
- Preceded by: Estanislao Figueras (as acting)
- Succeeded by: Eulogio González Íscar

Civil governor of Madrid
- In office 24 February – 11 June 1873
- President of the Executive Power: Francesc Pi i Margall
- Minister of Governance: Francesc Pi i Margall
- Preceded by: Joaquim Fiol
- Succeeded by: Juan José Hidalgo y Caballero

Nicolás Estévanez Murphy (17 February 1838 – 19 August 1914) was a Spanish military officer, politician, essayist and poet. A federal republican, he briefly served as civil governor of Madrid and as Minister of War in the wake of the proclamation of the First Spanish Republic. A defender of the Africanness of his native Canary Islands, which were a central motif of his written work, he espoused a blend of anti-European, atheist, anticlerical, revolutionary and anarchist ideals. While he showed an unwavering commitment to Spanish patriotism, Estévanez has been reconstructed as a sort of father of Canarian nationalism by Canarian nationalist authors. He was a close collaborator of Francisco Pi y Margall.

== Biography ==
Nicolás Estévanez Murphy was born in Las Palmas de Gran Canaria on 17 February 1838, the son of captain Francisco de Paula Estébanez y García Caballero (a progressive military officer from Málaga, Andalusia) and Isabel Murphy y Meade (a Canarian woman descended from Irish merchants settled in the islands in the late 18th century). Very young, in 1852, he entered the military academy in Toledo. After graduating, he served in the 1859–1860 African War. He took part in a number of war actions, including the 4 February 1860 Battle of Tétouan, after which he was awarded the 1st Class of the Cross of St. Ferdinand.

On 27 November 1871, he was stationed in Cuba with the rank of captain when eight students were executed by the authorities who found them guilty of anti-Spanish activities and of vandalizing some tomb sites. On hearing the news he publicly protested and, for this reason, was expelled from the army but he never apologized or renounced his actions and was always proud of what he did. To this day, on the façade of the Hotel Inglaterra in Havana, Cuba, there is a plaque bearing his name and commemorating his protest.

He participated in the revolution of September 1868 and joined the republican insurrection of 1869 for which he was imprisoned.

He later was elected member of parliament and was appointed minister in the cabinet of Pi y Margall during the First Spanish Republic but with the restoration of the monarchy he went into exile in Paris, France.

Described in police reports as an "everlasting conspirator and expert in explosive devices", he has been pointed out as a presumed plotter in the attempted regicide of Alfonso XIII on 31 May 1906. He would have moved from his Parisian exile to Barcelona earlier in the month, reportedly holding a meeting at Tibidabo with Francisco Ferrer and Mateo Morral—the physical perpetrator—before leaving for Cuba.

He died on 19 August 1914 in Paris.
