= Ramón Altarriba y Villanueva =

Spanish politician and businessman

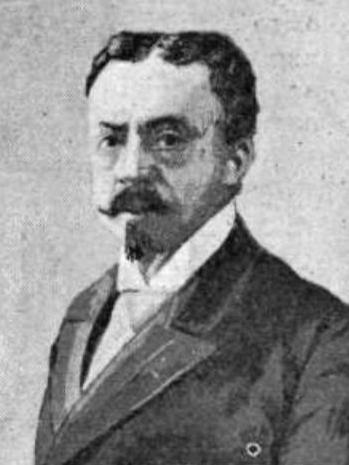
- Born: Ramón Altarriba y Villanueva; 30 August 1841; Bayonne, France
- Died: 1 April 1906 (aged 64); Madrid, Spain
- Cause of death: war
- Citizenship: spanish
- Occupation: landowner
- Known for: politician
- Political party: Carlism

Ramón Altarriba y Villanueva, 1st Count of Altarriba, 24th Baron of Sangarrén (1841–1906), was a Spanish Carlist politician, landowner, publisher, and soldier. During the Third Carlist War he commanded battalion-size legitimist units. He represented the party in the lower chamber of the Cortes during 2 terms of 1879-1881 and 1886-1890. In the 1890s and early 1900s he served as the party leader in the region of Old Castile, though as one of the largest landholders in Gipuzkoa he exerted also enormous influence in the province.

== Family and youth ==
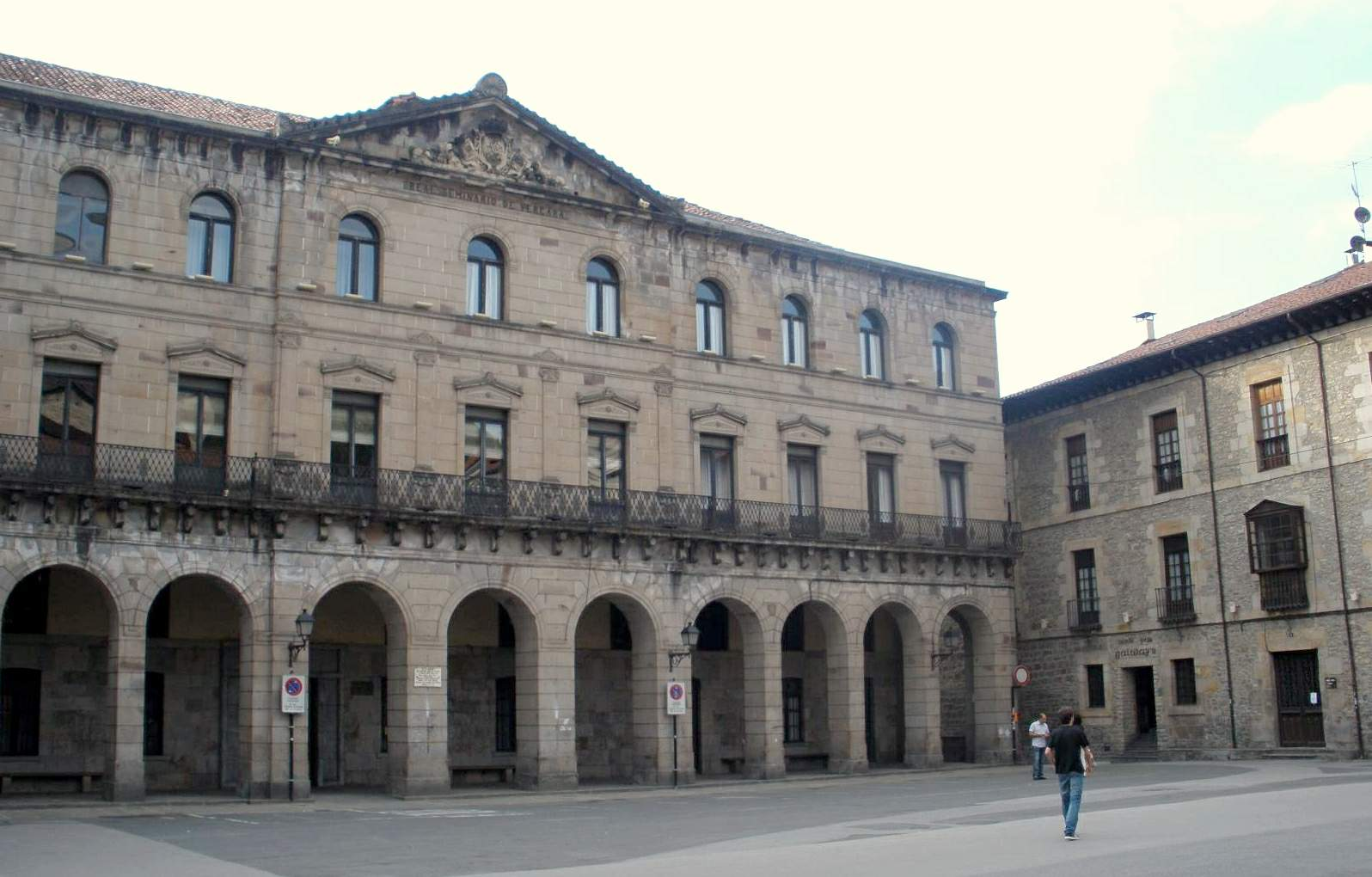
Bergara, former Seminario Cientifico

Ramón Altarriba y Villanueva was born into a distinguished aristocratic Aragonese family of Altarriba. Possibly from the old distinguished Catalan noble family of Altarriba in Catalonia, part of the Crown of Aragon at the time, it held baronia de Sangarrén since the 14th century and condado de Robres since the 18th century; its representatives were many times noted in the history of Aragón and Zaragoza. His paternal grandmother, María Bernarda Colón Serra, was a descendant of Christopher Columbus. Ramón's father, José de Altarriba y Colón de Larreátegui (1804-1870), 11th conde de Robres and 22nd barón de Sangarrén, was a Carlist highly esteemed by Carlos VI; no details of his involvement in the movement are available. Ramón's mother, also from Aragón, María Pilar Villanueva y Altarriba (1820-1895), was daughter of conde de Atarés and second cousin of his father José.

None of the sources consulted clarifies why the family lived in the French Bayonne, a usual location for Carlist exiles and refugees fleeing Spain in the aftermath of defeat suffered during the First Carlist War. Ramón was one of 8 siblings and the second oldest son. His older brother, José María, upon return to Aragón followed the family path and also engaged in Carlist activities, which did not prevent him from becoming comisario regio for Zaragoza in 1869; he inherited all family titles in 1870. Ramón as a youngster moved from France to Spain and entered Real Seminario Científico Industrial, a state-ran and highly esteemed Gipuzkoan educational establishment in Bergara. He is reported as enrolled in 1854, though it is not clear when he completed the curriculum; the standard cycle lasted 5 years.

Ramón Altarriba y Villanueva married Rosa Guerra y Serbi; nothing is known of this marriage, apart that his wife died in 1875 and the couple had no issue. He then espoused María de la Blanca Porcel y Guirior (1859-1940), heir to aristocratic family originating from Gipuzkoa and Andalusia. Since her father died in 1873 with no male descendants, having been the oldest daughter she arranged to inherit his titles as 7th marquesa de Villa Alegre and San Millán; Altarriba became marqués consorte. The couple had two sons, Ramón and Jaime Altarriba y Porcel. Nothing is known about the former; the latter (1884–1936) joined artillery and pursued a military career. He became comandante de Artilleria, maestrante de la Real Maestranza de la Caballeria de Zaragoza and an entrepreneur. Also an active Carlist, in 1934 he headed finance section of Comunión Tradicionalista. The 1936 coup surprised him in the Gipuzkoan spa of Zestoa, where he was detained by the republican militia and died.

== War and war ==
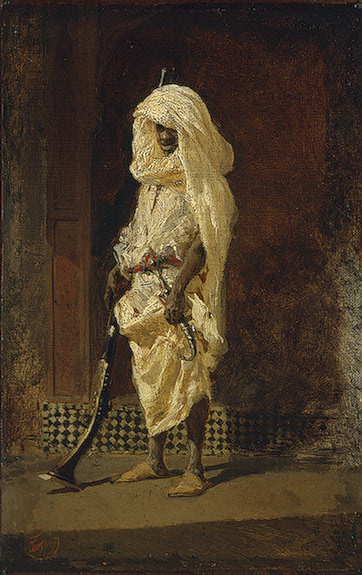
Moroccan soldier 1860

Upon the outbreak of Primera Guerra de Marruecos in 1859 the young Altarriba volunteered to the army; accepted, he was assigned to the Aragon infantry unit of Regimento de Zamora and landed in Ceuta in December 1859. Details of his service are unclear, though he certainly entered many combat actions against the Moroccan troops. Serving under the command of Antonio Ros de Olano in January 1860 he might have taken part in the battle of Castillejos; bypassing Monte Negrón in a dare Spanish maneuver, he then participated in the battle of Cabo Negro. For meritorious service Altarriba was awarded Cruz de San Fernando and got promoted to teniente. Late 1860 the unit returned to the Zaragoza barracks. Apparently enjoying adventurous life and vivacious company, he demonstrated some gift for rhyming couplets; at that time he befriended Nicolas Estevanez Murphy. During the next few years Altarriba continued his military career, though no details are known.

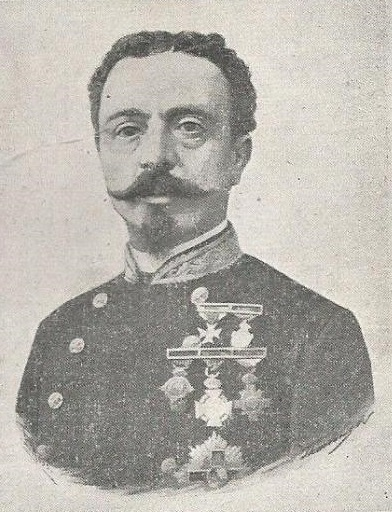
Barón de Sangarren

Following the Revolution of 1868 Altarriba requested and was granted release from military service, though he returned to the army in 1871. Once the Republic was declared he approached the conspiring Carlists and at the outbreak of the Third Carlist War he was already incorporated in their army. He was assigned to the Northern Front and took command of an insurgent volunteer Biscay battalion, which conquered and cleared the Durango district in 1873. Promoted to coronel, he then commanded primera brigada de Vizcaya and joined the siege of Bilbao in early 1874; he led the unit routing the Republican forces during the battle of Somorrostro and advancing later to Portugalete, where Altarriba was given the privilege of accepting surrender of the famous battalón de Segorbe. Participated in a number of skirmishes at the outskirts of Bilbao, assaulting the forts of Delmas and Volantín. Nominated Comandante General del Alto Aragón, Altarriba was the organizer, sponsor and commander of Battalón de Almogávares de la Virgen del Pilar, leading it early 1875 during the defense of the so-called línea de Carrascal and in the Navarrese battles of Lumbier and Etxauri. In final phase of the war and in unclear circumstances there was an investigative proceeding launched against Altarriba; eventually cleared of all charges, he was promoted to brigadier. Located in mid-range command chain, he did not make it amongst top Carlist commanders and did not supervise operations above the tactical level. Nominated adjutant to Carlos VII, in reward for his service Altarriba was conceded the title of conde de Altarriba.

== Early Restauración ==
Carlist standard

A widower with no close family, it is not clear where Altarriba settled after the war; in 1877 he was linked to the Catalan town of Aviá. In 1878 he was already married and assumed administration of his wife's property in Gipuzkoa. The estates slightly exceeding 1,000 ha rendered the couple the 4th largest terratenientes in the province and one of the richest people in Gipuzkoa. His wife held land also in Álava and Andalusia; for some time Altarriba managed the Pinos Puente estate in Granada, which she possessed jointly with her two unmarried sisters, though with a rather mediocre result. In 1878 José María Altarriba, unmarried and with no issue, renounced baronia in favor of his younger brother, making Ramón the 24th barón de Sangarrén.

Altarriba seemed pessimistic as to the future of Carlism, considered orphaned, with no political direction and managed by ineffective Junta Militar. In 1878 he wrote to Carlos VII urging him to appoint a strong political leader. As in early 1879 the military rule was terminated and civic rights restored in Gipuzkoa, Altarriba – already admitted to a meeting of leading Carlists – spoke in favor of taking part in the elections. The claimant allowed only individual unofficial contenders and authorized Sangarrén. Fielding his candidature in the Azpeitia district, Altarriba was considered one of the 4 "transigentes" running; he emerged as the only one victorious. Elected, he settled permanently in Madrid. He attempted re-election in 1881 but lost both in Tolosa and Azpeitia.

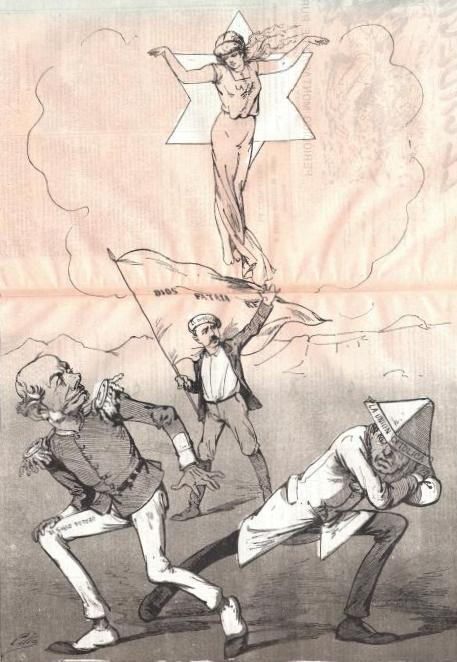
guerra periodistica

The 1880s are marked by growing rivalry within Carlism, divided between the immovilistas and the aperturistas. The former, led by Candido Nocedal, opted for intransigence. The latter, Altarriba included, dismissed either war or total abstention, preferring conditional alignment with the new political system. The dispute grew into a full-scale conflict, waged also by means of guerra periodistica; to fight the Nocedalista titles, Sangarrén founded a Madrid satirical weekly, El Cabecilla. During the 1884 election campaign Altarriba sought Carlos VII's exemption from "despotism" of Nocedal, who ordered abstention, but this time the claimant did not agree and Sangarrén loyally withdrew from the race 3 weeks prior to election date. Two years later, already a recognized Carlist leader, he obtained the permission and was re-elected from Azpeitia. Focused on by the press as a single Carlist in the Cortes, when sworn Altarriba declared in the house that he considered Carlos VII the king of Spain.

As the Nocedalista crisis entered its terminal phase, in 1887 Altarriba engaged in a related conflict with Francisco Cavero y Alvarez de Toledo, the jefe of Aragón, with Carlos VII intervening and ordering truce; some authors claim that Cavero was dismissed. Though assaulted by the Nocedalista press for his defense of Manifesto de Morentin, in the unfolding press war Altarriba defended the vacillating La Fe and did not side unconditionally with the claimant; Carlos VII's entourage counted him among "malos Carlistas". Somewhat accidentally triggering the final breakup in Vascongadas, at the decisive moment he stayed loyal to his king.

== Personal political climax ==
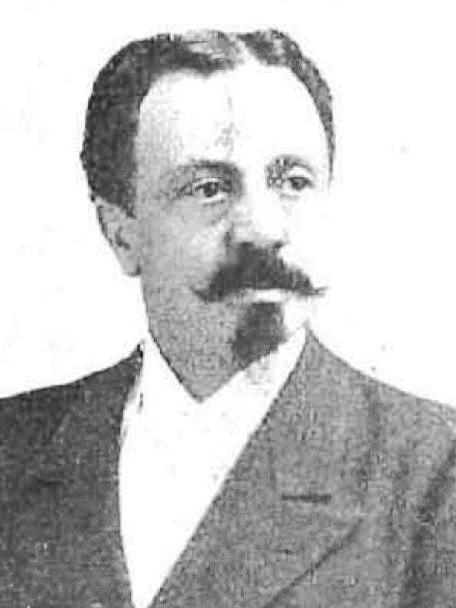
Altarriba in his 50s

Following secession of the Integristas Altarriba, the only party MP and one of its few aristocrats, found himself in the top strata of Carlism and became one if its most distinguished politicians. His relations with other party leaders were uneasy, even after the departure of the allegedly hated Nocedal. The undisputed Traditionalist leader in Vascongadas marqués de Valde-Espina, the claimant's personal secretary conde de Melgar and the aspiring political leader, marqués de Cerralbo found it difficult to work with Sangarrén and did not spare him harsh words; in the intrigue-ridden world of Carlism of the late 19th century he was accused of envy towards legitimate party leaders and turning Gipuzkoa into his personal fiefdom. When in late 1888 he was appointed vice-president of the newly established Junta Directiva del Circulo Tradicionalista de Madrid, he refused the post claiming – probably sarcastically – that he did not merit such an honor.

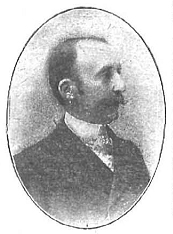
marqués de Cerralbo

In 1889 Carlos VII started to build formal nationwide party structures, initially disguised as an organization to stage celebrations of Conversión de Recaredo centenary; within its Junta Central, soon turned into a permanent collegial executive, Sangarrén was nominated to represent Castilla la Vieja. Like 10 years earlier, he called for a new jefe which would impose the party discipline, though it is not clear whether he himself hoped for the job. In the fall of that year, the liberal press speculated about a directorate leading the movement and mentioned him as one of its 4 members. Altarriba's position was confirmed when he was invited to Frohsdorf for the wedding of Carlos VII's daughter. Though in early 1890 El Cabecilla mocked marqués de Cerralbo, when later that year the latter was finally appointed the new Jefe Delegado Sangarrén rushed with congratulations, directed to "mi querido amigo".

Ahead of the 1891 elections for the first time during Restoration the Carlists decided to take part officially and set up a co-ordinating committee. Details of its work are not known; the outcome was that in Azpeitia, which turned into a prestigious battlefield against the rebellious Ramón Nocedal, Sangarrén had to give way to the aspiring Gipuzkoan leader, Tírso de Olazábal. Himself he ran in two districts, Aranda de Duero (Burgos) and Santo Domingo de la Calzada (Logroño), losing in both. Following this defeat, he did not renew his electoral bid in any of the successive electoral campaigns.

== Mid-Restauración ==
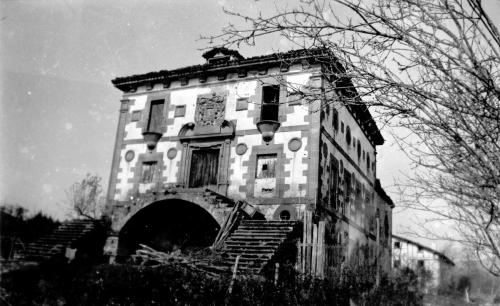
Sangarrén residence, Gipuzkoa

Having lost the parliamentary ticket Sangarrén could dedicate more time to his private business, geographically scattered from Vascongadas across Castille and on to Andalusia. Apart from managing family estates in Gipuzkoa, he invested in the mining and metalworking industry. He co-owned exploration rights to a copper mine in the Sierra de Guadarrama location of Colmenarejo, North of Madrid. In 1893 he took control over the "La Fe" mineral springs in the nearby Moralzarzal, renaming the site "Mudarra" and exploiting it until 1900, when he renounced the concession. He held stakes in paper mill business in Pyrenaic parts of the Lérida province and was vice-president of Derecha del Rio Genil, a Granada-based company engaged in irrigation works.

As the Carlist fuerista principles envisaged that a politician should only represent the region where he lives, within the party command structures Altarriba formally headed Castilla la Vieja. Though due to his terrateniente status he exercised the largest influence in Gipuzkoa, Vascongadas was first headed by Valde-Espina, then by Salvador Elío y Ezpeleta and later by Tirso de Olazábal. Altarriba's contribution to Gipuzkoan Carlism, however, remained crucial; local landowners were key to mobilising rural support and maintaining – if not straightforwardly financing – provincial party structures. Partially as a result of his contribution, in the 1880s and 1890s Gipuzkoa emerged as a Carlist stronghold; in provincial and general elections the party was striving for dominance.

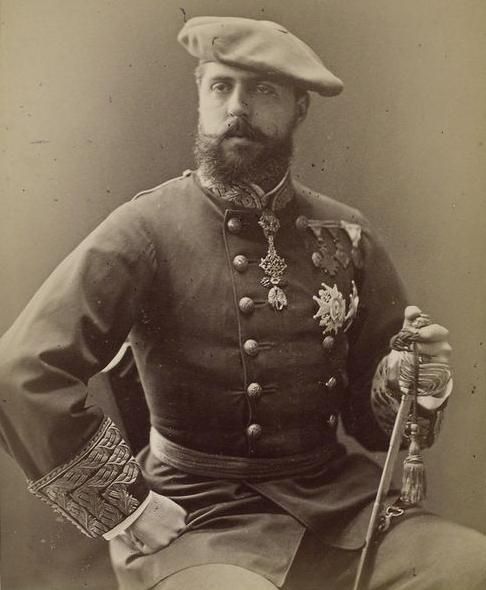
Carlos VII

In the early 1890s fellow Traditionalists approached Altarriba cautiously as one of "fractious Carlists". Some sources report him as championing a militant "de armas tomar" group, consisting mostly of the Navarros and the Gipuzkoanos. Other episodes seem to counter this thesis indicating that he worked closely with the non-belligerent de Cerralbo, together travelling across Spain during innovative political tours and delivering harangues, also jointly with Carlist pundits like Vazquez de Mella; residing in Madrid he customarily appeared in events staged in the capital. As the colonial crisis of 1897 unfolded, he initially seemed leaning towards a bold action; he welcomed general Weyler, dismissed from Cuba, amongst the crowd shouting "Viva Cuba Española", but also a somewhat more ambiguous "a caballo mi general". However, during the Spanish–American War Sangarrén was busy denouncing widely circulating rumors about another Carlist insurgency forthcoming as "a fable", though it is not clear whether it was a pre-agreed propaganda smokescreen or a genuine effort. During La Octubrada, the series of minor Carlist revolts of October 1900, he was in Paris, which did not spare him detention by Guardia Civil the following month in Bilbao. Also during persistent rumors of mid-1902 Altarriba spoke publicly against a Carlist military action. The press reported him as an agreed Carlist candidate in the 1903 elections, but he was not mentioned as running later on. None of the sources consulted mentions him politically active after that date; obituaries claimed he had been suffering from an unidentified longtime "enfermedad crónica"; his funeral was attended by the then Carlist political leader, Matías Barrio y Mier.

== See also ==
- Carlism
- Electoral Carlism (Restoration)
- Hispano-Moroccan War (1859–60)
- Third Carlist War
- Enrique de Aguilera y Gamboa
- Matías Barrio y Mier
