= Eulogio Despujol y Dusay =

Spanish Governor-General of the Philippines

The Most Illustrious General Eulogio Despujol y Dusay Count of Caspe
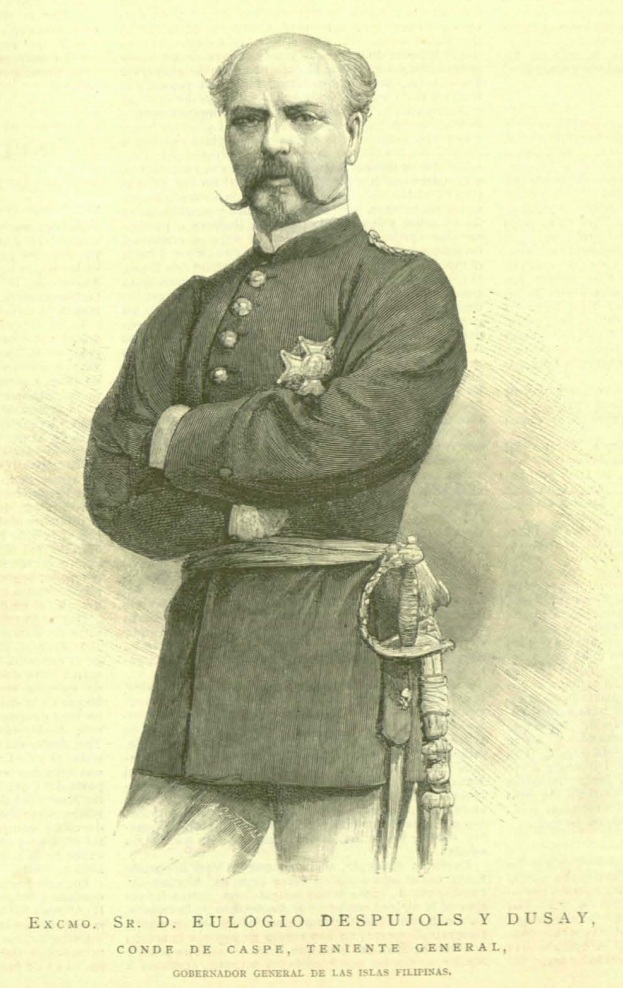
- Eulogio Despujol y Dusay

109th Governor-General of the Philippines
- In office 17 November 1891 – 1 March 1893
- Monarch: Alfonso XIII
- Regent: Maria Christina of Austria
- Prime Minister: Antonio Cánovas del Castillo; Praxedes Mateo Sagasta
- Minister of Overseas: Antonio María Fabié; Francisco Romero Robledo; Antonio Maura
- Preceded by: Valeriano Weyler, 1st Duke of Rubí
- Succeeded by: Federico Ochando

125th Governor of Puerto Rico
- In office 24 April 1878 – 30 April 1881
- Monarch: Alfonso XII
- Prime Minister: Antonio Cánovas del Castillo; Arsenio Martínez-Campos; Antonio Cánovas del Castillo; Práxedes Mateo Sagasta
- Minister of Overseas: José Elduayen Gorriti; Cayetano Sánchez Bustillo; Fernando León y Castillo
- Preceded by: José Gámir Maladén
- Succeeded by: Segundo de la Portilla Gutiérrez

128th Captain General of Catalonia
- In office 19 January 1896 – 28 December 1899
- Monarch: Alfonso XIII
- Regent: Maria Christina of Austria
- Prime Minister: Antonio Cánovas del Castillo; Marcelo Azcárraga Palmero; Práxedes Mateo Sagasta; Francisco Silvela
- Minister of War: Marcelo Azcárraga Palmero; Miguel Correa y García; Camilo García de Polavieja
- Preceded by: Valeriano Weyler
- Succeeded by: Manuel Delgado y Zuleta

83rd Captain General of Valencia
- In office 3 April 1876 – 16 April 1878
- Monarch: Alfonso XII
- Prime Minister: Antonio Cánovas del Castillo
- Minister of War: Francisco de Ceballos y Vargas
- Preceded by: Manuel Lassala i Solera
- Succeeded by: Ramon Fajardo e Izquierdo

Captain General of New Castile
- In office 15 December 1875 – 3 April 1876
- Monarch: Alfonso XII
- Prime Minister: Antonio Cánovas del Castillo
- Minister of War: Francisco de Ceballos y Vargas
- Preceded by: Fernando Primo de Rivera
- Succeeded by: Fernando Primo de Rivera

69th Captain General of Aragon
- In office 6 April – 25 July 1875
- Monarch: Alfonso XII
- Prime Minister: Antonio Cánovas del Castillo
- Minister of War: Joaquín Jovellar y Soler
- Preceded by: Carlos Yauch Condamy
- Succeeded by: Ramon Fajardo e Izquierdo

Personal details
- Born: Eulogio Despujol y Dusay; 11 March 1834 Barcelona, Spain
- Died: 19 October 1907 (aged 73) Riba-roja de Túria, Spain
- Spouse: Leonor Rigalt Muns
- Children: Eulogio Despujol y Rigalt; Ignasi Maria Despujol i Dusay
- Parent(s): José María Despujol y Ferrer de Sant Jordi (father); María Ana Dussay y Fivaller (mother)

Military service
- Allegiance: (Restoration (Spain)) Spain
- Branch/service: (Restoration (Spain)) Spanish Army
- Years of service: 1857–1906
- Rank: General
- Battles/wars: Hispano-Moroccan War (1859–1860): Battle of Wad Ras; Dominican Restoration War Third Carlist War Little War

Eulogio Despujol y Dusay, 1st Count of Caspe (Catalan: Eulogi Despujol i Dusay; 11 March 1834 – 18 October 1907) served as the Spanish Governor-General of the Philippines between 1891 and 1893.

Alfonso XII granted him the nobiliary title of Count of Caspe after his win in the battle that took place in the town of the same name during the Third Carlist War.

A native of Catalonia, at first, he ruled in the Philippines as a Conservative but later became a Liberal. It was during his term when José Rizal, leader of the Philippine propaganda movement, was sent to Dapitan in Mindanao. He would again meet with Rizal, who was on his way to Cuba to work as a military medic before being intercepted in Barcelona, before sending him back to the Philippines where he lived the rest of his life.

Government offices
Preceded by José Gamir Maladen	Governor of Puerto Rico; 1878–1881	Succeeded by Segundo de la Portilla Gutiérrez
Preceded by Valeriano Weyler y Nicolau	Governor-General of the Philippines; 1891–1893	Succeeded by Federico Ochando
Preceded by Valeriano Weyler y Nicolau	Captain General of Catalonia; 1896–1899	Succeeded by Manuel Delgado Zuleta
Spanish nobility
New title	Count of Caspe; 1878–1907	Succeeded by Ignacio Despujol y Rigalt
