= Francisco de Ceballos y Vargas =

Spanish Lieutenant General

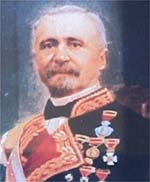

Minister of War of Spain
- In office December 21, 1875 – March 7, 1879
- Monarch: Alfonso XII
- Prime Minister: Antonio Cánovas del Castillo
- Preceded by: Joaquín Jovellar
- Succeeded by: Arsenio Martínez Campos

Captain General of Valencia
- In office December 5, 1873 – January 19, 1874
- President of the Executive Power: Emilio Castelar; Francisco Serrano
- Minister of War: José Sánchez Bregua; Juan Zavala y de la Puente
- Preceded by: Arsenio Martínez Campos
- Succeeded by: Segundo de la Portilla Gutiérrez

Captain General of the Basque Country
- In office September 8 – September 29, 1873
- President of the Executive Power: Emilio Castelar
- Minister of War: Jacobo Oreyro y Villavicencio (as acting); José Sánchez Bregua (as acting)
- Preceded by: José María de Loma
- Succeeded by: Cándido Pieltain y Jove-Huergo

Captain General of Cuba
- In office July 11, 1872 – April 18, 1873
- Monarch: Amadeo I
- Prime Minister: Manuel Ruiz Zorrilla
- President of the Executive Power: Estanislao Figueras
- Minister of Overseas: Eduardo Gasset y Artime; Tomás Mosquera; Nicolás Salmerón; José Cristóbal Sorní y Grau
- Preceded by: Blas Villate
- Succeeded by: Cándido Pieltaín

Personal details
- Born: October 9, 1814 Torrelavega, Cantabria, Spain
- Died: March 9, 1883 (aged 68) Madrid, Community of Madrid, Spain

Military service
- Allegiance: Kingdom of Spain; Spanish Republic
- Branch: Spanish Army
- Years of service: 1833 — 1883
- Rank: Lieutenant General
- Battles/wars: First Carlist War; Hispano-Moroccan War; Ten Years' War; Cantonal Revolution

Francisco de Paula de Ceballos and Vargas was a Spanish Lieutenant General who acted as captain general in Catalonia and Cuba. He was also Senator for life as Senator, representing Santander Province.

Throughout his military career, he participated in the First Carlist War on the Liberal allegiance, the Hispano-Moroccan War with Leopoldo O'Donnell, the Uprising of the San Gil barracks, and the Spanish Glorious Revolution which began the Sexenio Democrático. He served the Spanish Monarchy in the reigns of Isabella II and Alfonso XII as well as the First Spanish Republic.

He was Minister of War during the government of Antonio Cánovas del Castillo, under the reign of Alfonso XII. In addition, he was a member of the Conservative Party.

== Biography ==
=== Early years ===
Francisco de Ceballos y Vargas was born on October 9, 1814, in the Cantabrian municipality of Torrelavega. (Note: Torrelavega was not a city until María Cristina de Habsburgo-Lorena granted it this title on January 29, 1895.) He was the son of Juan Pablo de Ceballos Prieto who was a lawyer for the Council of Castile, and his wife Basilisa Vicenta María Díaz de Vargas Gutiérrez.

Coming from a family with a tradition in law, from a very young age he showed interest in starting a military career. At the age of 19, on July 11, 1833, he entered the Guardia de Corps of Fernando VII although shortly after, on September 29, 1833, Fernando died and on October 6, General Santos Ladrón de Cegama proclaimed Carlos María Isidro de Borbón as King of Spain in the Riojan town of Tricio, the date on which he began the First Carlist War.

=== Participation in the First Carlist War ===
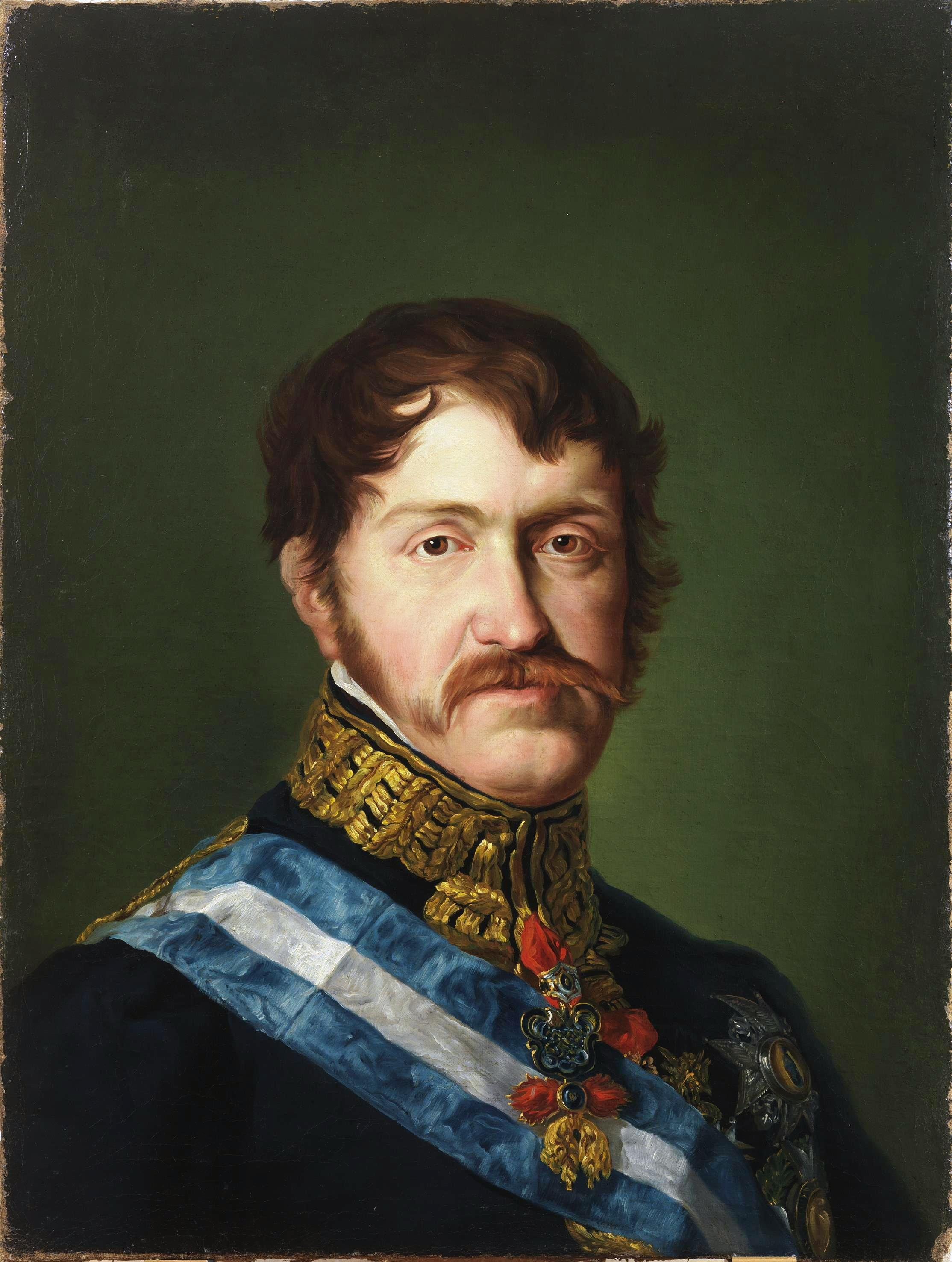
Infante Carlos María Isidro proclaimed himself king of Spain, which started the First Carlist War.

On the death of Fernando VII, Ceballos supported the cause of Isabel II and the regent María Cristina de Borbón against the brother of the late King Fernando, Carlos María Isidro. The Basque Country was one of the main scenes of the First Carlist War. Bilbao, a liberal and economic nucleus, was a main objective for the Carlists. General Tomás de Zumalacárregui tried to capture the town in 1835, but failed and was wounded in the vicinity of Begoña, four days after his death in Cegamanative. The following year, it resisted a second siege in which Baldomero Espartero defeated the Carlists in the Battle of Luchana. Ceballos participated in the northern front, playing a prominent role; In 1836, he took part of his first military action in the Army of Operations of the North under the command of the then Colonel, Ramón Castañeda, then continuing to the action of Castrejana, where he was wounded, and that of Archanda.

In 1838 he was present in the actions of Gandesa, Daroca and Morella; in 1843 at the siege of Zaragoza, after the siege, he participated in the fights of the highlands of Durango, the siege of Morella, Cuitorres, and Torre Miró. At the end of the war, Ceballos had been promoted to lieutenant colonel and had received the 1st Class Cross of the Laureate Cross of Saint Ferdinand on August 17, 1838, for the assault on Torre Miró and was Captain of the Laredo Provincial Regiment No. 19.

=== Deputy Governor of Cienfuegos and Santa Clara ===
On March 21, 1845, he embarked at the port of Santander bound for the island of Cuba where, at his own request, he joined the military forces stationed there. In Cuba he held different positions, both military and political, holding the positions of deputy governor of Cienfuegos and deputy governor of Santa Clara. During his stay on the Caribbean island, he reorganized the public administration and devoted great attention to public charity: the Hospital de la Caridad de Cienfuegos was due to his initiative.

In Cuba, he carried out a remarkable number of actions favorable to the interests of the crown, among which his victory against the secessionist attempt of General Narciso López stood out, he also saved the British ship Winlon from its wreck, which earned him the Great Medal of British gold.

=== Military and political career in Spain and Captain General of Cuba ===
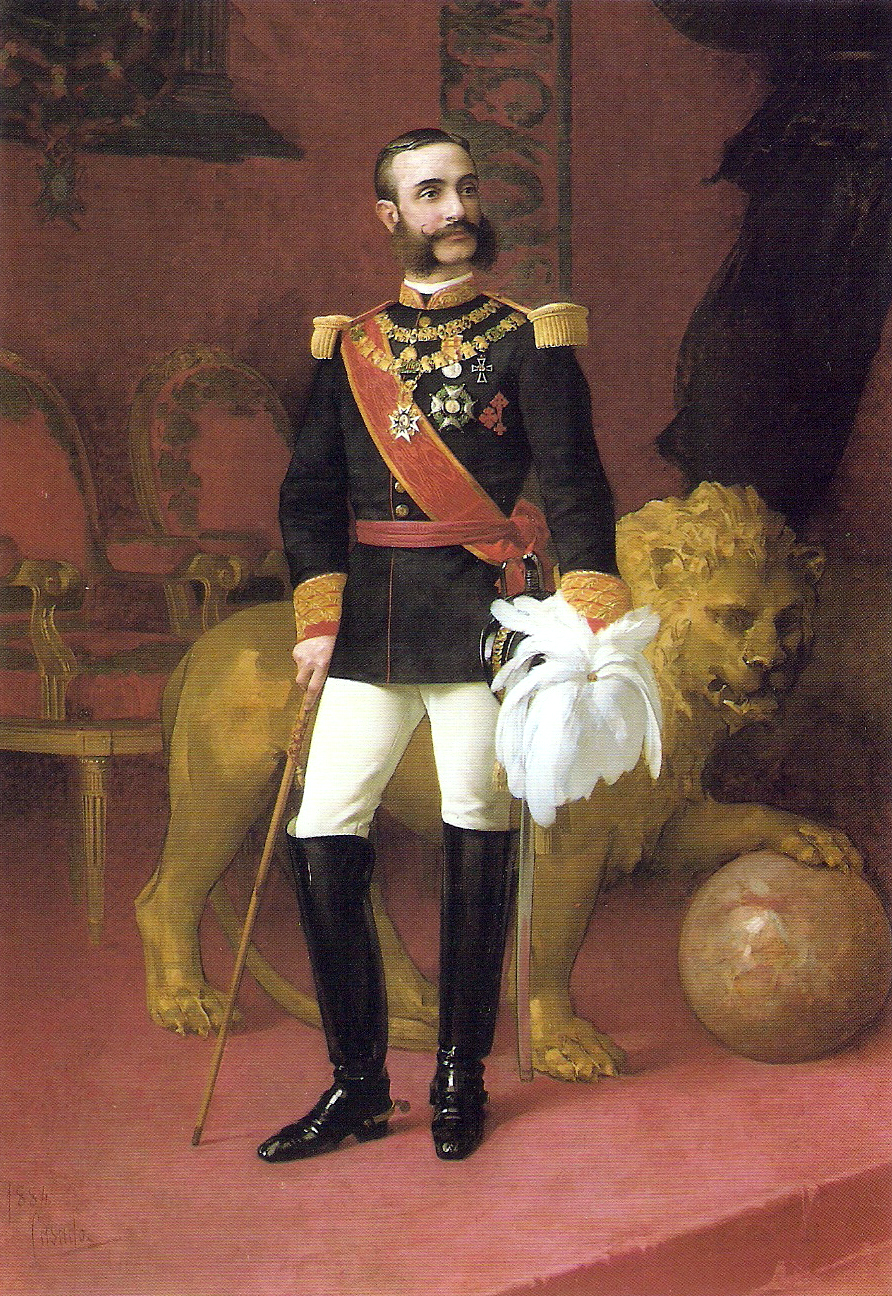
His Majesty Alfonso XII granted him the title of Marquis of Torrelavega.

Upon his return to Spain in 1859, with the rank of Colonel, he was appointed Field Assistant to the Captain General of the Army of Africa, Leopoldo O'Donnell, taking part in the Hispano-Moroccan War and participating in the actions of the Castillejos, the Plains of Tetouan, the Valley of Samsa and in the Battle of Wad-Ras; Ceballos ended the contest with the rank of Brigadier General.

On July 22, 1866, he intervened in the San Gil Barracks Uprising, a mutiny against Queen Isabella II that took place in Madrid under the auspices of the Progressive Party and the Democratic Party with the intention of overthrowing the monarchy. Ceballos contributed from the first moments in quelling the rebellion, losing his horse during the action and receiving several bullets. At the end of the uprising, the Queen promoted him to the rank of Field Marshal. During the Glorious Revolution, he put down the republican uprising in Andalusia, which led to him being awarded the Great Red Cross of Military Merit.

On February 11, 1873, the First Spanish Republic was established and the President of the Government, Nicolás Salmerón, appointed him Colonel General First Chief of the 1st Distinguished Battalion of Chiefs and Officers that created the republican government for the reorganization of the army. In 1872 he was again assigned to the island of Cuba; being named Captain General of Cuba on July 11, 1872, a position he held until 18 April 1873.

Back in Spain, he was assigned to the site of the Canton of Cartagena, which maintained its independence from the Spanish unitary Republic for six months between 1873 and 1874, during the so-called Cantonal Revolution. On September 8, 1873, he was appointed lieutenant general for war merits, having served the army for 49 years, 7 months and 29 days. On December 21, 1875, he replaced Joaquín Jovellar as Minister of War, a position he held until March 7, 1879. One of his most important acts at that time was his signature as Minister of War in the Constitution of 1876.

In March 1876 he accompanied Alfonso XII to visit the hospitals that had been established in Santander to care for the wounded in the civil war and on March 15 they went to Torrelavega so that the King could get to know the town and was Senator for life of the Senate of Spain, representing Santander. Half a year later, on October 24, 1876, he was granted the title of Marquis of Torrelavega. Among other services, Ceballos performed the function of Chief of the King's Military Quarter. He felt a special predilection for the town of Cohicillos where his parents were from and the Romanesque temple of Santa María de Yermo which, being practically destroyed, restored it at their own expense.

After his death on March 9, 1883, at the age of 68, in Madrid, he was succeeded as marquis by his son from his second marriage, Pablo de Ceballos y Avilés, married to Joaquina López-Doriga y López-Dóriga; who reached the rank of Lieutenant of Cavalry.

== Awards ==
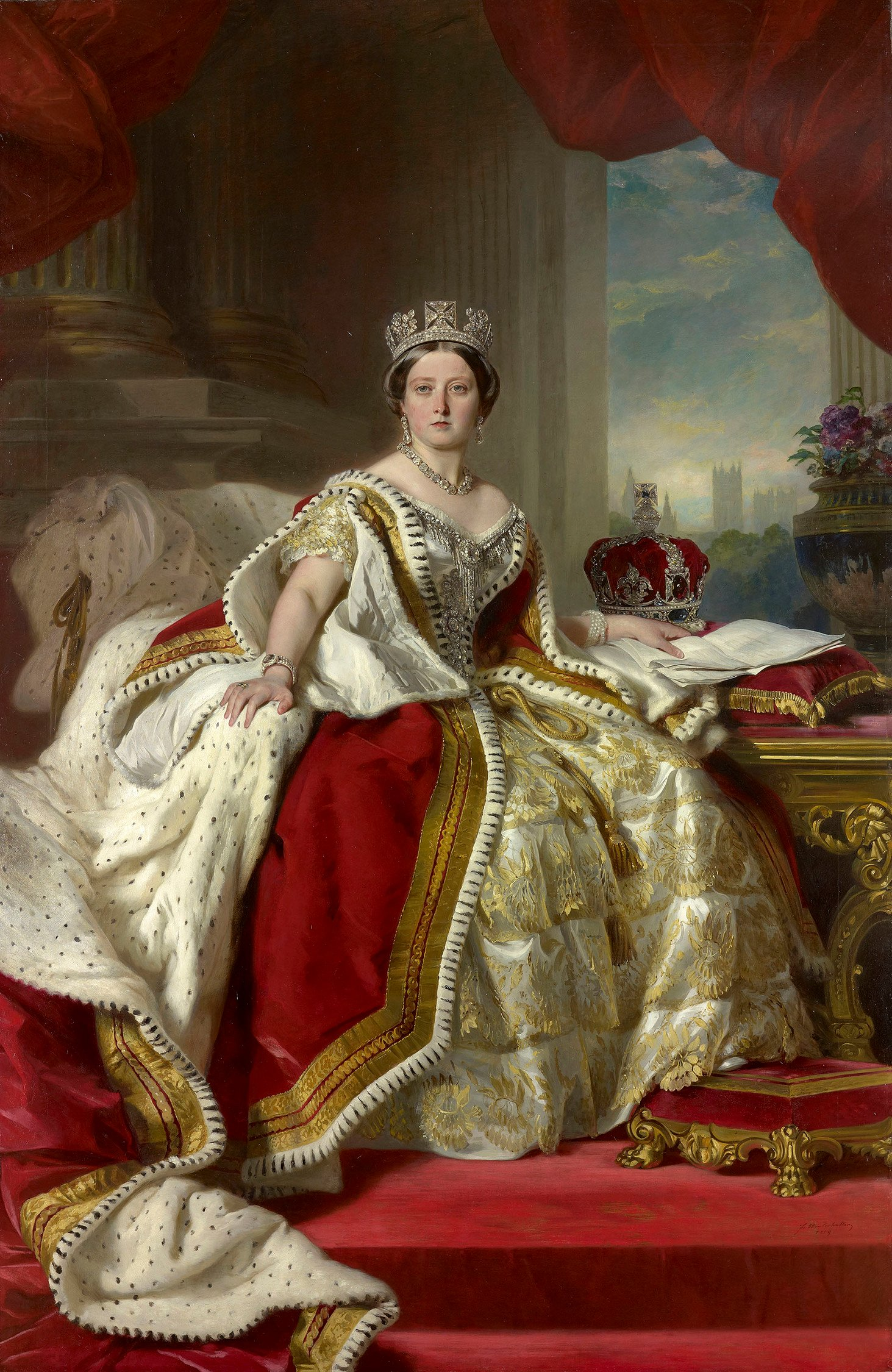
In 1858, Queen Victoria I of the United Kingdom awarded him the Great Gold Medal of Great Britain for saving the British ship Winlon from the wreck.

- Laureate Cross of Saint Ferdinand, 1st Class (1838)
- Order of Isabella the Catholic, Cross (1840)
- Laureate Cross of Saint Ferdinand, 1st Class (1844)
- Royal and Military Order of Saint Hermenegild, Cross (1854)
- Cross of Military Merit (1855)
- Order of Charles III, Commander (1864)
- Order of Isabella the Catholic, Grand Cross (1865)
- Royal and Military Order of Saint Hermenegild, Grand Cross (1866)
- Cross of Military Merit, Grand Cross with red insignia (1869)

=== Foreign awards ===
- Italy: Order of Saints Maurice and Lazarus, Knight of the Grand Cross
- Tunis: Grand Cross of Nirhan Yfhijar
- United Kingdom: Great Gold Medal of Great Britain (1858)
