= Battle of Wad Ras =

Last battle of the Hispano–Moroccan War

Battle of Wad-Ras
- Part of Hispano–Moroccan War (1859–1860)
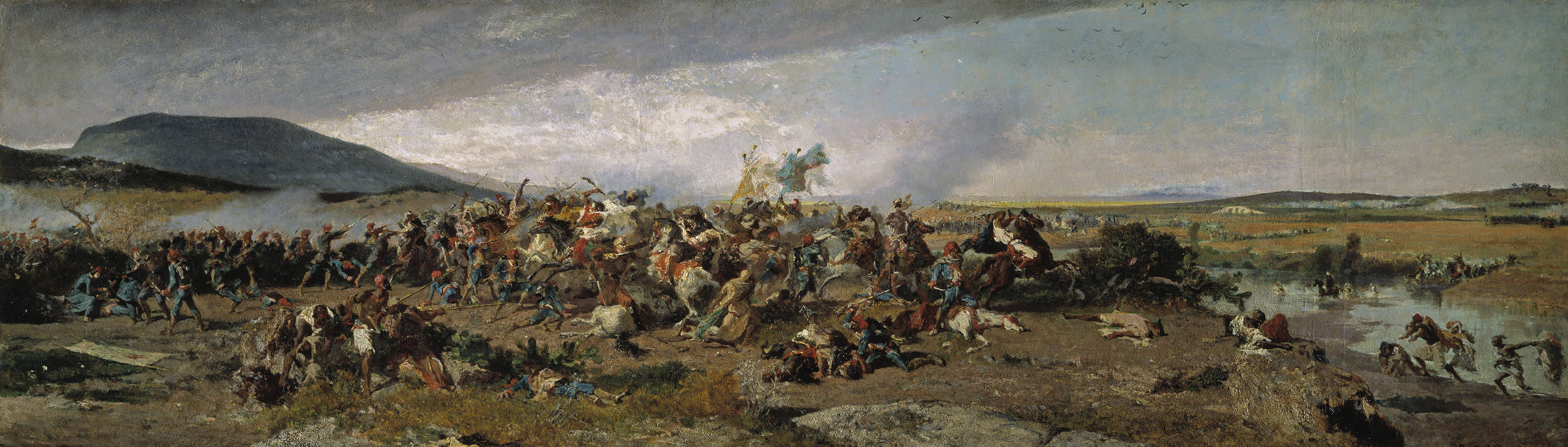
- Painting by Mariano Fortuny (c. 1862–1863)
Date	March 23, 1860
Location	Valley of Wad-Ras, Morocco
Result	Spanish victory; Treaty of Wad Ras

Belligerents
Spain	Morocco

Commanders and leaders
Leopoldo O'Donnell	Mawlay Abbas

Strength
37,000	Around 40,000

Casualties and losses
300 killed and 400 wounded	More than 1,000 killed and wounded

The Battle of Wad-Ras took place on March 23, 1860 within the Hispano-Moroccan War (1859-1860) that, together with the Battle of Castillejos and Tétouan, completed Spain's action in North Africa to reduce the hostilities of the Riffian bands against Ceuta.

== Battle ==
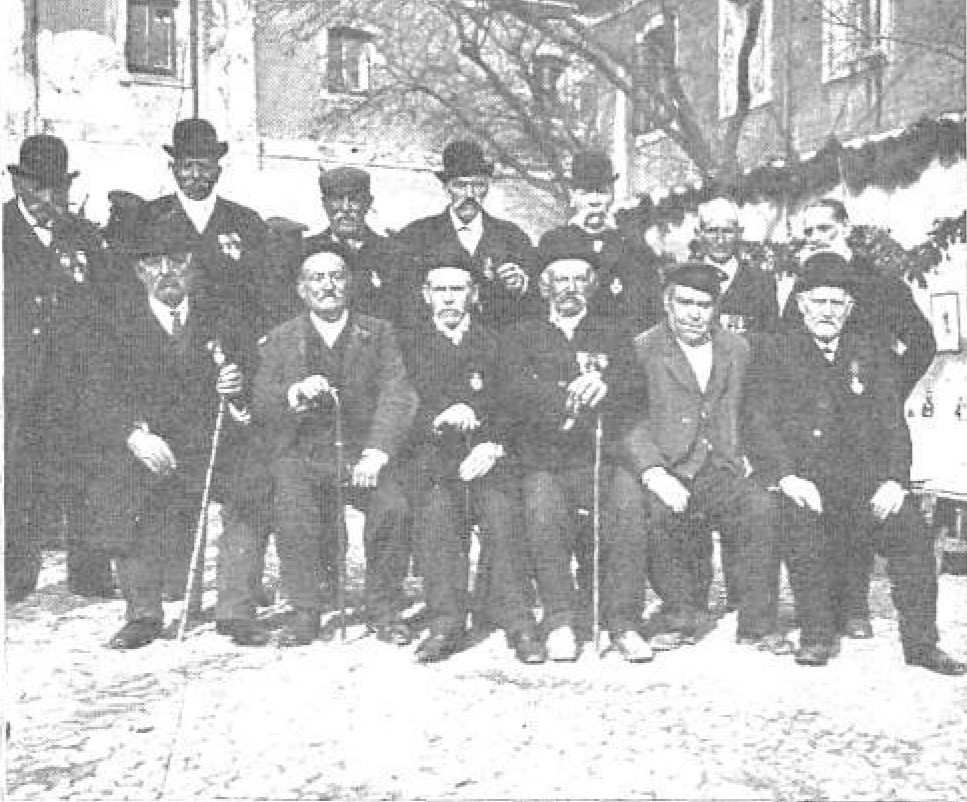
Group of Spanish veterans of Wad-Ras at a tribute held in 1909, commemorating the 49th anniversary of the battle, at the Los Docks barrack in Madrid.

After conquering the city of Tetouan in February 1860, the Spanish expeditionary force, led by General Leopoldo O'Donnell (President of the Government and Minister of War), decided to advance towards Tangier. On March 23, the troops led by Generals Rafaél de Echagüe y Bermingham, Antonio Ros de Olano and Juan Prim defeated the Moroccan forces in the valley of Wad-Ras. The military defeat dispersed the irregular Moroccan forces and led to the immediate request for talks to arrange peace.

The peace was signed in Tetouan on April 26, 1860 by the Treaty of Wad-Ras between Spain and Morocco, represented by O'Donnell and Muley el-Abbás (brother of the Sultan). Through this treaty, Spain enlarged the limits of Ceuta and annexed Sidi Ifni.

== Aftermath ==
Following the successive defeats suffered by Morocco in its confrontations against Spanish troops and in particular after the Battle of Wad Ras, Sultan Muhammad IV of Morocco was forced to ask for peace from Queen Isabella II of Spain through the Treaty of Wad Ras, signed in Tetouan on 26 April 1860.

The Museo del Prado has an oil painting on cardboard measuring 54 by 182 cm, depicting the battle of Wad-Ras, made by Mariano Fortuny, who was commissioned by the Provincial Council of Barcelona to immortalize for posterity the feat of the Spanish army, made up in part of the sons of Barcelona. The National Art Museum of Catalonia houses the enormous painting La batalla de Tetuán measuring 300 by 972 cm.

The lions of the Congress of Deputies, made of bronze by the Spanish sculptor Ponciano Ponzano, were molded with the cannons captured from the Moroccans in that battle.

== Bibliography ==
- Alcalá Giménez-da Costa, César (2005). La Campaña de Marruecos (1859-1860). Alcañiz y Fresnos, S.A. ISBN 84-96016-55-2.
- de Alarcón, Pedro Antonio (1917). Diario de un testigo de la Guerra de África. Vol. 1. Madrid: Est. Tip. Sucesores de Rivadeneyra.
- Leo (1896). The History and Description of Africa and of the Notable Things Therein Contained. Hakluyt Soc.
- Allard, Elisabeth Bolorinos (2021). Spanish National Identity, Colonial Power, and the Portrayal of Muslims and Jews During the Rif War (1909-27). Boydell & Brewer. ISBN 978-1-85566-345-9.
- Fieldhouse, David Kenneth (1984). Economics and Empire, 1830-1914. Macmillan. ISBN 978-0-333-36827-5.
- Calderwood, Eric (9 April 2018). Colonial al-Andalus: Spain and the Making of Modern Moroccan Culture. Harvard University Press. ISBN 978-0-674-98579-7.
- Rubio, Francisco Asensio (24 April 2014). Hombres ilustres de Almagro (in Spanish). Punto Rojo Libros. ISBN 978-1-62934-733-2.
- de Dalmau, Ramón (1887). Tratado y notas de derecho internacional público (in Spanish). M. Murillo.
- Romani, Carlos Fernández de Casadevante (30 September 2022). Legal Implications of Territorial Secession in Spain. Springer. ISBN 978-3-031-04609-4.
- Epstein, M. (27 December 2016). The Statesman's Year-Book: Statistical and Historical Annual of the States of the World for the Year 1947. Springer. ISBN 978-0-230-27076-3.
- Estrada, Francisco López (1997). Historia de España (in Spanish). Vol. 10. Espasa-Calpe. ISBN 978-84-239-8948-5.
- Hopkins, Claudia (8 August 2024). Art and Identity in Spain, 1833–1956: The Orient within. Bloomsbury. ISBN 978-1-350-42854-6.
- de Madrazo y Kuntz, Federico (1994). Federico de Madrazo (1815-1894): Museo Romántico, 5 de octubre - 13 de noviembre de 1994 (in Spanish). Amigos del Museo Romántico. ISBN 978-84-88712-02-8.
- Baumert, Thomas; Márquez, Carmen Paradinas; Padilla, Andrés Sánchez (10 September 2024). A History of Spanish Institutions. ESIC Editorial. ISBN 978-84-1192-076-6.
