= Battle of Sierra Bullones =

Battle of the Hispano–Moroccan War

- Part of Hispano–Moroccan War (1859–1860)
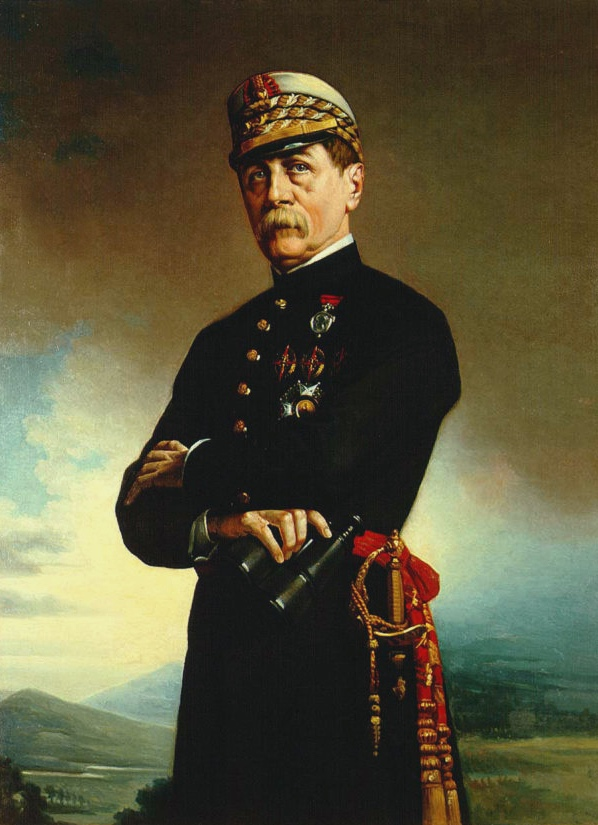
- Portrait of the Captain General of the Army Juan Zavala de la Puente
Date	December 9, 1859
Location	Belyounech, Morocco
Result	Spanish victory

Belligerents
Spain	Morocco

Commanders and leaders
Juan de Zavala y de la Puente	Abbas bin Abd al-Rahman

Casualties and losses
400 killed or wounded	500 killed, 1,500 wounded

The Battle of Sierra de Bullones was the first big battle between Spain and Morocco during the Hispano-Moroccan War.

== Battle ==
The battle was fought on December 9, 1859 when the Moroccan forces of Abbas bin Abd al-Rahman attacked the Spanish positions. The general Juan Zavala de la Puente, commander of the 2th Spanish division, went to the aid of the Spanish positions and managed to repel the attackers.

== Aftermath ==
The Moroccan army fled in the direction of Castillejos, where a battle would also take place. His distinguished action earned him the title of marquis of Sierra Bullones. Also notable was the Barcelona-born soldier Enrique Bargés Pombo, who received the 1st class Laureate Cross of San Fernando.

== Bibliography ==
- Butler Clarke, Henry (2013). Modern Spain 1815-1898. Cambridge University Press. ISBN 9781107630062.
- Ibo Alfaro, Manuel (1860). La Corona de laurel.
- Gómez Rodríguez, L. (2013). "La Sanidad Militar en la Guerra de África (1859-1860)". Sanidad Militar. 69 (2). Madrid: 127–133. doi:10.4321/S1887-85712013000200012. ISSN 1887-8571.
- García Ruiz, Eugenio (1878). Historias, 2 (in Spanish). imp. de El Pueblo Español.
- Marín i Garcia, Josep Lluís (2011). Sàtira i falles (in Catalan). Universitat de València. ISBN 9788437082646.
- Kersten, P. (1860). Journal historique et litteraire (in French). Comptoir universel dʹimprimerie et de librairie.
