= Federico Ochando =

Spanish general and politician

Federico Rodrigo Martín Sánchez Ochando y Chumillas
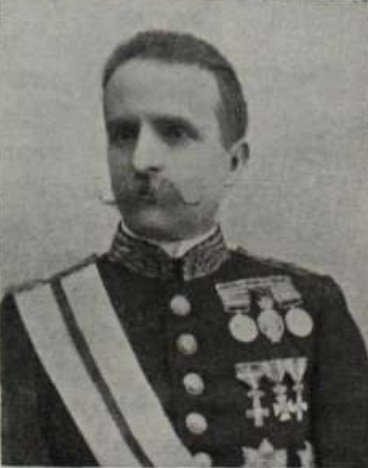
- Ochando in 1899

Vice President of the Senate of Spain
- In office 1901–1902
- In office 1905–1907
- In office 1910–1911

Senator for life
- In office 1905–1923

Senator of Albacete
- In office 1898–1902
- In office 1905–1907

Senator of La Habana
- In office 1896–1898

110th Governor-General of the Philippines
- In office 1 March 1893 – 4 May 1893
- Preceded by: Eulogio Despujol y Dusay
- Succeeded by: Ramón Blanco, 1st Marquis of Peña Plata

Deputy of Casas-Ibáñez
- In office 1879–1884
- In office 1891–1892
- In office 1903–1905

Deputy of Alcaraz
- In office 1893–1896
- In office 1886–1890

Personal details
- Born: 14 March 1848 Fuentealbilla, Albacete, Spain
- Died: 2 February 1929 (aged 80) Madrid, Spain
- Party: Liberal Party
- Spouse: Maria Matilda Valera y Canada
- Children: Roman Angel Emeterio Sanchez Ochando y Chumillas
- Education: Academia de Estado Mayor
- Awards: Distinciones de la Cruz Roja Española (Distinguished Spanish Red Cross); Gran Cruz Roja al Merito Militar (Grand Red Cross of Military Merit); Gran Cruz de Isabel la Catolica (Order of Isabella the Catholic); Gran Cruz de San Hermenegildo (Grand Cross of Saint Hermenegild); Gran Cruz de San Benito de Avis (Grand Cross of Saint Benedict of Aviz)

Military service
- Allegiance: Spain
- Branch/service: Spanish Army
- Rank: Lieutenant general
- Battles/wars: Ten Years' War; Third Carlist War; Cuban War of Independence

Federico Rodrigo Martín Sánchez Ochando y Chumillas (14 March 1848 – 2 February 1929) was a Spanish general and politician who served as the 110th Governor-General of the Philippines, Deputy and Senator of Albacete, and Vice President of the Senate of Spain. Ochando was an illustrious and decorated general with a prolific career in politics. As a deputy and a senator, infrastructure projects and improvement of the Spanish military were among his key programs.

== Early life and career ==
Federico Ochando was born of Andres Maria Sanchez Ochando and Ana Catalina Chumillas on 14 March 1848 in Fuentealbilla, Albacete, Spain. His brother, Andres Ochando y Chumillas, was a lawyer and would serve as Deputy of Casas-Ibáñez from 1893 to 1896. He married Maria Matilda Valera y Canada and they had a son, Roman Angel Emeterio Sanchez Ochando y Chumillas, who was born in 1867. His son would also serve as Deputy of Casas-Ibáñez from 1919 to 1920. In 1864, Ochando entered the Academia de Estado Mayor and was promoted as alférez in 1867. Two years later, he had the rank of staff lieutenant. He first saw action during the Third Carlist War, when he participated in military campaigns against Carlists in Barcelona, Sant Celoni, and Valencia. He then fought opponents of the Spanish Restoration, which placed Alfonso XII of Spain as king. His participation in the March to Cuba during the Ten Years' War earned him the rank of brigadier general in 1878.

== Deputy and Governor ==
In 1879, he was elected as Deputy of Casas-Ibáñez with 66% of the vote. In 1881, he was elected as deputy in the same district with 69% of the vote, performing better than his first election. Ochando would be one of the most notable personalities from the town of Casas-Ibáñez, who was also a leader of the Liberal Party during his political career. In 1886, he would serve as Deputy of Alcaraz, a town in the same province as Casas-Ibáñez. He was elected in the district with 100% of the vote. He was elected for the third time as Deputy of Casas-Ibáñez in 1891, but there was no record for his vote percentage. In 1893, he was elected for the second time as Deputy of Alcaraz, again with 100% of the vote. However, prior to taking his seat as deputy, he was appointed as the 110th Governor-General of the Philippines, replacing Eulogio Despujol y Dusay on 1 March 1893. The dismissal of Despujol was attributed to the new liberal government, with Práxedes Mateo Sagasta as Prime Minister of Spain. One of the notable acts of Ochando was the change of José Rizal's guard. On 16 May 1893, Ricardo Carnicero was replaced by Juan Sitges as district governor. There were rumors that Ochando gave orders to Sitges for tightening Rizal's security and to shoot the prisoner if he escaped. Soon enough, Ramón Blanco, 1st Marquess of Peña Plata assumed office as the new Governor-General of the Philippines in the same year.

== Senator ==
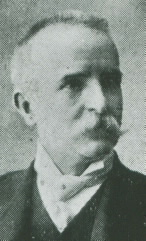
Ochando as senator in 1896.

After his return to Spain due to illness, he was appointed military governor of Madrid in 1894 and promoted to the rank of lieutenant general in 1895. The following year, he arrived in Cuba as Valeriano Weyler's chief of staff and participated in the Spanish campaign during the Cuban War of Independence. In the same year, he was elected Senator of La Habana. In 1897, he returned to Spain and was appointed Captain General of Aragon. In 1898, he was appointed Captain General of Andalusia. In the same year, he was elected as Senator of Albacete, a position he would serve in until 1902. While serving as senator, he was appointed as Inspector General of the Guardia Civil in 1901. In 1903, he was elected for the fourth time as Deputy of Casas-Ibáñez with 85% of the vote. In the same year, he was appointed Inspector General of the Carabineros. The following year, he was appointed Captain General of Old Castile. In 1905, he was back in the Senate. However, he was not only Senator of Albacete, he was made senator for life (senador vitalicio) by royal decree in 1906. Among his activities as senator include requesting ratings for Ministers of the Crown, and propose increasing the benefits for members of the armed forces. He requested the Spanish Council of State to report on the conflict between the Ministry of Justice and Ministry of War concerning the salary of a regional officer. He proposed to provide a pension for General Diego Ollero y Carmona's widow, Teresa Morales Guerrero Estrella, and General Francisco Rizzo y Ramirez's widow, Dolores Goñi y Zangroniz. He proposed the inclusion of the Bonete Road expansion in the general road plan of Spain. The Bonete Road runs from Albacete to Ayora. Ochando was known for his various infrastructure projects in his district during his service as deputy and senator. Another major project undertaken upon Ochando's initiative was the Baeza-Utiel Line, also known as the Baeza-Albacete Line. Planning for the 366-kilometer long railway connecting Baeza and Utiel began in 1926. He requested the enforcement of the law concerning civilian destination of licensed members of the armed forces. Lastly, he requested financial assistance for the youth to enter military academies. During his entire career in the Senate, he served thrice as Vice President of the Senate of Spain (1901–1902, 1905–1907, 1910–1911). Meanwhile, from 1907 to 1910, he served as Director-general of the Carabineros, as well as Sub-minister (Undersecretary) of War.

== Death ==
He died on 2 February 1929 in Madrid, Spain. Two days later, the President of the Spanish Senate (Álvaro de Figueroa y Torres) gave a memorial to the late senator. A road, Calle Federico Ochando, was named after him.

=== Ochando's ancestry ===
Federico Ochando's ancestry

4. Pedro Sanchez Ochando
2. Andres Maria Sanchez Ochando
5. Ysabel Trinidad Ponce De Leon
1. Federico Ochando
6. Fernando Antonio Chumillas
3. Ana Catalina Chumillas
7. Josefa Maria Pardo

Preceded by Eulogio Despujol y Dusay	Governor General of the Philippines; 1893	Succeeded by Ramón Blanco, 1st Marquess of Peña Plata
