= Dionisio Fierros =

Spanish painter

Dionisio Fierros Álvarez
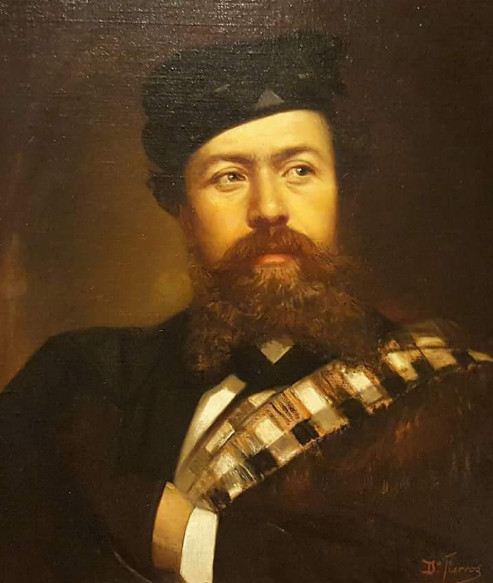
- Self-portrait (1866)
- Born: 5 May 1827; Ballota, Spain
- Died: 24 June 1894 (aged 67); Madrid, Spain
- Occupation: Painter

Signature
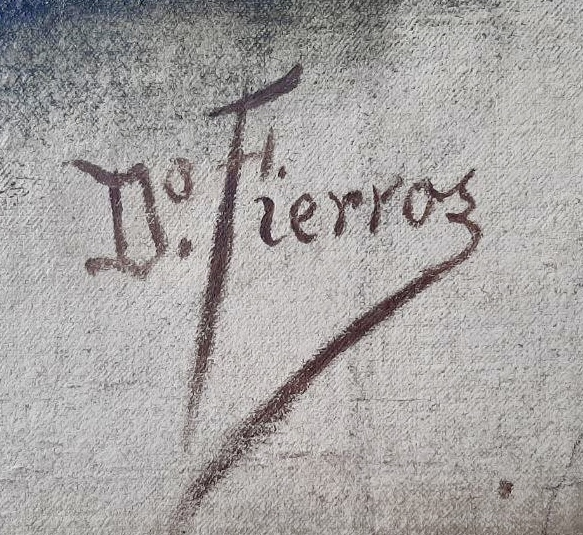

Dionisio Fierros Álvarez (5 May 1827 – 24 June 1894) was a Spanish painter in the Romantic style who specialized in historical and costumbrista scenes. For many years, he was a member of the Real Academia de Bellas Artes de San Fernando.

== Biography ==
He was born in Ballota, but left his home town at the age of fourteen for Madrid, where he found a position as an apprentice to a tailor. Later, it is believed, he became a servant for the Marqués de San Adrián, who had an extensive art collection. When the Marqués discovered him copying some of the paintings, he was impressed and introduced Fierros to José de Madrazo. This may be apocryphal, but he did study with the Madrazos and make copies at the Museo del Prado. He may also have studied in Paris and Italy.

He made his exhibition début in 1858, with five portraits and three miscellaneous scenes, shown in Santiago de Compostela, where he was living at the time. At the National Exhibition of Fine Arts in 1860, he won a prize for his painting of a pilgrimage to Santiago and, in 1862, came in at second place for his depiction of people leaving a mass there. Over the next few years, he participated in several international exhibitions; winning a first-class medal at the Centennial Exposition in Philadelphia.

During this time, he also created a mural of the "Ecstasy of Saint Teresa" for the monastery at El Escorial. In 1886, his painting of a scene from the life of King Henry III was purchased by the Ministry of Public Works. From 1885 to 1889, he lived in Galicia, painting portraits, landscapes and genre scenes on behalf of the "Real Sociedad Económica de Amigos de País de Santiago de Compostela".

Five years after returning to Madrid, he died unexpectedly while on his way to attend a bullfight. In 1966, a major retrospective was held at the Ateneo de Madrid and, in 2000, another major showing was presented in Vigo.

== Selected paintings ==
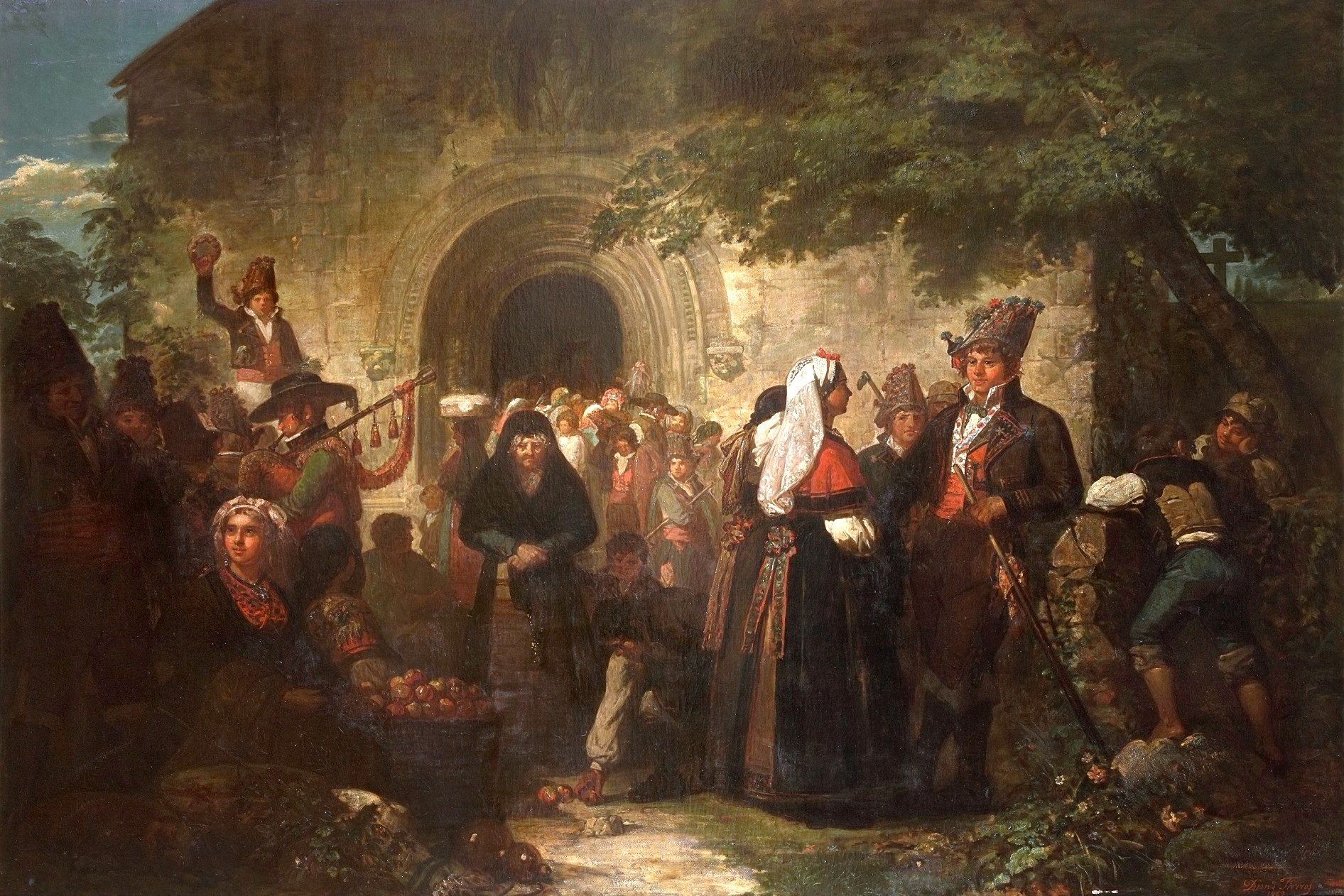
Leaving Mass in a village near Santiago

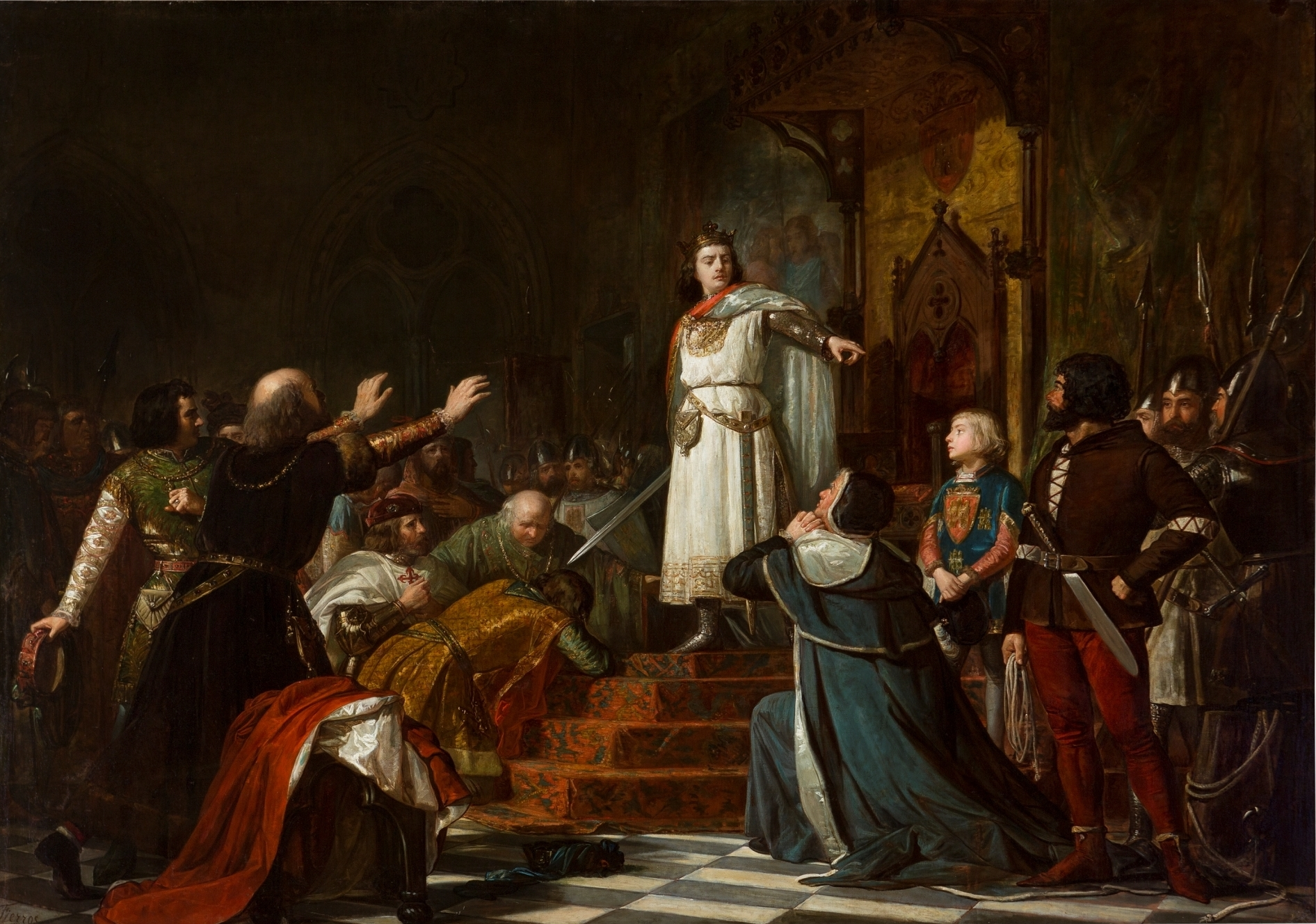
Henry III chastising his Noblemen

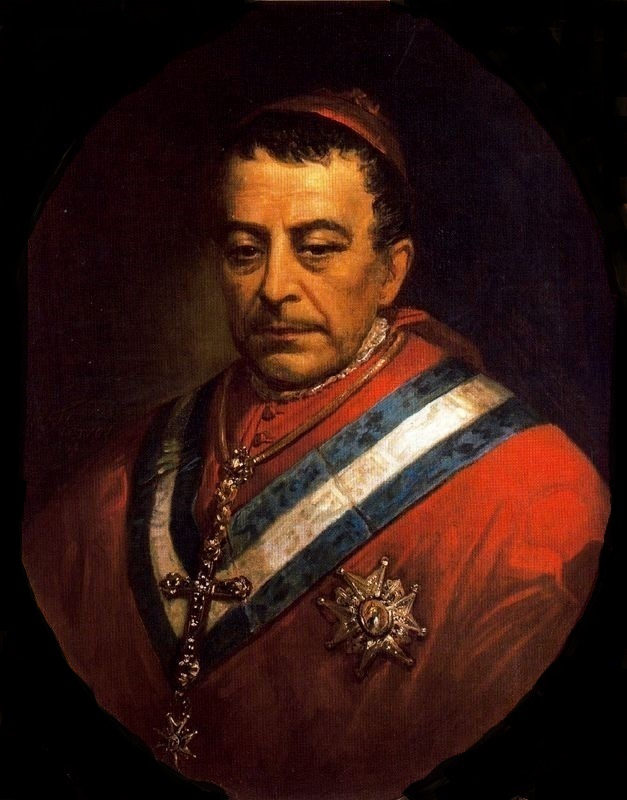
Cardinal
Miguel García Cuesta

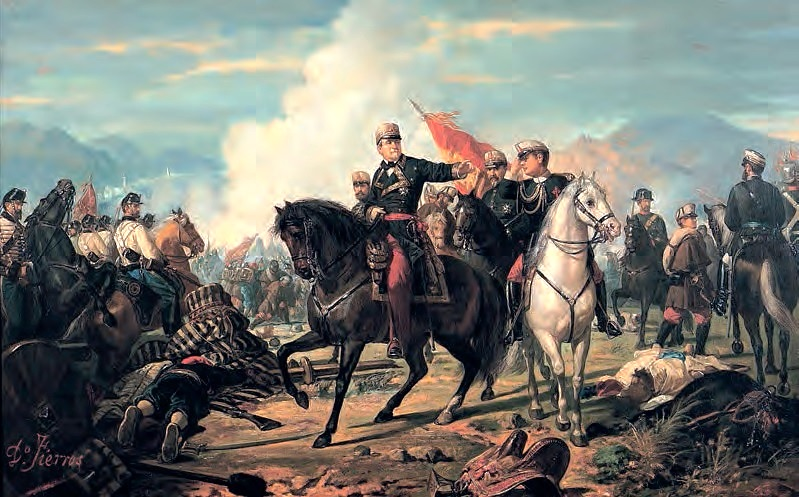
The Battle of Tetuán
