= Battle of Tétouan =

1860 battle of the Hispano–Moroccan War

- Part of the Hispano–Moroccan War (1859–1860)
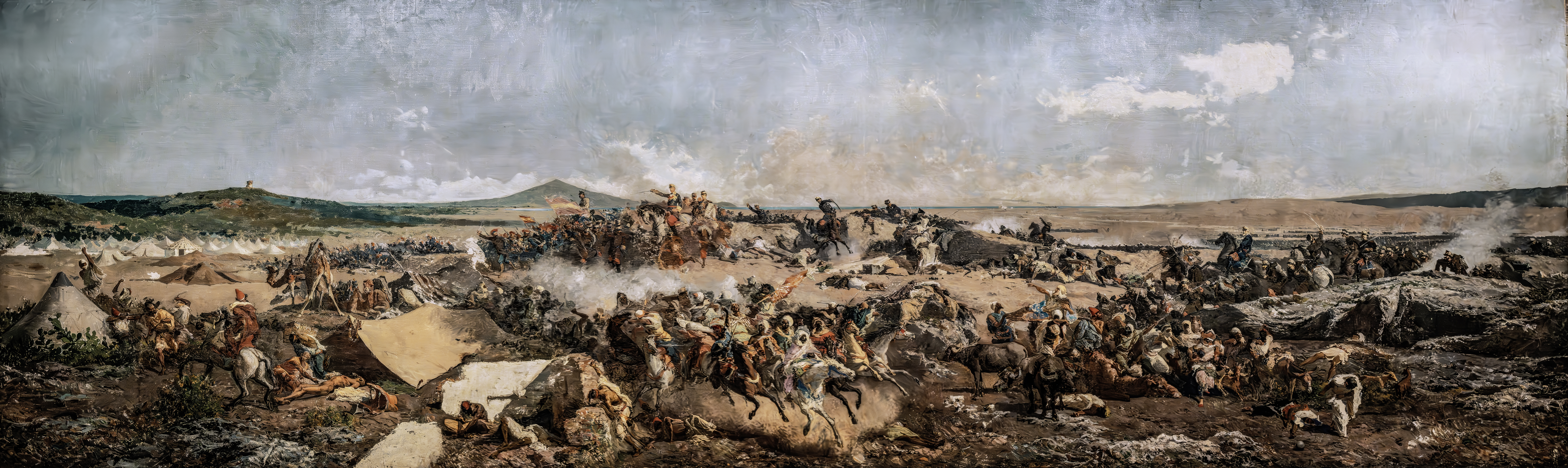
- The Battle of Tétouan; Marià Fortuny, 1862–1864
Date	4 February 1860
Location	Tétouan, Morocco 35°34′26″N 5°19′50″W
Result	Spanish victory

Belligerents
Spain	Morocco

Commanders and leaders
(Spain) Leopoldo O'Donnell (Spain) Antonio Ros Olano	(Morocco) Muhammad IV (Morocco) Mawlay Abbas

Strength
25,000 men 65 pieces of artillery 41 ships	35,000
- Location within Morocco

The Battle of Tétouan (Arabic: معركة تطوان, Spanish: Batalla de Tetuán) was fought from 4 to 6 February 1860, near Tétouan, Morocco, between a Spanish Army sent to North Africa and the tribal levies which at the time made up the Moroccan Army. The battle was part of the Hispano–Moroccan War of 1859–1860.

== Background ==
The Spanish expeditionary force, which departed from Algeciras, was composed of 36,000 men, 65 pieces of artillery, and 41 ships, which included steamships, sailboats, and smaller vessels. General Leopoldo O'Donnell personally took charge of the expedition and divided these forces into three corps. These were commanded by General The 5th Marqués de Torreblanca, General Antonio Ros de Olano and General Ramón de Echagüe. Reserves were placed under the command of General The 1st Conde de Reus. Admiral Segundo Díaz Herrero commanded the fleet. The objective of the Spanish forces was to take Tétouan, which had served as a base for raids on Ceuta and Melilla.

Hostilities between Moroccan and Spanish troops began on 17 December 1859 when the column commanded by The Marqués de Torreblanca occupied the Battle of Sierra Bullones. On 19 December, Echagüe captured the Palacio del Serrallo. The Conde de Lucena commanded a force that landed at Ceuta on 21 December. By 25 December, the three columns had consolidated their positions and awaited orders to advance towards Tétouan.

== Battle ==
On 1 January 1860, the Spanish monarch, Queen Isabella II who was present in Tetouan, encouraged her troops with a clear message “let’s demonstrate who we are“. The Conde de Reus advanced towards the port of Guad al Gelu. The Marqués de Torreblanca’s column and the Royal Spanish Navy guarded his flank. Clashes continued until 31 January 1860, when a major Moroccan offensive was stopped. The Conde de Lucena began a march towards the objective of Tétouan, and was supported by forces composed of Catalan volunteers. Covering fire was provided by units commanded by General The Conde de Reus and General Ros de Olano. Spanish artillery inflicted heavy losses on the Moroccan ranks; the Moroccan forces that remained took refuge in Tétouan. The city fell on 6 February 1860. A week of further fighting followed before hostilities ceased.

== Aftermath ==
The capture of Tétouan prevented further attacks on Ceuta and Melilla by Moroccan forces. The Conde de Lucena returned with his troops to Spain; they camped at a spot north of Madrid while a triumphal entry into the capital was arranged. The camp, which acquired permanent structures as well as shops over time, became the Madrid neighbourhood known as Tetuán de las Victorias. In the aftermath of the battle, General Leopoldo O'Donnell, 1st Conde de Lucena, was elevated in the Spanish peerage to being The 1st Duque de Tetuán. He later served as President of the Council of Ministers (also known as the Prime Minister).

After the Mellah of Tetuan had been sacked and hundreds of Jews fled to Cádiz and Gibraltar for refuge, the Jews of Tetuan, who spoke Tetuani Ladino or Haketia, a variety of Old Castilian or Ibero-Romance spoken by Jews, welcomed the invading Spanish troops as liberators, and collaborated with the Spanish authorities as brokers and translators during the 27-month-long occupation of the city.

== Cultural references ==
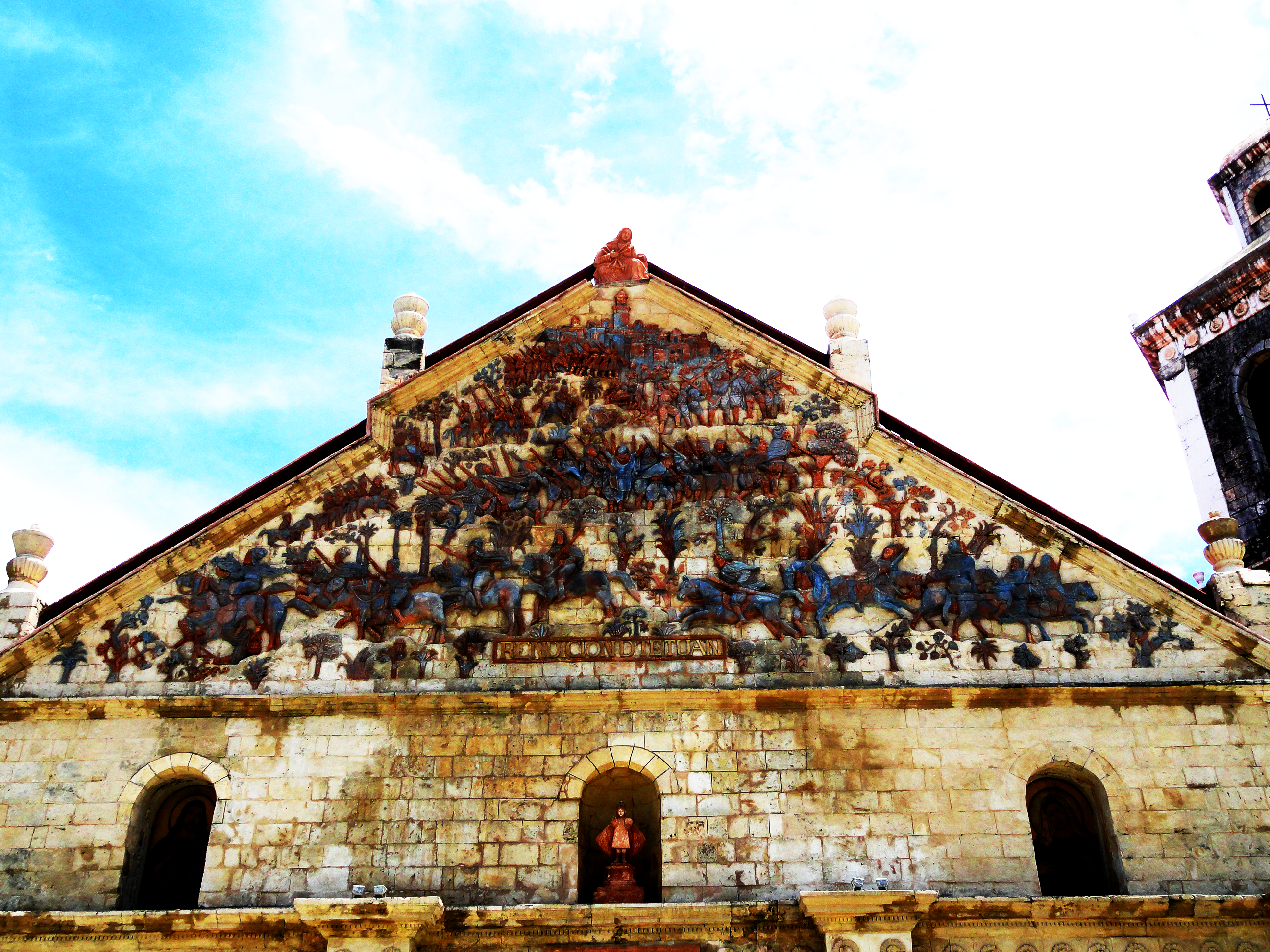
Rendition of the battle scene carved and painted on the pediment of the façade of San Joaquín Church, Iloilo, Philippines.

Salvador Dalí painted a version of Fortuny’s painting of the battle.

The Spanish victory was carved and painted on the pediment of the Church of San Joaquín, Iloilo, considered a militarist-themed church in the Philippines. It was declared a national historical site in 1974. It was built in 1859 and completed in 1869 by the Spanish friar Tomas Santaren of the Augustinian Order.

The Spanish Navy armoured frigate Tetuán, in service from 1866 to 1873, was named for the Battle of Tétouan.

== Gallery ==
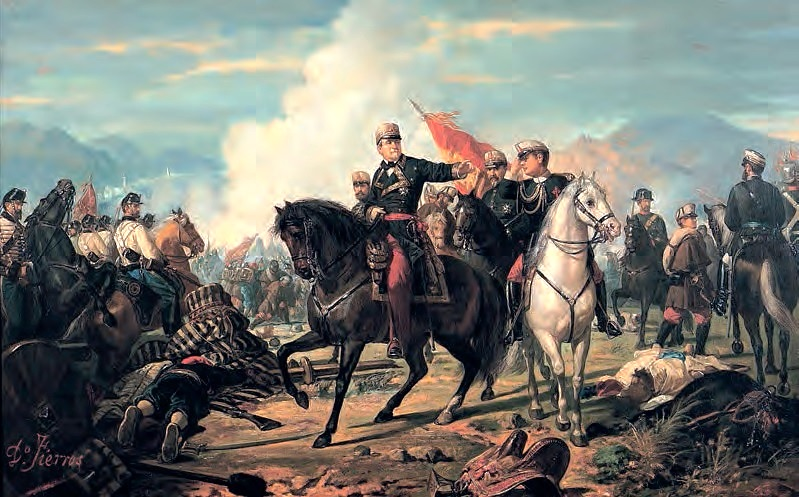
The Battle of Tetuán, by Dionisio Fierros (1894, private collection).

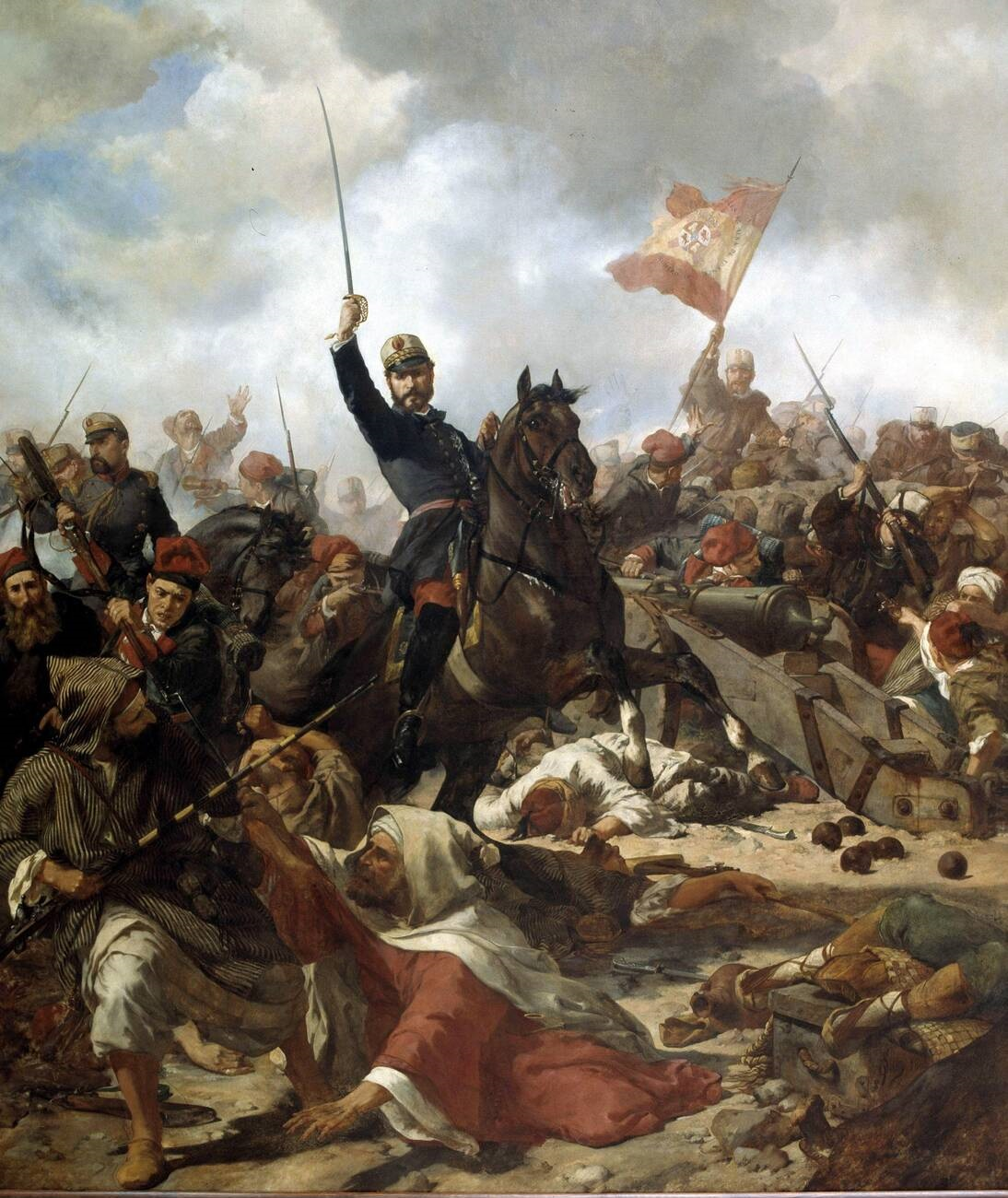
General The 1st Count of Reus at the Battle of Tetuán. The title of the painting is "General Prim in the War of Africa" (in Catalan: El General Prim a la guerra d'Àfrica), by Francisco Sans Cabot (1865, formerly at the Barcelona Military Museum, now closed)
