= The Battle of Tétouan (Fortuny) =

Painting by Marià Fortuny

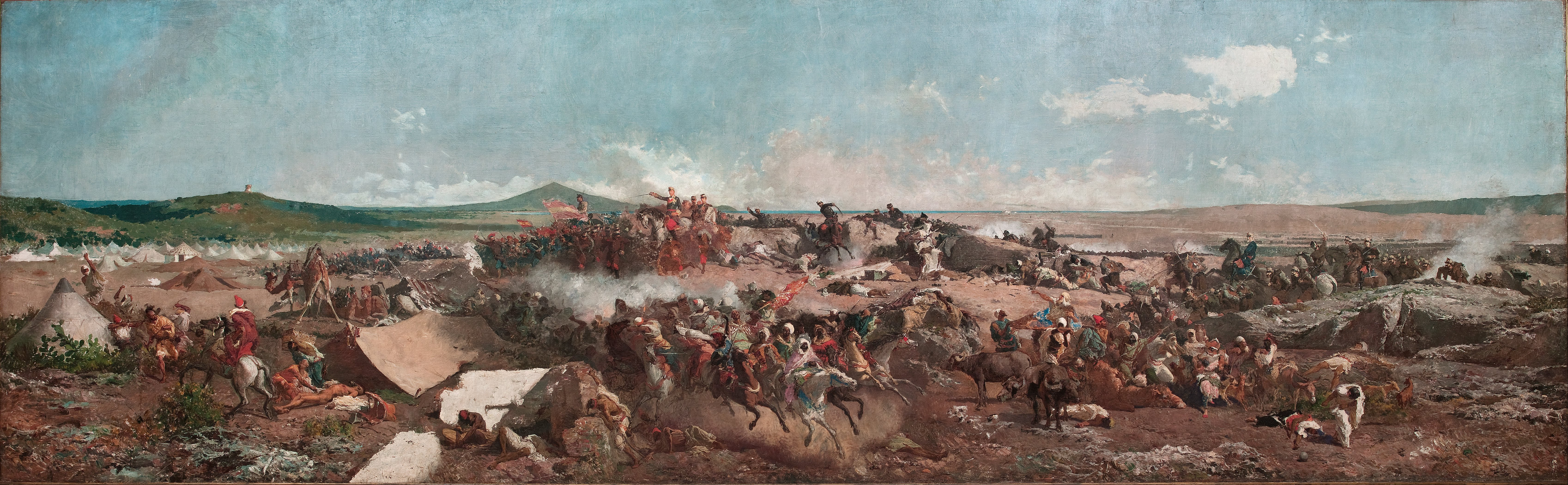
- Artist: Mariano Fortuny
- Year: 1862–1864
- Medium: Oil on canvas
- Dimensions: 972 cm × 300 cm (383 in × 120 in)
- Location: Museu Nacional d'Art de Catalunya, Barcelona

The Battle of Tétouan is an 1862–1864 painting by the Spanish-Catalan painter Mariano Fortuny portraying the eponymous 1860 Battle of Tétouan where the Spanish Army defeated the Moroccan Army (then made up of tribal levies) to take the port city of Tétouan.

Fortuny was commissioned by the Spanish government to depict the Spanish-Moroccan War, which lasted from 1859 to 1860. In 1860, he traveled to the front with the Spanish army. The sketches he made during that journey later served as the basis for this painting, which was never fully completed.

In 1962 Salvador Dalí did his own painting named The Battle of Tétouan after this work.

The painting is in the Museu Nacional d'Art de Catalunya, in Barcelona.

== Gallery ==
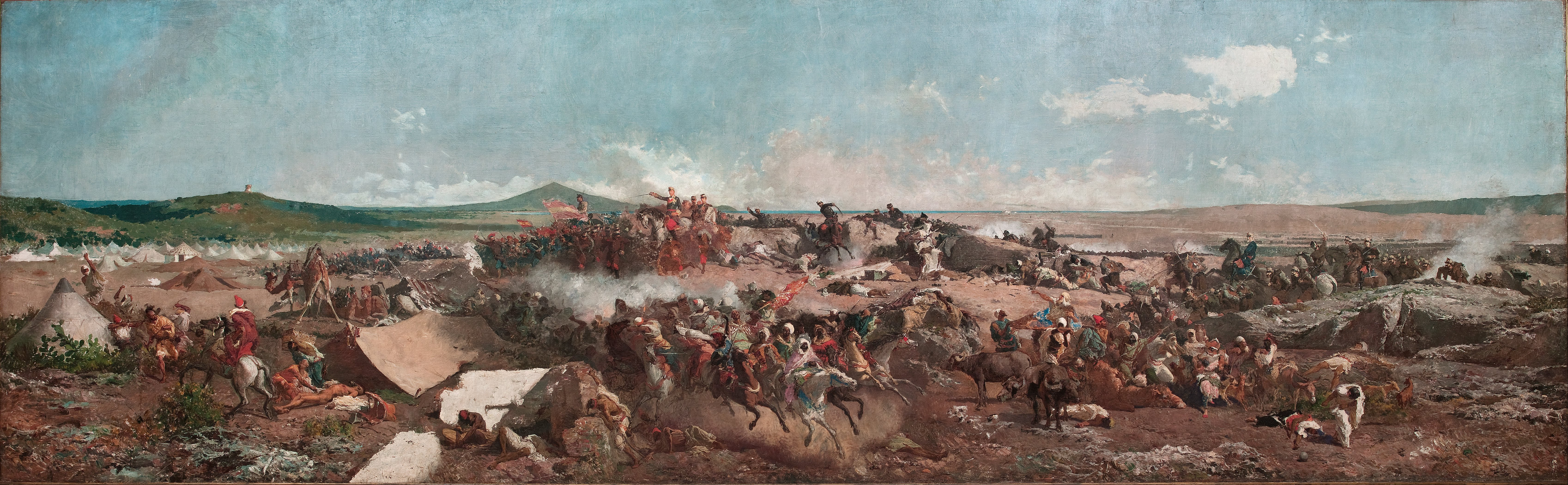
