= Ballota (Cudillero) =

- Parish
- Location within Spain
- Country: Spain
- Autonomous community: Asturias
- Province: Asturias
- Municipality: Cudillero

Ballota is one of nine parishes (administrative divisions) in the Cudillero municipality, within the province and autonomous community of Asturias, in northern Spain.

The population is 305 (INE 2008).

== Villages ==
- Reseḷḷinas
- Santa Marina
- Vaḷḷouta
