= Casas-Ibáñez =

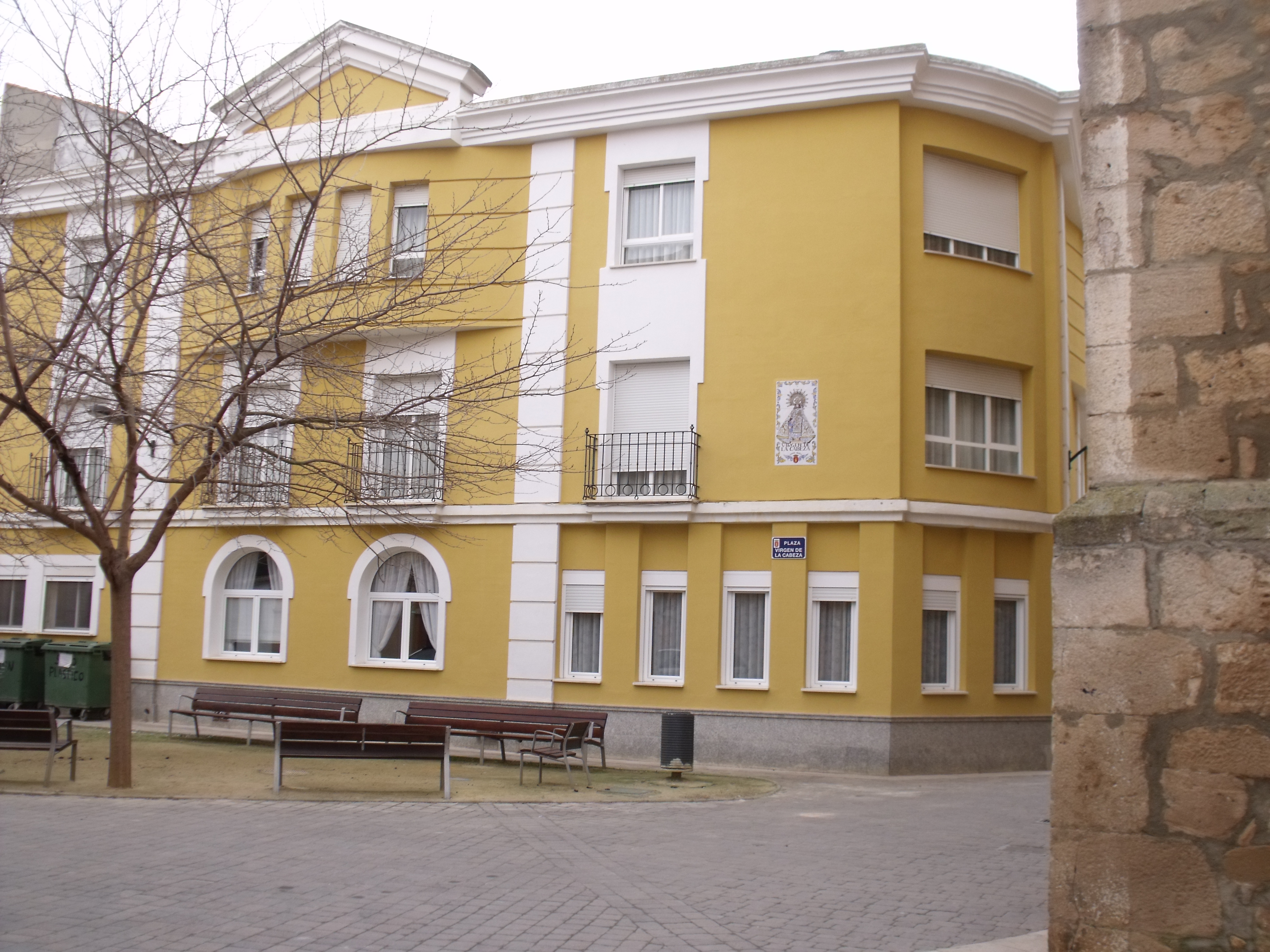

- Coat of arms
- Interactive map of Casas-Ibáñez
- Coordinates: 39°17′N 1°28′W
- Country: Spain
- Autonomous community: Castile-La Mancha
- Province: Albacete
- Comarca: Manchuela

Area
  - Total: 103.22 km^{2} (39.85 sq mi)
- Elevation: 707 m (2,320 ft)

Population (2025-01-01)
  - Total: 4,616
  - Density: 44.72/km^{2} (115.8/sq mi)
- Time zone: UTC+1 (CET)
  - Summer (DST): UTC+2 (CEST)

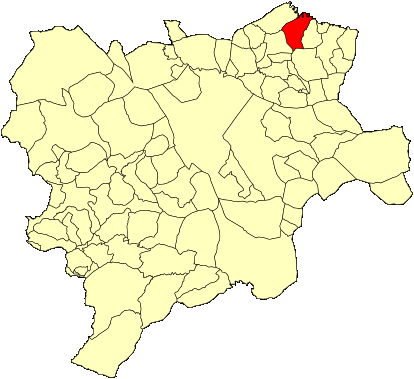
Casas-Ibáñez in Albacete province

Casas-Ibáñez is a municipality in Albacete, Castile-La Mancha, Spain. It has a population of 4,234.

== See also ==
- Manchuela
