= Antonio Ros de Olano =

Spanish writer, politician and military officer

The Most Excellent The Marquess of Guad-el-Jelú GE
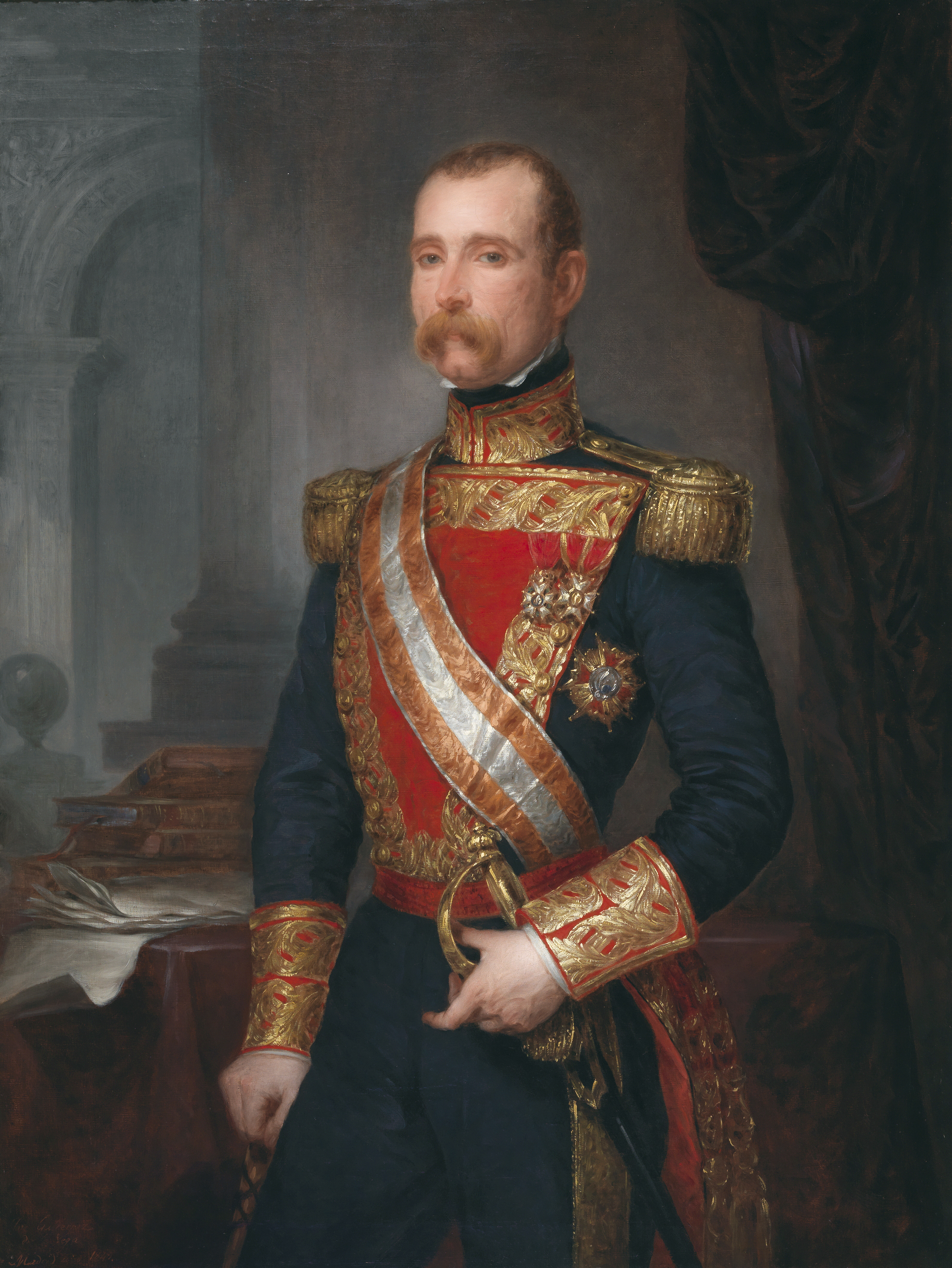
- Portrait by José Gutiérrez de la Vega

Personal details
- Born: 9 November 1808 Caracas, Captaincy General of Venezuela, Spain
- Died: 24 July 1886 Madrid, Spain

Military service
- Battles/wars: First Carlist War; Hispano–Moroccan War; Battle of Tétouan

Antonio José Teodoro Ros de Olano y Perpiñá, 1st Marquess of Guad-el-Jelú, GE (9 November 1808 – 24 July 1886) was a Spanish writer, politician and military officer who served in the First Carlist War and the Spanish–Moroccan War.

== Biography ==
Born in Caracas, Captaincy General of Venezuela, he moved to Mainland Spain at age five. He briefly served as Minister of Commerce, Instruction and Public Works in 1847.

Following his participation in the battle of Guad-el-Jelú ("Sweet River"), decisive for the outcome of the War in Morocco, he was created Marquess of Guad-el-Jelú, Count of La Almina, and Viscount of Ros.

Political offices
Preceded by Nicomedes Pastor Díaz y Corbelle	Minister of Commerce, Instruction and Public Works; 31 August – 3 November 1847	Succeeded by Luis José Sartorius
