= Battle of Castillejos =

1860 Hispano-Moroccan War battle

- Part of the Hispano-Moroccan War
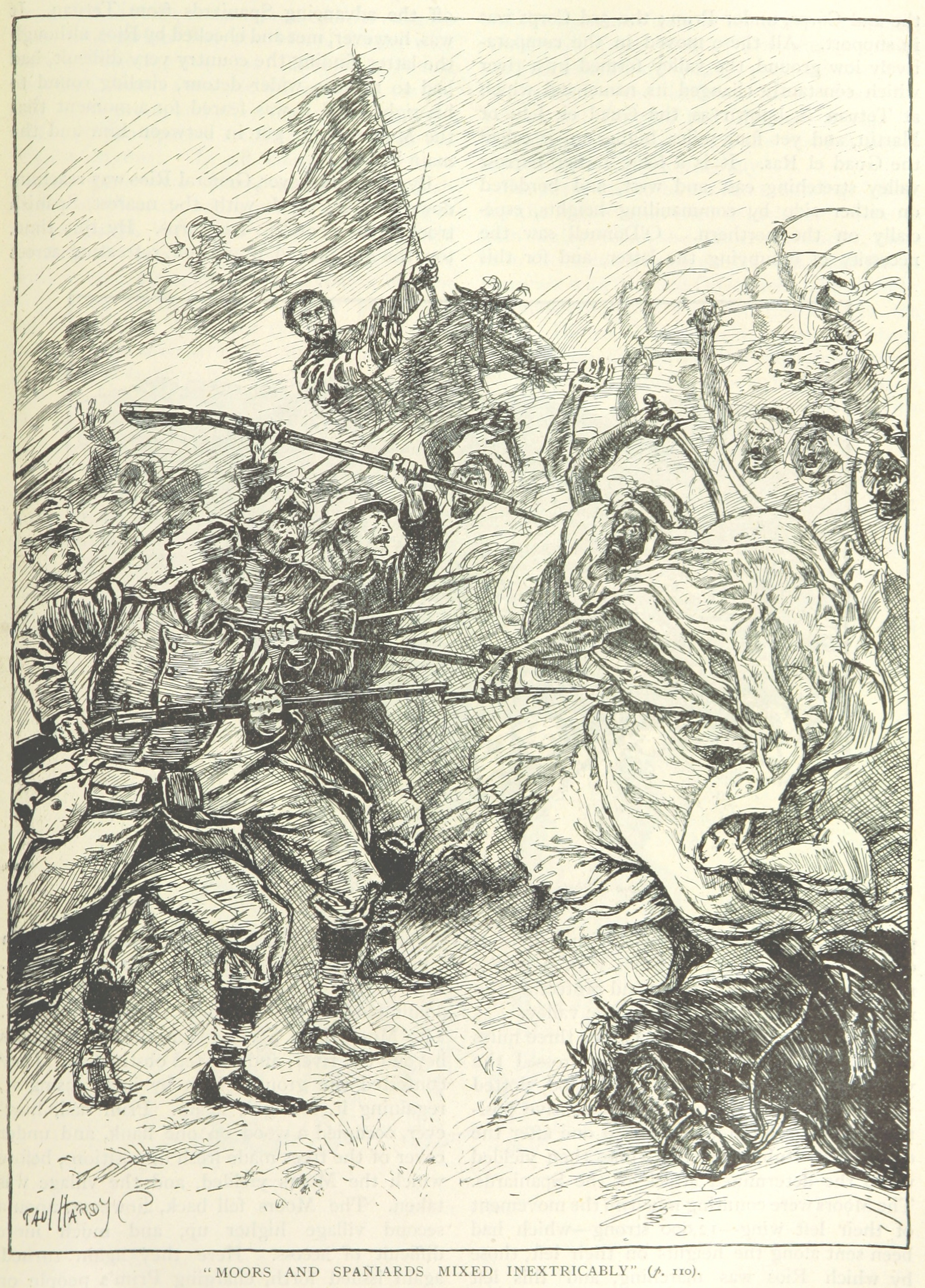
- The Battle of Castillejos, from Illustrated Battles of the Nineteenth Century, 1895.
Date	1 January 1860
Location	Castillejos, Morocco
Result	Spanish victory

Belligerents
Spain	Morocco

Commanders and leaders
(Spain) Leopoldo O'Donnell (Spain) Juan Prim	(Morocco) Mawlay Abbas

Strength
10,000	20,000

Casualties and losses
600	2,000

The Battle of Castillejos was fought on New Year's Day, 1860, between the Spanish Army of Africa under Leopoldo O'Donnell and the Moroccan Army under Mawlay Abbas in Fnideq (Castillejos) as the Spanish army attempted to capture the cities of Tétouan and Tangier. The Spanish were victorious.
