= Juan de Zavala =

Prime Minister of the Spanish Republic in 1874

The Most Excellent Juan de Zavala 1st Marquess of Sierra Bullones
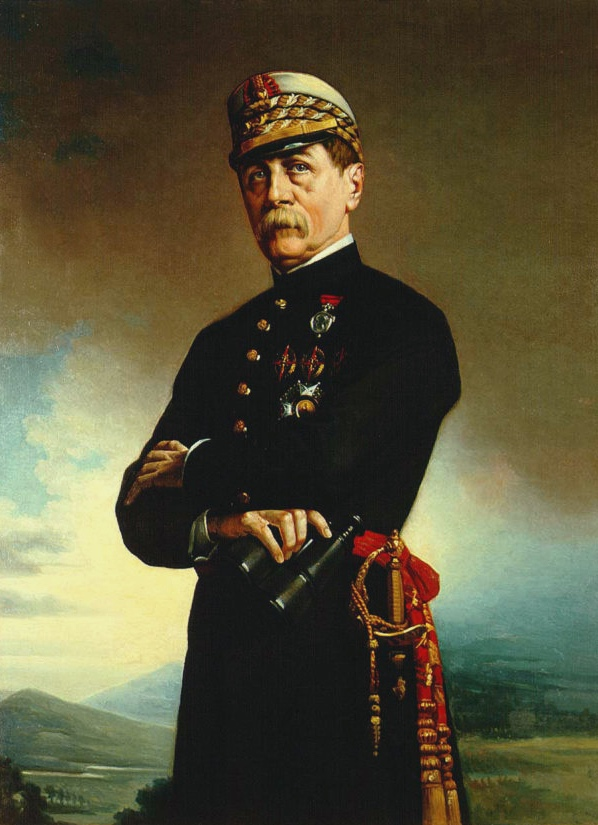
- Portrait of Zavala, c. 1860

Prime Minister of Spain
- In office 26 February 1874 – 29 June 1874
- President: Francisco Serrano
- Preceded by: Emilio Castelar
- Succeeded by: Práxedes Mateo Sagasta

Personal details
- Born: Juan de Zavala y de la Puente; 27 December 1804 Lima, Viceroyalty of Peru, Spain
- Died: 29 December 1879 (aged 75) Madrid, Spain

Juan de Zavala y de la Puente, 1st Marquess of Sierra Bullones (27 December 1804, in Lima, Viceroyalty of Peru – 29 December 1879, in Madrid, Spain) was a Spanish nobleman and politician. After fighting in the First Carlist War, the Marquess served as Prime Minister of Spain.

He was the son of Pedro José de Zavala y Bravo de Rivero, 7th Marquess of San Lorenzo, and Grimanesa de la Puente y Bravo de Lagunas, marchioness de la Puente.

== Marriage and issue ==
He married on 1839 María del Pilar de Guzmán, 24th Duchess of Nájera, and had five children:

- Juan de Zavala, 25th Duke of Nájera, husband of Caroliba Santamarca, 2nd Countess of Santamarca.
- Luis de Zavala, 26th Duke of Nájera, married to Guillermina Heredia y Barrón.
- María del Pilar de Zavala, 20th Marchioness of Aguilar de Campoo, married to Ventura García-Sancho, 1st Count of Consuegra.
- Juana de Zavala, 7th Countess of Villaseñor, married to Camilo Hurtado de Amézaga, 6th Marquess of the Riscal.
- María Grimanesa de Zavala, 7th Marchioness of San Lorenzo del Valleumbroso, married to Juan Larios y Enríquez.

Political offices
Preceded by Claudio Antón de Luzuriaga	Minister of State; 6 June 1855 – 14 July 1856	Succeeded by Nicomedes Pastor Díaz
