= Hispano-Moroccan War (1859–1860) =

Conflict between Spain and Morocco

- Part of the Spanish–Moroccan conflicts
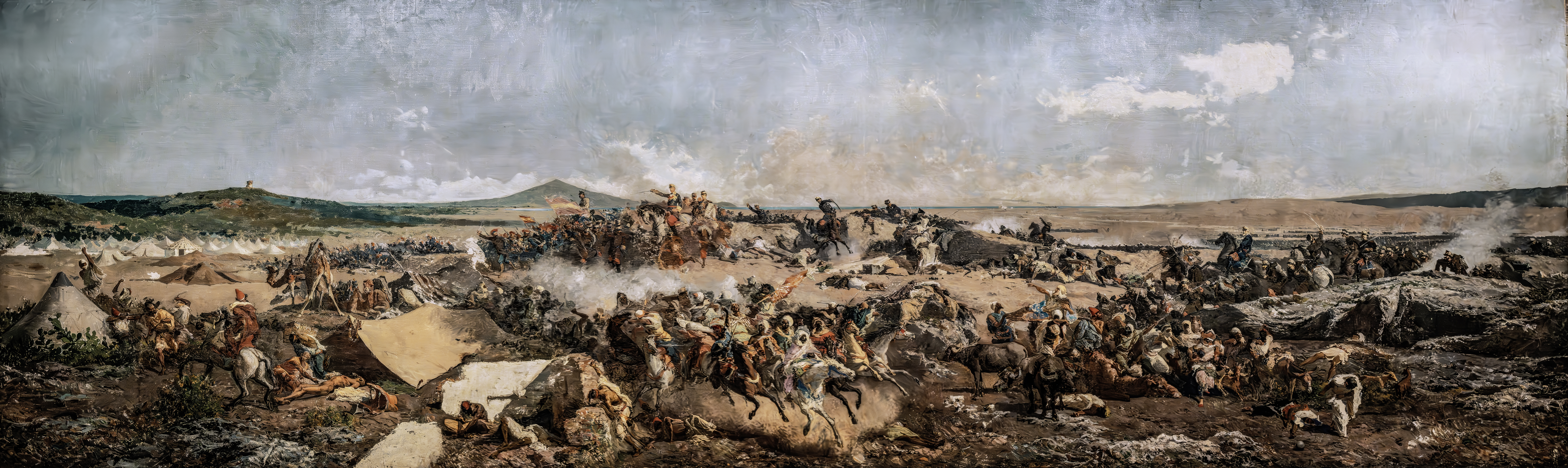
- Mariano Fortuny's depiction of the Battle of Tetuan, oil on canvas (MNAC).
Date	22 October 1859 – 26 April 1860
Location	Northern Morocco
Result	Spanish victory Treaty of Wad Ras: Morocco recognizes Spanish sovereignty over Ceuta and Melilla; Sidi Ifni became a Spanish possession; Retrocession of Santa Cruz de la Mar Pequeña (moot location) to Spain; Spain receives 20 million duros as war reparations

Belligerents
Spain	Morocco

Commanders and leaders
(Spain) Isabella II (Spain) Antonio Ros Olano (Spain) Leopoldo O'Donnell (Spain) Juan de Zavala (Spain) Juan Prim	(Morocco) Muhammad IV (Morocco) Mawlay Abbas (Morocco) Mawlay Ahmad

Strength
Expeditionary Army: (Spain) 44,740 soldiers (Spain) 3,000 cavalry (Spain) 78 artillery Spanish Armada: (Spain) 24 warships (Spain) 11 transport vessels Week 6 reinforcements (Spain) 5,600 soldiers (Spain) 3,450 militias	Cherifian Army: (Morocco) 150,000

Casualties and losses
(Spain) 4,040 killed: 1,152 in battle; 2,888 from disease; (Spain) 4,994 wounded	(Morocco) 6,000 killed
- About 10,000 dead in total

The Hispano-Moroccan War, also known as the Spanish–Moroccan War, the First Moroccan War, the Tetuán War, or, in Spain, as the War of Africa, was fought from Spain's declaration of war on Morocco on 22 October 1859 until the Treaty of Wad-Ras on 26 April 1860. It began with a conflict over the borders of the Spanish city of Ceuta and was fought in northern Morocco. Morocco sued for peace after the Spanish victory at the Battle of Tetuán.

== Background ==
Throughout the 19th century, Morocco suffered military defeats at the hands of European powers, notably in the Franco-Moroccan War in 1844. In 1856 the Moroccan government signed the Anglo-Moroccan Treaty with the British which set the Moroccan customs duty at 10% and brought an end to royal monopolies.

Since 1840, the Spanish cities of Ceuta and Melilla often experienced attacks by Riffian tribesmen, especially in 1844, 1845, and 1848.

== War ==
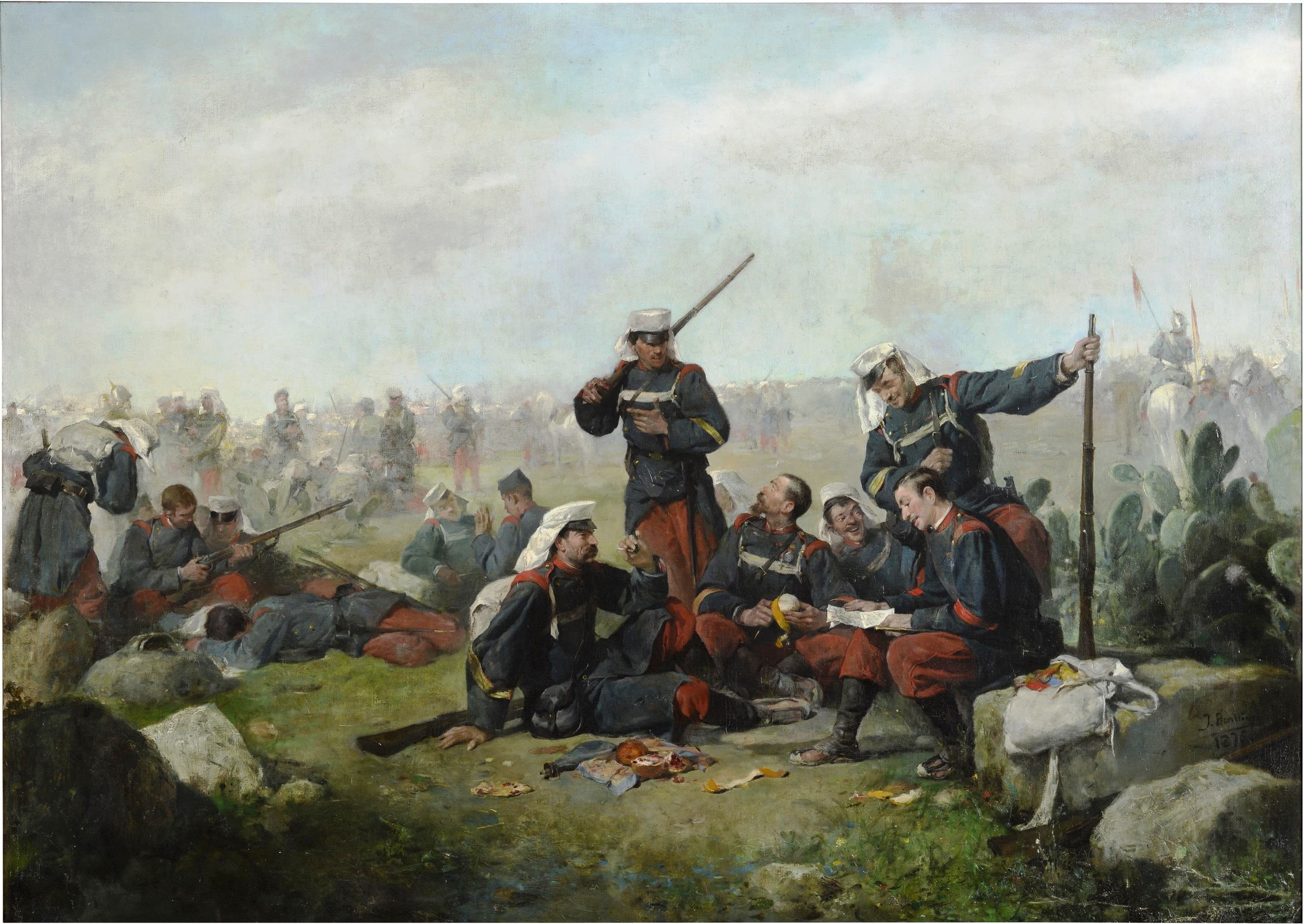
Spanish infantry during the war, by José Benlliure (1876).

The casus belli for Spain were the unrelenting attacks of Riffian tribesmen on Spanish settlements in North Africa but also the increasing pressure of Queen Isabella on congress to attack; following unfruitful negotiations with Sultan Abd al-Rahman vis-à-vis the reparations (the latter, unable to control the cabilas, actually died in the midst of negotiations and was replaced by his son Muhammad IV), a declaration of war propelled by Leopoldo O'Donnell was unanimously passed by the Congress of Deputies on 22 October 1859.

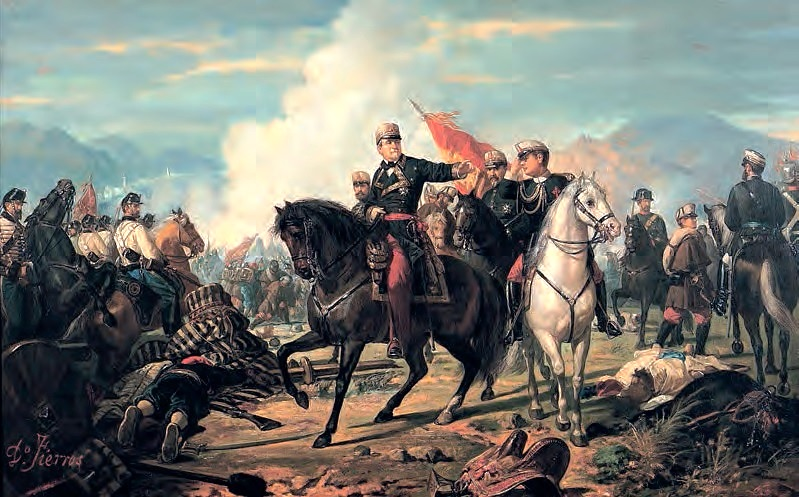
Battle of Tetouan, by Dionisio Fierros (1894).

The expeditionary army that left Algeciras was made up of about 45,000 men, 3,000 mules and horses, and 78 pieces of artillery, supported by a war squad made up of a ship of the line; two propeller and one sail frigates, two corvettes, four schooners, eleven wheeled steamers and three feluccas, in addition to nine steamers and three Feluccas that acted as troop transports.

The objectives set were the taking of Tetouan and the occupation of the port of Tangier. On December 17, hostilities were unleashed by the column commanded by Zabala that occupied the Sierra de Bullones. Two days later, Echagüe conquered the Serrallo Palace and O'Donnell led the force that landed in Ceuta on the 21st. On the 25th, the three army corps had consolidated their positions and were awaiting the order to advance towards Tetouan. On January 1, 1860, General Prim stormed to the mouth of Uad el-Jelúwith the flank support of General Zabala and that of the fleet that kept the enemy forces away from the coast. The skirmishes continued until January 31, when a Moroccan offensive action was contained, and O'Donnell began the march towards Tetouan, with the support of the Catalan volunteers. It was covered by General Ros de Olano and Prim on the flanks. The pressure of the Spanish artillery destroyed the Moroccan ranks to the point that the remains of this army took refuge in Tetouan, which fell on February 6.

The Spaniards entered Tetouan on February 6, 1860. They bombarded the city for the following two days which allowed chaos to reign free. Riffian tribesmen poured into the city and pillaged it (mainly the Jewish quarters). The Moroccan historian Ahmad ibn Khalid al-Nasiri described the looting during the bombardment:

A tumult broke out in the town,... the hand of the mob stretched out to plunder, and even [normal] people took off the cloak of decency.... People of the Jabal, and the Arabs, and the riffraff began to pillage and steal; they broke down the doors of the houses and the shops.... keeping at it the whole night until the morning

— Ahmad ibn Khalid al-Nasiri

On February 6 the Spanish entered the city, ending both the battle and the war.

== Aftermath ==
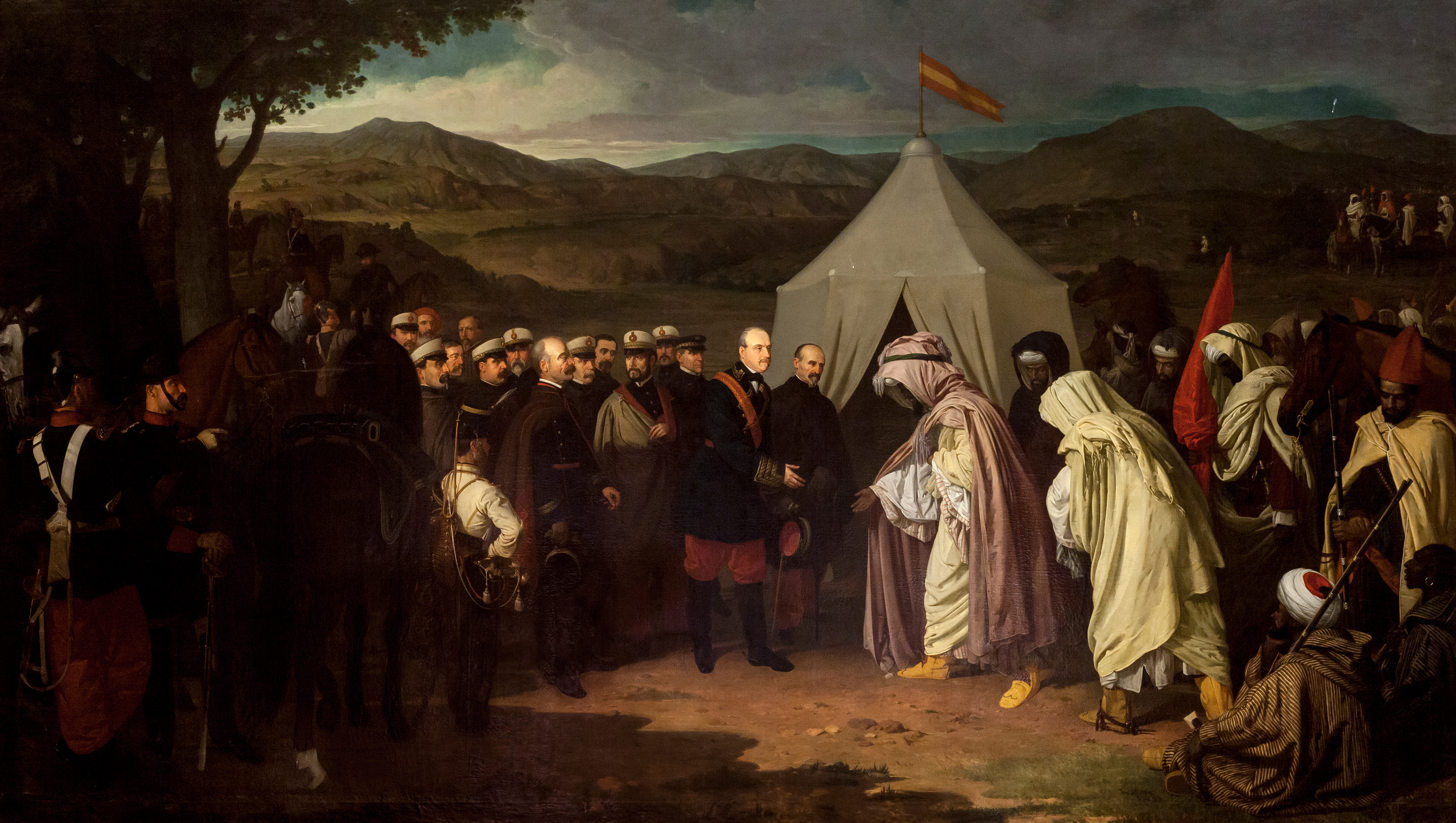
The Peace of Wad-Ras, by Joaquín Domínguez Bécquer (1870).

Following an armistice of 32 days, the Treaty of Wad-Ras or Peace of Tétouan was signed on 26 April 1860. The treaty was indirectly influenced by the queen of Spain which demands were harsh for the Moroccan side and contemplated the extension on perpetuity of the Spanish presence in Ceuta and Melilla, the end of tribal raids on those cities, the recognition by Morocco of Spanish sovereignty over the Chafarinas Islands, the retrocession of the territory of Santa Cruz de la Mar Pequeña (a territory of uncertain location by that time, ultimately Ifni) to Spain in order to establish a fishing post, the permission to missionaries for establishing a Christian church in Tétouan, and the Spanish administration over the later city until reparations of 20,000,000 duros were paid.

Once Morocco paid the compensation (partially through money lent by the British), O'Donnell retired his troops from Tétouan.

== See also ==
- Battle of Annual
- 1861 Spanish Reconquest of the Dominican Republic

== Sources ==
- Fernández-Rivero, Juan-Antonio (2011). "La fotografía militar en la guerra de África: Enrique Facio". Ceuta y la Guerra de África de 1859–1860 (PDF). Ceuta: Instituto de Estudios Ceutíes. pp. 459–492. ISBN 978-84-92627-30-1.
- Romero Morales, Yasmina (2014). "Prensa y literatura en la Guerra de África (1859–1860). Opinión publicada, patriotismo y xenofobia". Historia Contemporánea (49). Bilbao: University of the Basque Country: 619–644. ISSN 1130-2402.
- World History at KMLA
- Moroccan War 1859–1860
- "A History of Modern Morocco" pp. 24–25 Susan Gilson Miller, Cambridge University Press 2013
- Sarkees, Meredith Reid (2010). Resort to War: 1816 - 2007. SAGE Publications. ISBN 978-0-87289-434-1.
