= José Cabrinetty =

19th-century Spanish Brigadier

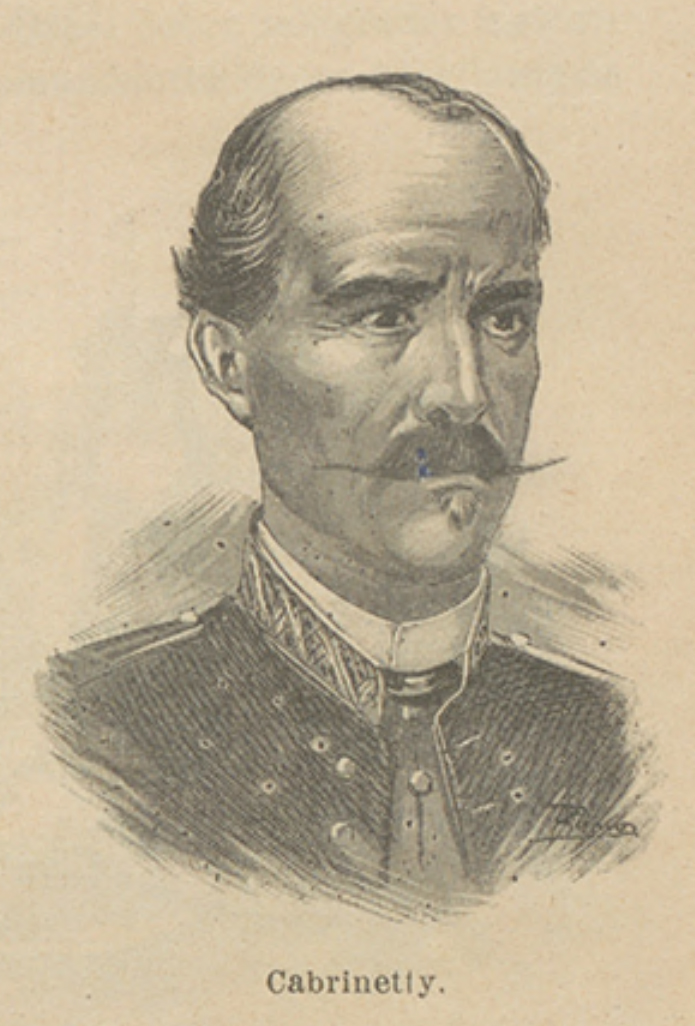
- Born: 26 July 1823; Palma de Mallorca, Balearic Islands, Spain
- Died: 9 July 1873 (aged 49); Alpens, Catalonia, Spain
- Military career
- Allegiance: Kingdom of Spain; Liberals
- Branch: Spanish Army
- Service years: 1837 – 1873
- Rank: Brigadier
- Conflicts: First Carlist War; Hispano-Moroccan War: Battle of Los Castillejos; Third Carlist War: Battle of Alpens †

José Cabrinetty Cladera (1823-1873) was a Spanish Brigadier who was notable for being an Anti-Carlist during the Third Carlist War and a notable figure for the Spanish liberals after his death at Alpens.

== Biography ==
Cladera began his military career at the age of fourteen. He fought in the last battles of the First Carlist War, the first in the Basque Country and then the takings of Aliaga, Morella and Berga. Initially it was under the command of Leopoldo O'Donnell and later of that of Baldomero Espartero, reaching the rank of second lieutenant. When Espartero went into exile, he accompanied him with two of his brothers.

In 1847 he returned from exile and re-entered the army with the rank of lieutenant. In 1859 he was promoted to captain and he participated in several battles of the Hispano-Moroccan War, including the Battle of Los Castillejos.

At the beginning of the Third Carlist War in 1872, he was already a lieutenant colonel, but was promoted to brigadier. At first he fought in the Penedès; later, in the comarcas of Girona and finally held the position of general commander of the province of Lleida. In 1873 he liberated Puigcerdá from the siege of the Carlists. He relentlessly pursued the Carlist leader Francisco Savalls, who defeated him on 9 July 1873 at the Battle of Alpens. Cabrinetty was shot to the back of the neck as he rode into the town square, leading to the belief that he might have been killed by his own men.

The news of the government defeat in Alpens and the death of Brigadier Cabrinetty gave rise to anti-Carlist and pro-Republican demonstrations in Barcelona two days after his death, on 11 July 1873.

== Awards ==
- Royal and Military Order of Saint Hermenegild (Cross)
- Laureate Cross of Saint Ferdinand
- A statue erected in Puigcerdá which was destroyed by Anarchists in 1936 and wouldn't be rebuilt until 2012.
