= Third Carlist War =

Spanish civil war (1872–1876)

- Part of the Carlist Wars
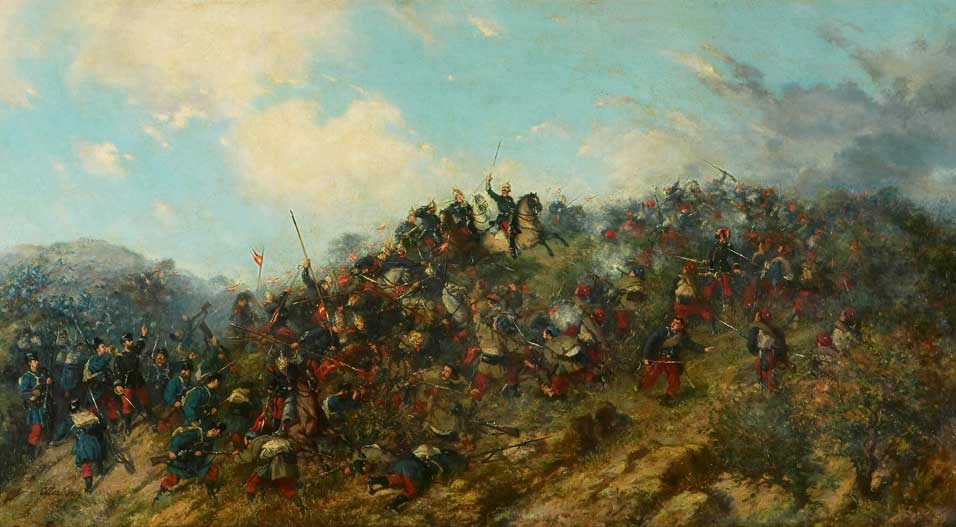
- The Battle of Treviño, 7 July 1875, Francisco Oller
Date	21 April 1872 – 28 February 1876
Location	Spain
Result	Liberal and republican victory: Spanish Constitution of 1876; Basque Economic Agreement

Belligerents
Liberals; Republicans	Carlists

Commanders and leaders
See list: Amadeo I Alfonso XII Martínez-Campos Manuel Pavía Francisco Serrano Ramón Blanco Eulogio Despujol Domingo Moriones Manuel de la Concha José Cabrinetty † Ramón Nouvilas Jenaro Quesada	See list: Carlos VII Alfonso Carlos Ramón Cabrera Torcuato Mendiri Nicolas Ollo Antonio Dorregaray Pascual Cucala Alfonso de Borbón Francisco Savalls Rafael Tristany Joan Castells Joaquin Elio José Santes Tomas Segarra Manuel de Bello Ramón Altarriba

The Third Carlist War (Spanish: Tercera Guerra Carlista), which occurred from 1872 to 1876, was the last Carlist War in Spain. It is sometimes referred to as the "Second Carlist War", as the earlier "Second" War (1847–1849) was smaller in scale and relatively trivial in political consequence.

Leading up to the war, Queen Isabella II abdicated the throne in 1868, and the unpopular Amadeo I, son of King Victor Emmanuel II of Italy, was proclaimed King of Spain in 1870. In response, the Carlist pretender, Carlos VII, tried to earn the support of various Spanish regions by promising to reintroduce various area-specific customs and laws. The Carlists proclaimed the restoration of Catalan, Valencian and Aragonese fueros (charters) which had been abolished at the beginning of the 18th century by King Philip V in his unilateral Nueva Planta decrees.

The call for rebellion made by the Carlists was echoed in Catalonia and especially in the Basque region (Gipuzkoa, Álava, Biscay and Navarre), where the Carlists managed to erect a temporary state. During the war, Carlist forces occupied several inland Spanish towns, the most important ones being La Seu d'Urgell and Estella in Navarre. They also laid siege to the cities of Bilbao and San Sebastián, but failed to seize them.

The Third Carlist War saw a series of regime changes in Spain, beginning with the declaration of the First Spanish Republic after the abdication of Amadeo I in February 1873. Over one year later, in December 1874, a military coup installed a new Bourbon monarch, Alfonso XII, marking the beginning of the Bourbon Restoration in Spain.

After four years of war, on 28 February 1876, Carlos VII was defeated, and went into exile in France. On the same day, King Alfonso XII of Spain entered Pamplona. After the end of the war, the Basque charters (fueros/foruak) were abolished, shifting the border customs from the Ebro River to the Spanish coast. In the chartered territories, home rule provisions, left over from the resolution of the First Carlist War, were abolished, and conscription of youth in the Spanish army became compulsory.

The war resulted in between 7,000 and 50,000 casualties.

== Introduction ==
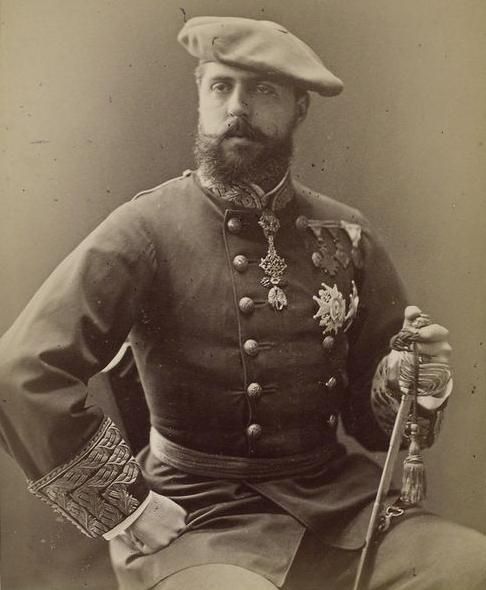
Carlos VII, Carlist pretender

The Third Carlist War began in 1871, after the overthrow of Isabella II in La Gloriosa revolution in 1868 and the subsequent coronation of Amadeo I of Savoy as King of Spain in 1870. The selection of Amadeo I as King instead of the Carlist pretender, Carlos VII, was considered a great insult to the Carlists who had strong support in northern Spain, especially in Catalonia, Navarre and the Basque Provinces (Basque Country)

After some internal dissensions in 1870–1871, ending with the removal of Ramón Cabrera as the head of the Carlist party, the Carlists started a general uprising against Amadeo I's government and its Liberal supporters. The Third Carlist War became the final act of a long fight between Spanish progressives (centralists) and traditionalists which started after the Spanish Peninsular War (1808–1814) and the promulgation of the constitution of Cadiz in 1812 which ended the ancien regime in Spain. Mistrust and rivalry among members of the royal family also enlarged the conflict. The three Carlist wars were started for diverse reasons: the establishment of the Pragmatic Sanction of Ferdinand VII caused the First Carlist War, the inability to find a compromise led to the Second Carlist War, and the proclamation of a foreign king as Spanish monarch sparked the Third Carlist War.

Some contemporary authors described the Third Carlist War as deadly, especially for civilians on the sidelines of the conflict.

The bell rings to the dead across the heroic town of Igualada...Horrible details...People [killed] by bayonets, burned houses, factories attacked at dawn, robberies, rap[es], insults...

— La Campana de Gràcia, July 27, 1873, about the Carlist attack on the town of Igualada (Barcelona)

About the Carlists' entrance on Vendrell thousands atrocities are told, done by the followers of absolutism... If our brothers fell to the edge of the Carlist dagger, why we the liberals have to be considered with them?... It is necessary to fight the war with war and to employ all kind of resources to exterminate the bandits that burn, steal and kill in the name of a religion and a peace.

— La Redención del Pueblo, March 6, 1874, about the entrance of the Carlists in the town of Vendrell (Tarragona)

== Opposing parties ==
=== Carlists ===
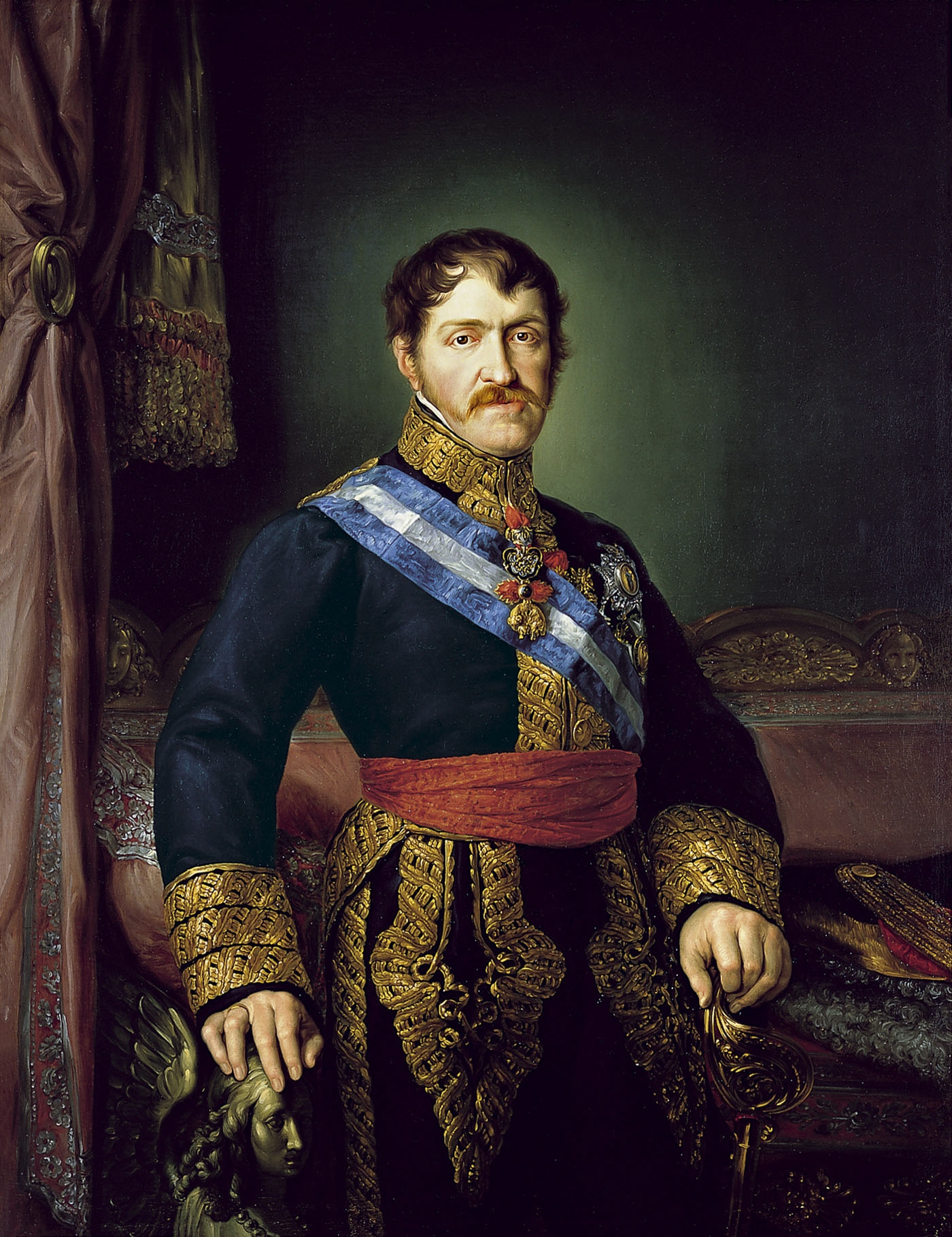
Infant Carlos Maria Isidro

The Carlist party was formed in the last years of Ferdinand VII's (1784–1833) reign. Carlism is named after the infant Carlos Maria Isidro (1788–1855), count of Molina and Ferdinand's brother. The pragmatic sanction, published by Ferdinand in 1830, abolished the Salic Law, allowing women to be queens of Spain in their own right. This meant that Isabel, Ferdinand's daughter, became heir instead of Carlos, his brother.

Carlos almost instantly became a cause around which Spain's conservative groups could unite. The anti-liberalism of authors such as Fernando de Zeballos, Lorenzo Hervás y Panduro and Francisco Alvarado during the 1820s was a precursor to the Carlist movement. Another important aspect of the Carlist ideology was its defense of the Catholic Church and its institutions, including the Inquisition and the special tributary laws, against the comparatively more liberal crown. The Carlists identified themselves with Spanish military traditions, adopting the Burgundian cross of the 16th- and 17th-century tercios. This nostalgia for Spain's past was an important rallying point for Carlism. There was also a perceived support for the feudal system displaced by the French occupation, although this is disputed by historians. The Carlists summarized their beliefs in the motto: "For God, for the Fatherland and the King."

In the deeply religious and conservative atmosphere of 19th century Spain, Carlism attracted a large number of followers, particularly among sections of society which resented the growing liberalism of the Spanish state. Carlism found most of its supporters in rural areas, especially in places which had previously enjoyed special status before 1813, such as Catalonia and especially the Basque Country. In these parts of the country, Carlists enjoyed support from the Catholic peasantry and minor nobles, with occasional support from the major nobility.

=== Liberals ===
After Ferdinand VII's death in 1833 without a male heir, the succession was disputed, despite the abrogation of the Salic law in 1830. As the new queen Isabel was only a child, her mother, Maria Cristina, became regent until Isabel was ready to reign in her own right. Because conservatives backed Carlos, Maria Cristina was forced to side with the Liberals, who sympathized with the ideals of the French Revolution. Liberals were well-represented in the high echelons of the army and among the large landowners, and drew some support from the middle classes.

The Liberals promoted industrialization and social modernization. Reforms included the confiscation and sale of church lands and other institutions that supported the old regime, the establishment of elected parliaments, the construction of railways and the general expansion of industry throughout Spain. There was also a strong current of anti-clericalism among them.

== Background ==
=== First and Second Carlist war ===
==== First Carlist War ====
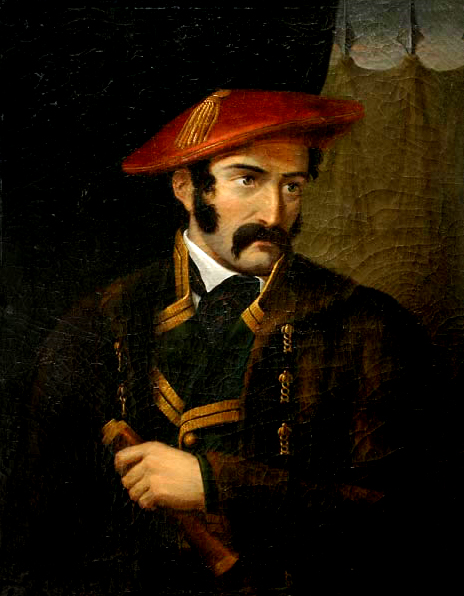
Tomas de Zumalacárregui commandant of the Carlist forces in the Basque Country

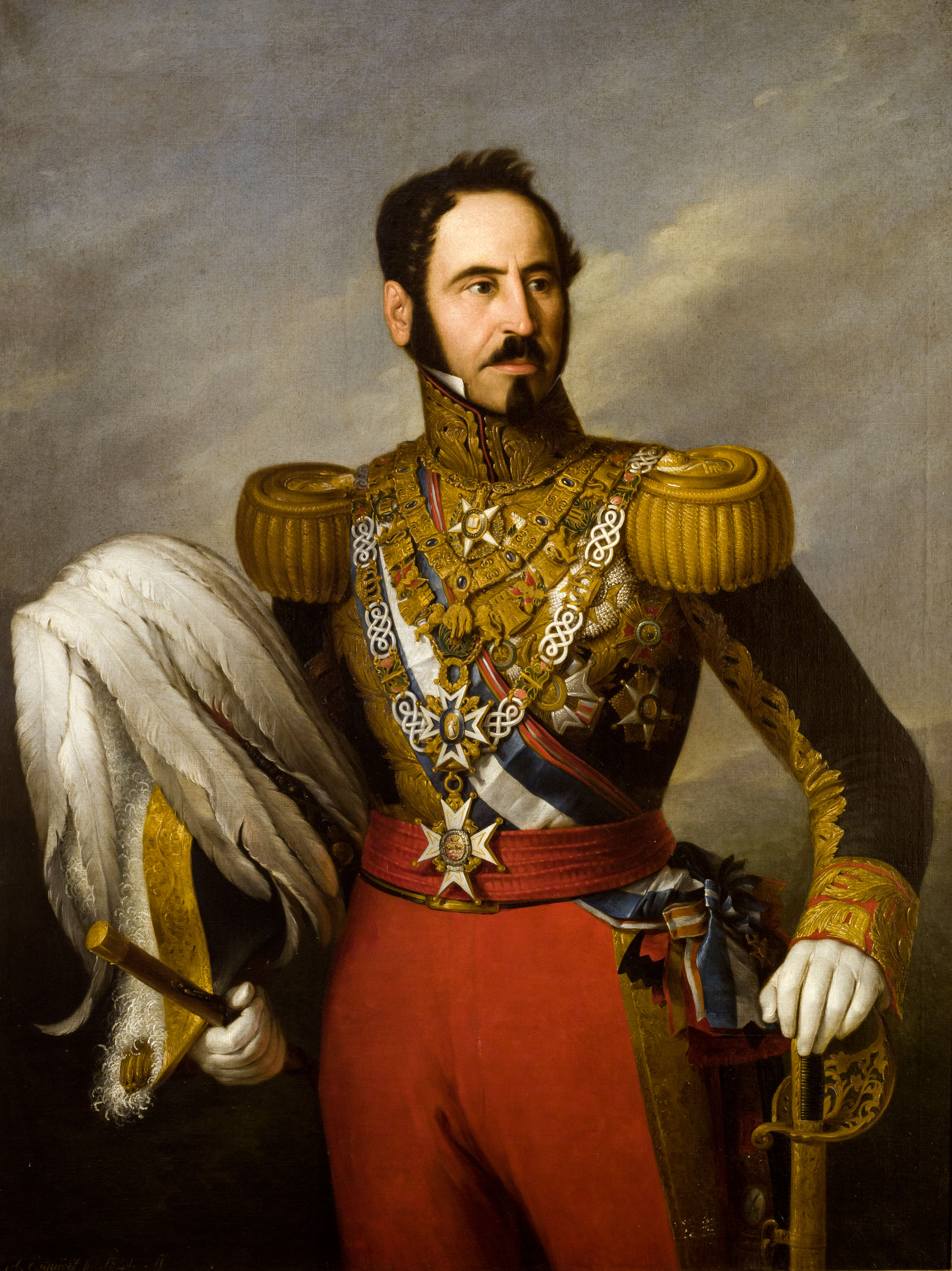
General Espartero commander of the liberal army and later regent of Spain

After Ferdinand's death, the government undertook a division of Spain into provinces and "historic regions" with the 1833 territorial division of Spain. The division overruled the traditional administration of the Basque districts, who held a specific autonomous status within Spain. For example, Navarre was still a Basque-based kingdom with its own decision-making bodies and customs on the Ebro river. The unilateral decision was regarded as a hostile government move by the Basque people, precipitating a general uprising in the Basque Provinces and Navarre in support of the traditionalist Carlists, resulting in the First Carlist War. The resulting success allowed Carlists to gain control of the countryside, although cities like Bilbao, San Sebastián, Pamplona and Vitoria-Gasteiz stayed in Liberal hands. The insurrection spread to the Castilla la Vieja, Aragon and Catalonia, where Carlist armies and guerrillas operated until the end of the war. Expeditions outside these areas resulted in limited success.

The Basque Country was subdued on August 31, 1839, with the Convenio de Vergara and Abrazo de Vergara signed between the Liberal general Baldomero Espartero and the Carlist general Rafael Maroto. Carlos, the pretender, crossed the Bidasoa river into France for exile, but Carlists in Catalonia and Aragon continued fighting until July 1840, when they escaped to France led by the Carlist general Ramón Cabrera.

Prominent figures emerged on both sides during the war. On the Liberal side, Baldomero Espartero rose to prominence and replaced Maria Cristina as regent in 1840, although his subsequent unpopularity meant that he was later overthrown by a coalition of politicians and moderate military figures. On the Carlist side, Ramón Cabrera rose to become the head of the Carlist party, a position he would hold until 1870. His future move to change his allegiance to the Spanish regime during the Third Carlist War would prove crucial to the government's success.

==== Second Carlist War ====
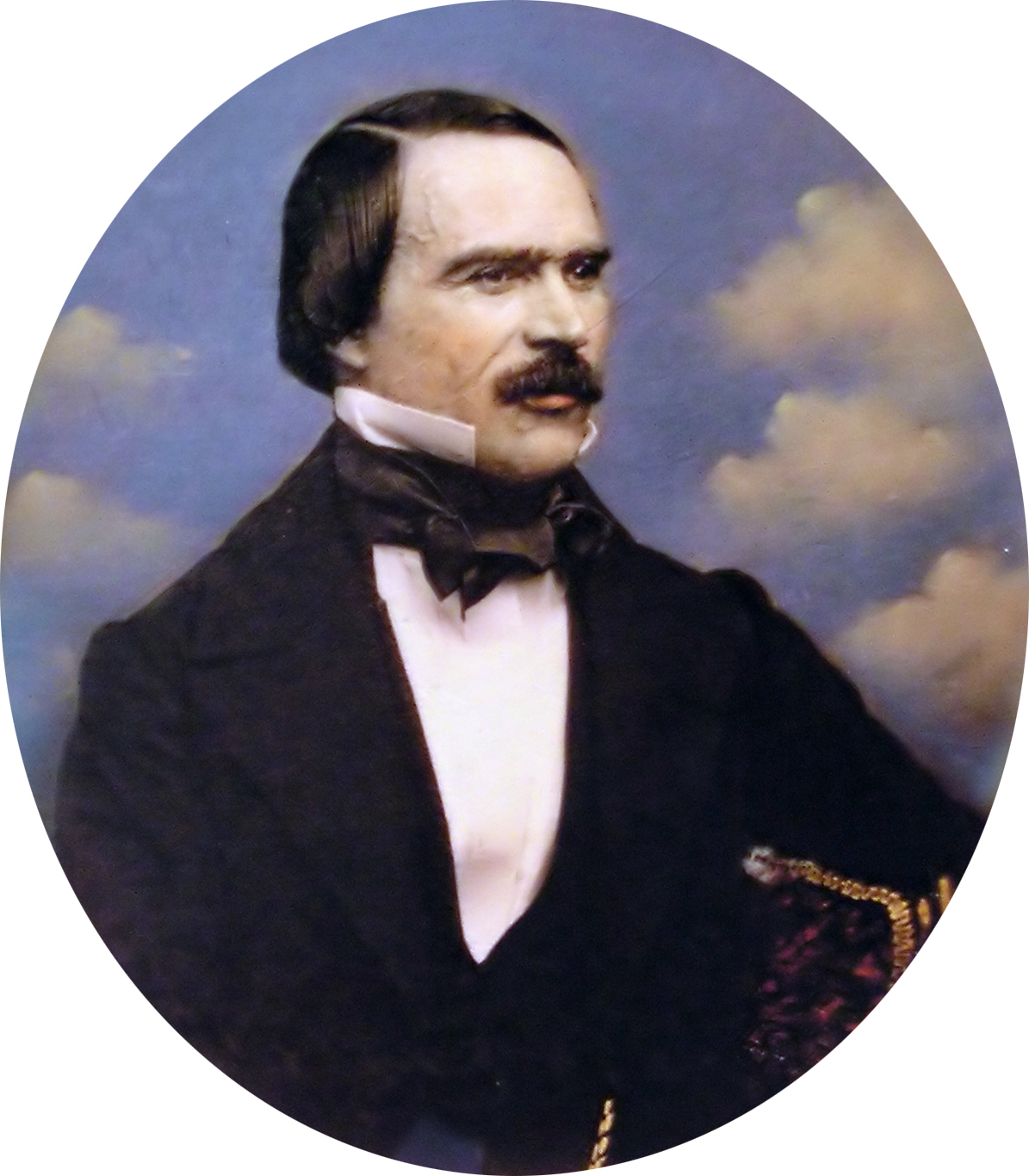
Ramón Cabrera. A prominent figure in the Carlist ranks, his later support for the government of the restoration was crucial to undermining the Carlist cause.

The Second Carlist War started in 1846, after the failure of a scheme to marry Isabel II with the Carlist claimant, Carlos Luis de Borbón. Fighting was concentrated in the mountains of South Catalonia and Teruel until 1849. The context was an agricultural and industrial crisis that hit Catalonia in 1846, together with unpopular taxes and military service laws introduced by the government of Ramon Maria Narvaez.

Another critical factor was the presence of lingering trabucaires, or Carlist fighters, from the First Carlist War who had neither surrendered to the government nor fled to exile. Those circumstances resulted in the creation of the first Carlist parties in 1846, usually consisting of no more than 500 men and always directed by a cabecilla, or chief, often a veteran from the first war. These groups attacked politicians and military units.

As 1847 ended with an escalation of fighting, Carlists, backed by progressives and republicans, gathered 4,000 men in Catalonia. In 1848, Carlists rose up in many parts of Spain, especially in Catalonia, Navarre, Gipuzkoa, Burgos, Maestrat, Aragon, Extremadura and Castille. The uprisings failed in almost all parts of Spain except for Catalonia and Maestrat, where Ramón Cabrera arrived in mid-1848 to create the Ejército Real de Cataluña, or the Royal Army of Catalonia. However, Carlist failures in the rest of Spain, in addition to the campaign conducted by government commander Manuel Gutiérrez de la Concha to weaken the Carlist presence in Catalonia during fall 1848, condemned the Carlist cause to failure. In January 1849, the Liberal army in Catalonia numbered 50,000, while the Carlist army numbered only 26,000. The detention of the Carlist pretender, Carlos VI, on the frontier when he was attempting to enter Spain put an end to the uprising in April 1849. Outnumbered, without a leader and having failed to achieve a victory in all fronts, Ramón Cabrera and the Carlists in Catalonia fled to France in April and May 1849. Later, an amnesty announced by the government convinced some to return to Spain, but most stayed in exile.

=== Spain's political situation before the war ===
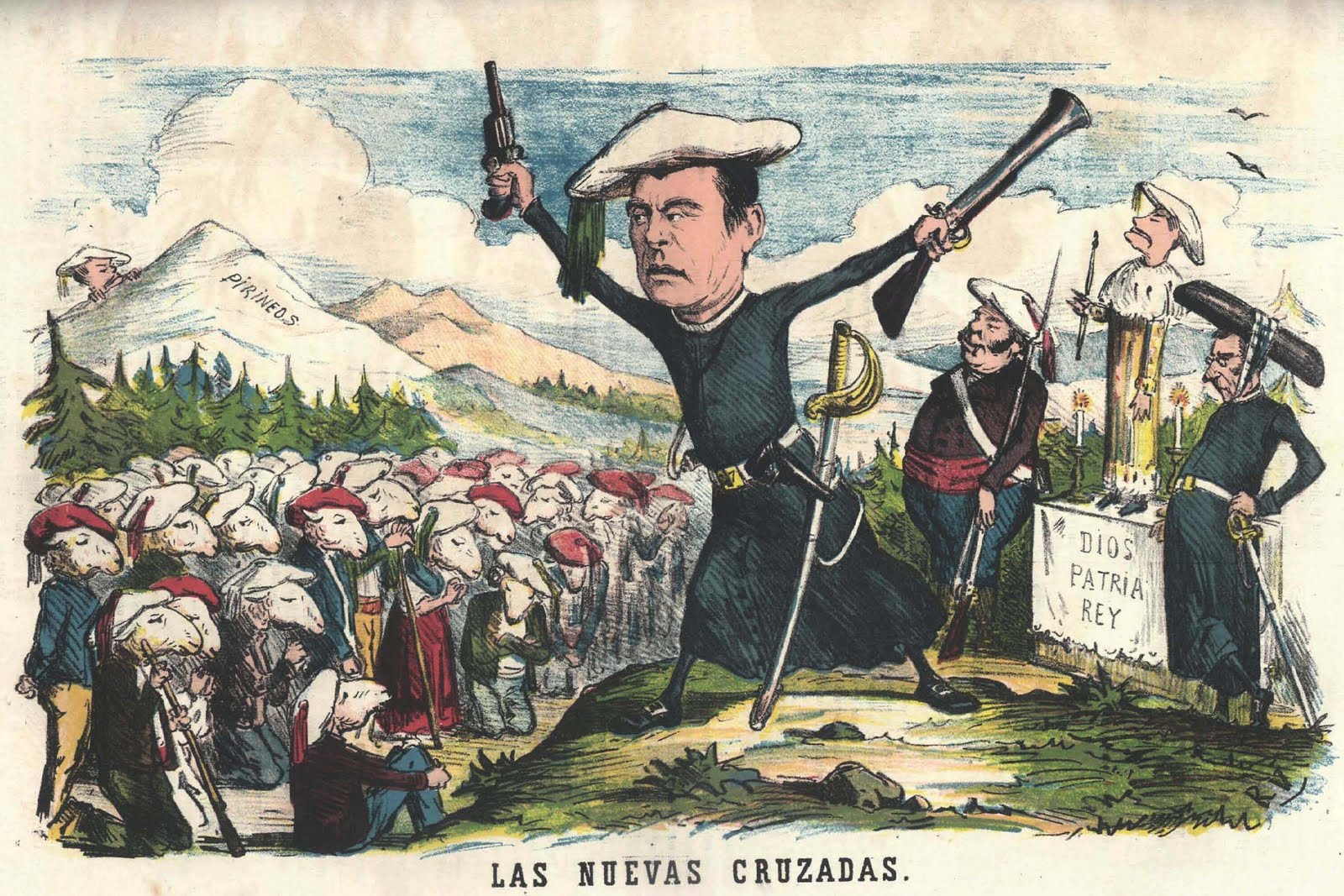
Caricature of the Carlists (1870)

Amidst opposing political ideals in Spain, the growing Industrial Revolution and constant conflict in Spanish politics, the Third Carlist War was a culmination of a long political process. The political appearance of the conflict, exemplified by the struggle for the Spanish crown, masked a more crude reality. The growth of liberal ideals after Napoleon Bonaparte's occupation of Spain and Spain's subsequent fight for independence alarmed Spain's traditional groups, who decided to fight for their beliefs. Tumultuous reigns of monarchs Ferdinand VII, Isabel II and Amadeo I exemplified the political unrest present in Spain, and resulted in the loss of traditionalist predominance, especially during the reign of Isabel II.

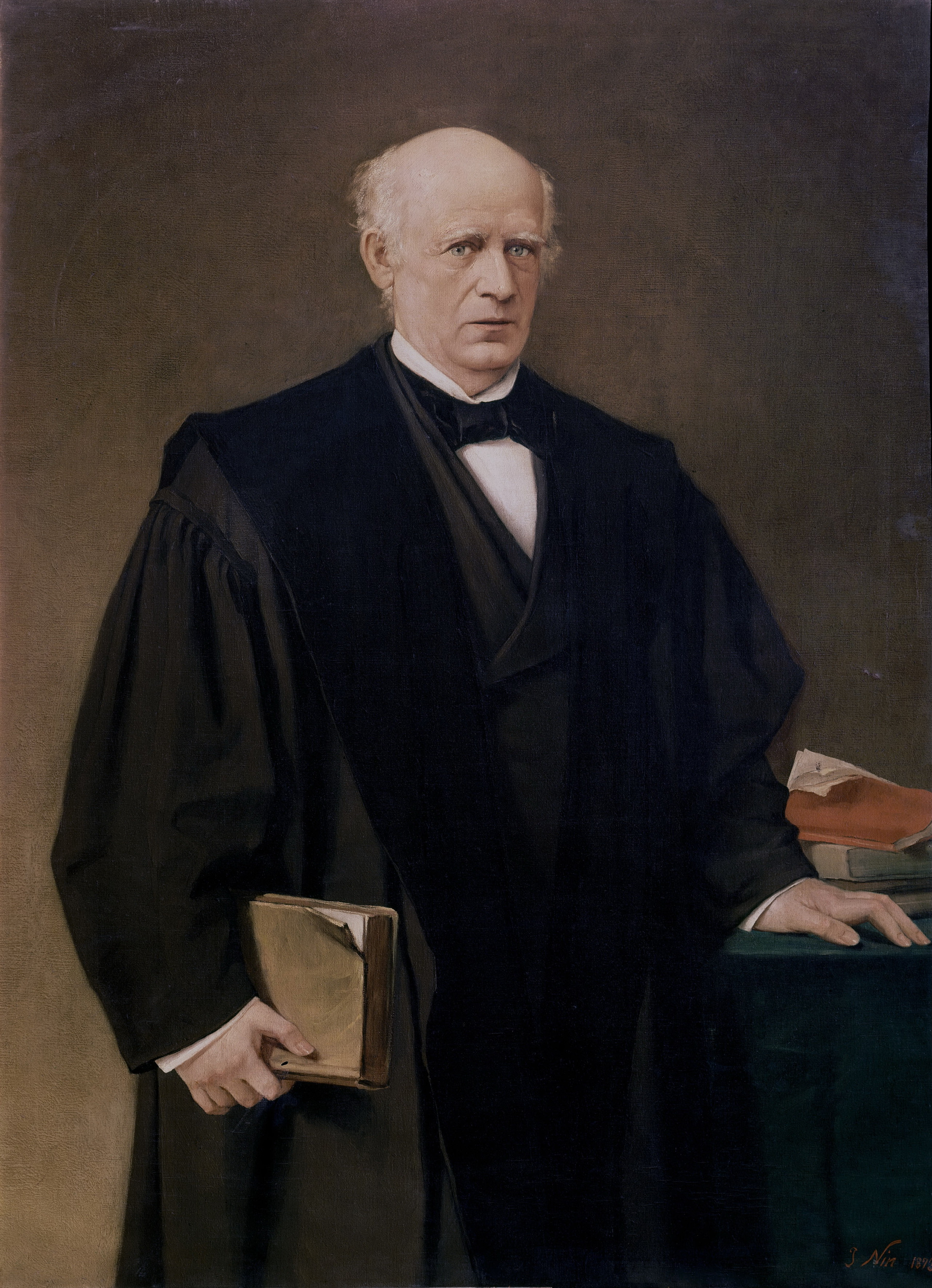
Pascual Madoz

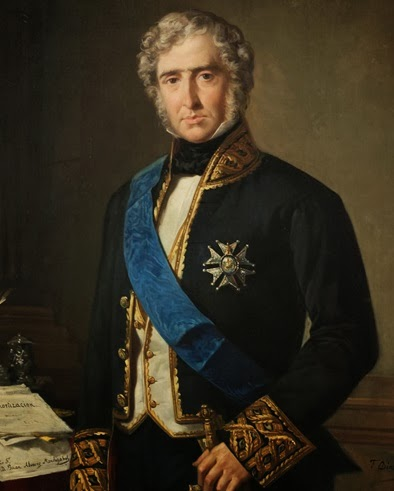
Juan Álvarez Mendizabal

Political reforms, carried out between 1833 and 1872 by moderate liberals such as De la Rosa, Cea Bermudez and Baldomero Espartero, as well as the government formed after "La Gloriosa", left Carlists and other traditional circles in a weakened position. The expropriations of ecclesiastic property carried out by Mendizábal (1836), followed by those of Espartero (1841) and Pascual Madoz (1855), were considered an attack on the Catholic Church and the nobility. Many nobles and Church lost real estate, which in turn was sold to high-ranking Liberals, contributing to unrest among those two important parts of Spanish society. However, the Church and the nobility were not the only important groups to feel threatened by the advance of new bourgeois liberalism—in both its economic and political forms. The drive for Spanish centralization (a rising Spanish nationalism) collided with long-running sources of authority other than the Spanish centralist constitution based in Madrid.

Institutions specific to certain territories, such as the fueros of the Basque Country, were removed by the liberal 1812 Constitution proclaimed in Cádiz, but were largely restored on the installation of Ferdinand VII of Spain to the Spanish throne in 1814. The conflict over home rule in the Basque Country (Basque Provinces and Navarre) was an important point of confrontation. Catalonia and Aragon had lost their specific institutions and laws during and after the War of the Spanish Succession due to the Nueva Planta decrees of 1707–1716, and wanted to win them back. Carlists upheld these former institutions during the two major Carlist wars, resulting in Catalonia and the Basque Country becoming the epicentres of fighting.

Finally, the constant political unrest during the reign of Isabel II, caused by numerous changes in government and the discontent of army officers sent to fight the unsuccessful Hispano-Moroccan War, convinced many traditionalists to favor an armed uprising to restore their lost privileges. After Isabel II was overthrown in 1868 by the generals Prim, Topete and Serrano, the resulting search for a new king resulted in the coronation of the Italian prince Amadeo I, who was supported by the moderate liberals. However, this decision was not welcomed by the Carlists, who elevated their leader Carlos VII to the position of claimant to replace the foreign king. Once again, Spain appeared to be on the brink of another fight for the crown between two declared enemies, but was actually hiding a more complex array of political goals and tensions.

=== Spain's finances at the outbreak of war and during the war ===
Prior to the war, the Spanish government struggled to balance its finances. The Treasury's leeway in 1871 was virtually non-existent. It was unable to buy gold or silver to earn solvency because it would require further loan requests from international financiers, either the House of Rothschild or Paribas. Under Amadeo I, the Treasury received a new loan of 143,876,515 pesetas. 72.34% of the loan was provided by the Rothschild's Houses of Paris and London, for which Alphonse Rothschild and his Spanish agent Ignacio Bauer were awarded the Great Cross of Charles III. However, the loan only briefly patched the financial gaps. Soon, the Treasury required another loan to cover the staggering public debt.

Successive Spanish governments during La Gloriosa attempted to combat financial woes by making new loan requests to pay back existing debt, accepting ever-higher interest rates. At the outbreak of the Third Carlist War in 1872, half of the Spanish Treasury's overall revenue was destined to pay interest on public debt, with rates as high as 22.6%. At any moment, the government could officially declare bankruptcy.

The House of Rothschild, a major beneficiary of this arrangement, soon lost hope of a recuperation of the Spanish finances, and refused to engage in any further major operations. The government turned to Paribas for new loans, which agreed to a loan of 100 million francs, signed in September 1872, six months after the outbreak of the Third Carlist War. However, in February 1873, after the abdication of Amadeo I, the First Spanish Republic was proclaimed, prompting the collapse of political and economic relations between France and the new Spanish republic.

The Rothschilds and Ignacio Bauer came back to Spain in November 1873. They found the situation of public finances so ruinous that they avoided embarking in any financial operations. The Spanish government took emergency measures aimed at collecting the funds necessary for their campaign against the Carlist outbreak in the north, some of which broke the boundaries of what could be ethical and economically viable.

In 1874, after General Serrano's military victory in Bilbao, Alphonse Rothschild wrote to his cousins in London:

The fall of the Carlists will be a great victory for the government... [However,] it would be a better victory to discard all this cancer of financiers that devour the country. That does not seem very probable though, and soon there will be no wealth in Spain. It is not really in our interest to associate with this looting more or less legal.

== War ==
The most important fronts of the war were the Basque Provinces and Navarre and the Eastern Front (Valencia, Alicante, Maestrat, Catalonia). Other minor fronts included Albacete, Cuenca, and Castilla La Mancha

=== Opposing plans ===
==== Carlist battle dispositions ====
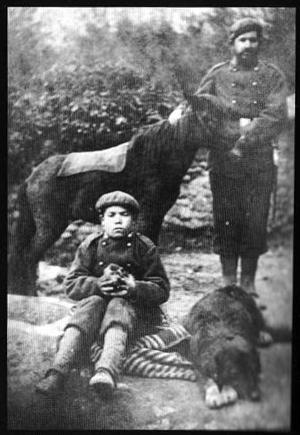
Carlist horseman with his son

As in previous Carlist Wars, the Carlists focused on raising war parties commanded by provisional commanders. These war parties would carry out irregular warfare, focusing on guerrilla or partisan activities, attacking telegram posts, railways, outposts using hit and run tactics. The Carlists tried to avoid large cities such as Bilbao or San Sebastian, because they were not powerful enough to commit to the siege and capture of such cities. Instead, they showed great skill in attacking undefended towns or isolated outposts, employing their knowledge of the terrain to their benefit.

In addition to guerilla parties, there were also several Carlist armies operating in the main theaters of the war under the command of Carlos VII's most trusted officers. These armies were composed of royalist volunteers which were united under the Carlist banner, forming regular infantry, cavalry and artillery units. The real strength of these forces, however, was questionable due to the lack of military training and discipline among the volunteers. Carlist forces lacked a defined supply line, resulting in a constant lack of horses, ammunition, and weapons. The weapons they actually received were often obsolete. Finally, Carlist forces were severely limited in mobility because they were unable to use the government-held railway network. These handicaps put Carlists at a severe disadvantage in conventional warfare. As such, Carlists attempted to avoid direct confrontation with the Liberals, and instead relied on guerrilla warfare to achieve their goals.

==== Liberals' plans ====
In response to Carlist weaknesses, the Liberals planned to conduct a pacification war to drive the Carlists into a direct confrontation where the Liberals' superior training, equipment and leadership would prove decisive. These advantages included the control of the railway system, which enabled the transport of troops and supplies from one critical sector to another within days, the experienced troops and officers of the regular Spanish army, the support of large cities such as Bilbao, and superior weapons and manpower. These advantages were, however, somewhat negated by the political instability of the government and the lack of available resources, such as financing, to suppress the Carlist uprising.

The guerrilla attacks carried out by the Carlists were challenging for the Liberals to deal with because of the Carlists' ability to use the terrain to their benefit. All the aforementioned Liberal advantages were largely irrelevant in this kind of warfare, putting both sides on similar footing. However, the Carlist emphasis on guerilla warfare restricted the fighting to specific areas of Spain, limiting the Carlist range of action. Regardless, the suppression of Carlist guerrillas was a hazardous and costly task that required enormous amounts of manpower and resources that, in the first stages of the war, the Liberals were unable to provide. Only with the stabilization of the government under King Alfonso XII in 1874, were the Liberals able to start turning the tide of the war in their favor.

=== Outbreak of the hostilities ===
The Carlists' plans called for a general uprising across Spain, hoping to gain recruits among the least content groups of the Spanish population. On April 20 Carlos VII, the Carlist pretender, appointed General Rada as the commander-in-chief of what would become the Carlist army. After this, plans for a general uprising were established, and April 21 was set as the opening day of the uprising.

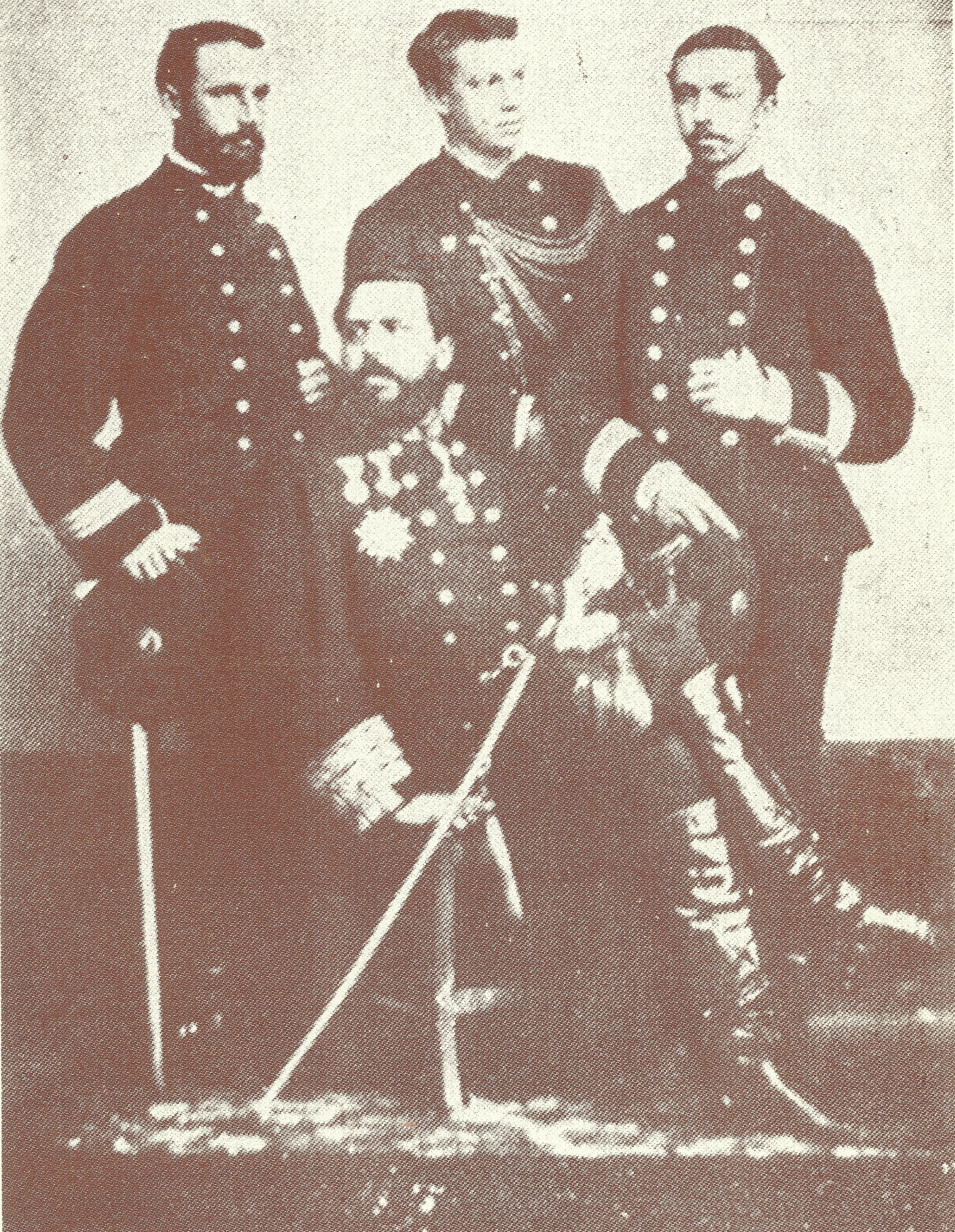
The Italian Bourbons in the Carlist War. Standing, left to right: Robert I of Parma, Prince Henry, Count of Bardi, Alfonso, Count of Caserta. Seated: Charles VII of Spain.

In response to the uprising, thousands of sympathetic volunteers, most without training and some without weapons, gathered in Orokieta-Erbiti (Oroquieta-Erbiti), north of Navarre, awaiting Carlos's arrival. As in Navarre, groups in Biscay also rose in arms against the government on the same day. Several raiding parties carried out guerrilla activities across Catalonia (under the command of generals Tristany, Savalls and Castells), Castile, Galicia, Aragon, Navarre, Gipuzkoa,... Arriving from France on May 2, Carlos VII himself crossed the Bidasoa River from France into Spain, and took command of his forces in Orokieta. However, a quick counterattack of 1,000 government troops led by General Moriones assaulted the Carlist camp in Orokieta during the night of May 4, forcing Carlos VII to retreat to France. Fifty Carlists were killed and over 700 were taken prisoner. As a result, the Carlists in the Basque Provinces were left disorganized for nearly the rest of the year. The Battle of Orokieta threatened to end the Third Carlist war almost as soon as it began.

The government's victory at Orokieta was a huge setback for the Carlists, but the war was not yet ended. Following their defeat at Orokieta, Carlists from Biscay, under the leadership of Fausto de Urquizu, Juan E. de Orúe and Antonio de Arguinzóniz, laid down their arms and surrendered, signing the Conveno de Amorebieta with General Serrano in exchange for a general indult and the possibility of escaping to France or of being incorporated into the national army.

However, in other areas of Spain, such as in Castile, Navarre, Catalonia, Aragon and Gipuzkoa, Carlist parties remained active, engaging government forces in heavy fighting across the area. Though the Carlists suffered a setback in the Basque Provinces, they were far from beaten and still posed a serious threat to the government. Furthermore, the arrangement signed in Amorebieta was rejected by both sides; Serrano was forced to leave his post, while Carlists denounced those who surrendered as traitors.

Meanwhile, in Catalonia, the uprising started earlier than Carlos VII had expected. Seventy men led by Joan Castell revolted and started raising supporters to form new war parties. The command post was assumed by Rafael Tristany until Carlos VII replaced him with the Infante Alfonso, Carlos's own brother. Several efforts were made to form a common military structure during the summer of 1872 but were unsuccessful until the arrival of the Alfonso in December 1872. At the same time, Carlist Pascual Cucala gained popular support in the Maestrat. With the arrival of the infant Alfonso and the reactivation of the war parties, Carlists were able to muster 3,000 men in Catalonia, 2,000 in Valencia, and 850 in Alicante.

=== The Carlist advance ===
With the failure of the uprising in the Basque Provinces and Navarre and the escape of Carlos VII to France, Carlist forces regrouped and reformed themselves for the next strike. All high-ranking officials were removed and replaced with new ones, including General Dorregaray who replaced General Rada as the Commander-in-Chief of the Carlist forces in the Basque Country. A new date was established for another uprising, which would start on December 18, 1872. With the intention of supporting the uprising, small cadres of trained officers entered Spain to create a Carlist Army in November 1872. New war parties were raised during this period, such as the one famously led by priest Manuel Santa Cruz. The second Carlist uprising was successful, resulting in the growth of Carlist forces in the first months of 1873. In February, the Carlist army numbered around 50,000 men on all fronts.

Carlist uprisings and controlled areas (red) across Spain during 1874

==== 1873 ====
===== Basque Provinces and Navarre =====
In February, after the abdication of King Amadeo I and the proclamation of the First Spanish Republic, General Dorregaray arrived to lead the Carlist army in the Basque Country, starting a campaign against government forces. At May 5, Carlist forces under the command of Dorregaray and Rada won an important victory at Eraul (Navarre), inflicting heavy casualties on a government army led by General Navarro, taking many prisoners. Three months later, Carlos VII entered the Basque Provinces, and in August, Carlist forces captured the city of Estella, establishing their capital and a provisional government under the leadership of Carlos VII.

The Carlist advance continued with the inconclusive battle of Mañeru, where both sides claimed victory over the other. One month later, government general Moriones attempted an assault on Estella, defended by the Carlist general Joaquin Elio, but was repulsed with heavy casualties in the nearby town of Montejurra. Although the battle was inconclusive, both sides claimed victory once again. Estella would remain as a Carlist stronghold until 1876. Combined, the battles of Mañeru and Montejurra led to the victory of Belabieta near Villabona in Gipuzkoa, reaffirming the Carlist cause in the surrounding areas, and strengthening their army and morale.

===== Eastern Front =====
Unlike the situation in the Basque Provinces and Navarre, the Carlist cause in Catalonia, Aragon, Maestrat and Valencia had been successful since the initial uprising in 1872. The arrival of the Infante Alfonso to take command in December 1872 strengthened the Carlist cause, but the work of other Carlist leaders such as Marco de Bello, who added more men to the cause by organizing several Carlist battalions and the Compañias del Pilar in Aragon, was also valuable. The first major encounter between the opposing armies was at Alpens on July 9, when a government column, led by Jose Cabrinety, was ambushed by Carlist forces under Francisco Savalls. In the ensuing slaughter, Cabrinety was killed, and his column of 800 men were either killed or captured by Carlists. Another important clash occurred at Bocairente on December 22, when a government force commanded by General Valeriano Weyler was attacked by a numerically superior Carlist force led by Jose Santes. Driven back in the initial stage of the fight, Weyler was able to emerge victorious by leading an effective counter-attack which routed Carlist forces.

==== 1874 ====
===== Basque Provinces and Navarre =====
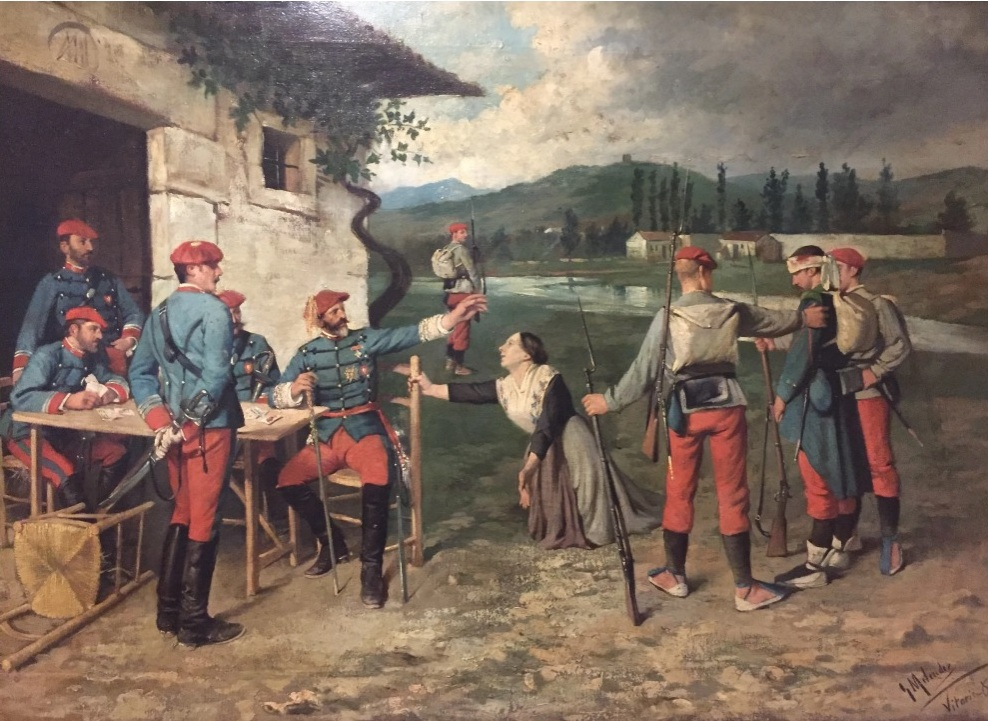
war by Meléndez y Conejo

1874 would be the turning point of the war in this region, marking the limit of the Carlist advance with the failure of the siege of Bilbao and the battles near Estella. Carlists, encouraged by their recent successes and the instability of the republican government, decided to attempt a critical blow on the government by laying siege to the important city of Bilbao. At the same time, a strong Carlist force was ordered to Gipuzkoa to secure the region, which it finally did after capturing Tolosa on February 28. The siege of Bilbao would last from February 21, 1874, until May 2, 1874, and was the turning point of the Third Carlist war in the Basque Provinces and Navarre, with brutal fighting between both sides for possession of the city.

====== Siege of Bilbao ======
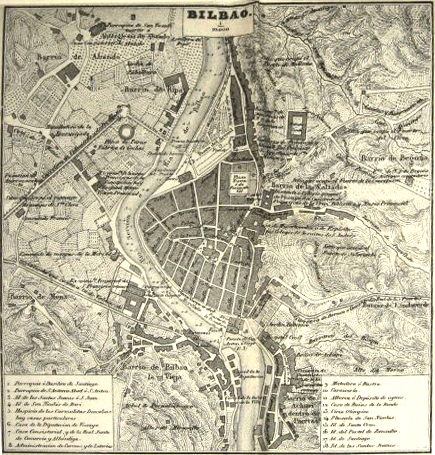
Bilbao in the mid-19th century

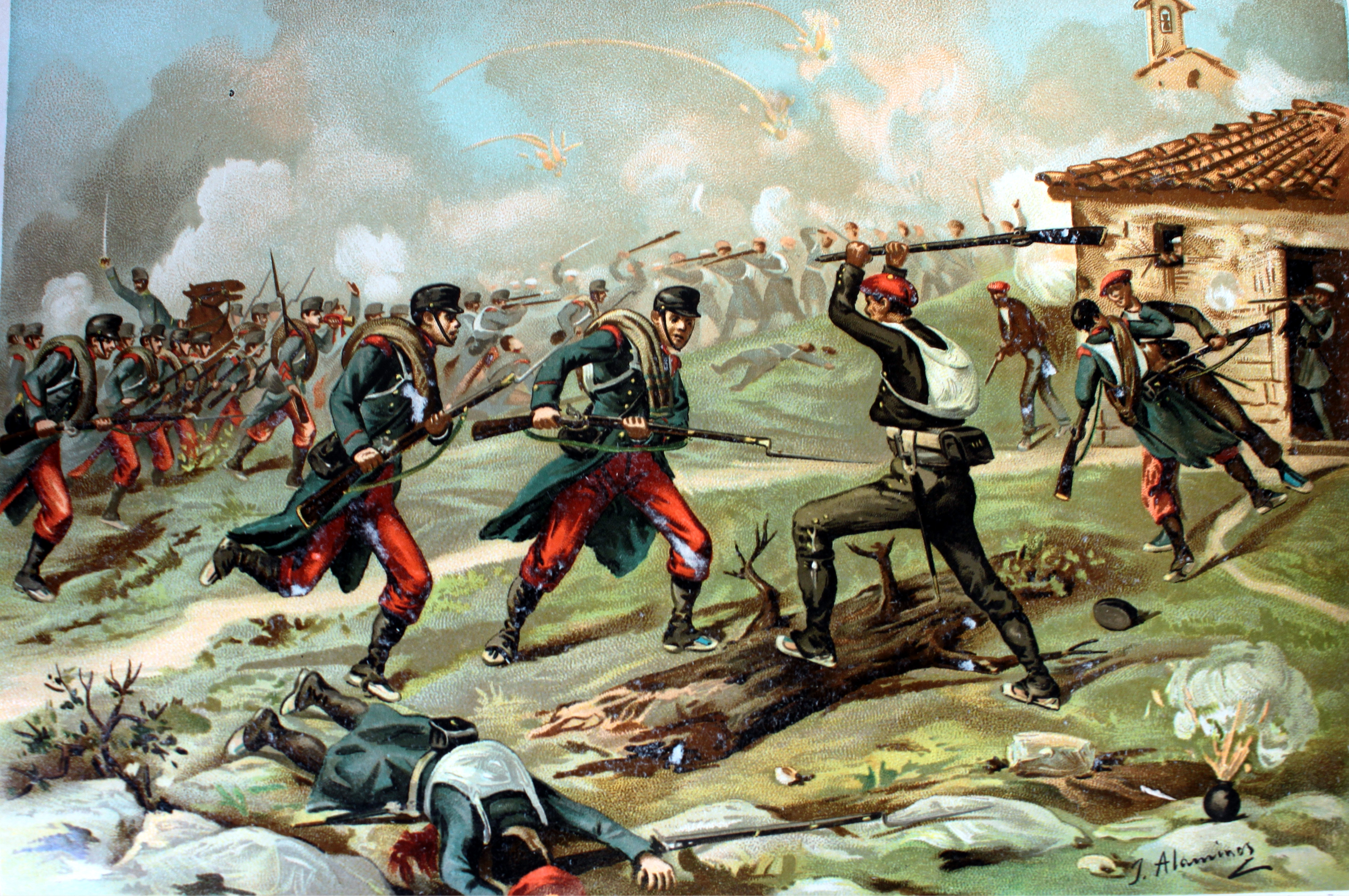
The battle of San Pedro Abanto in 1874

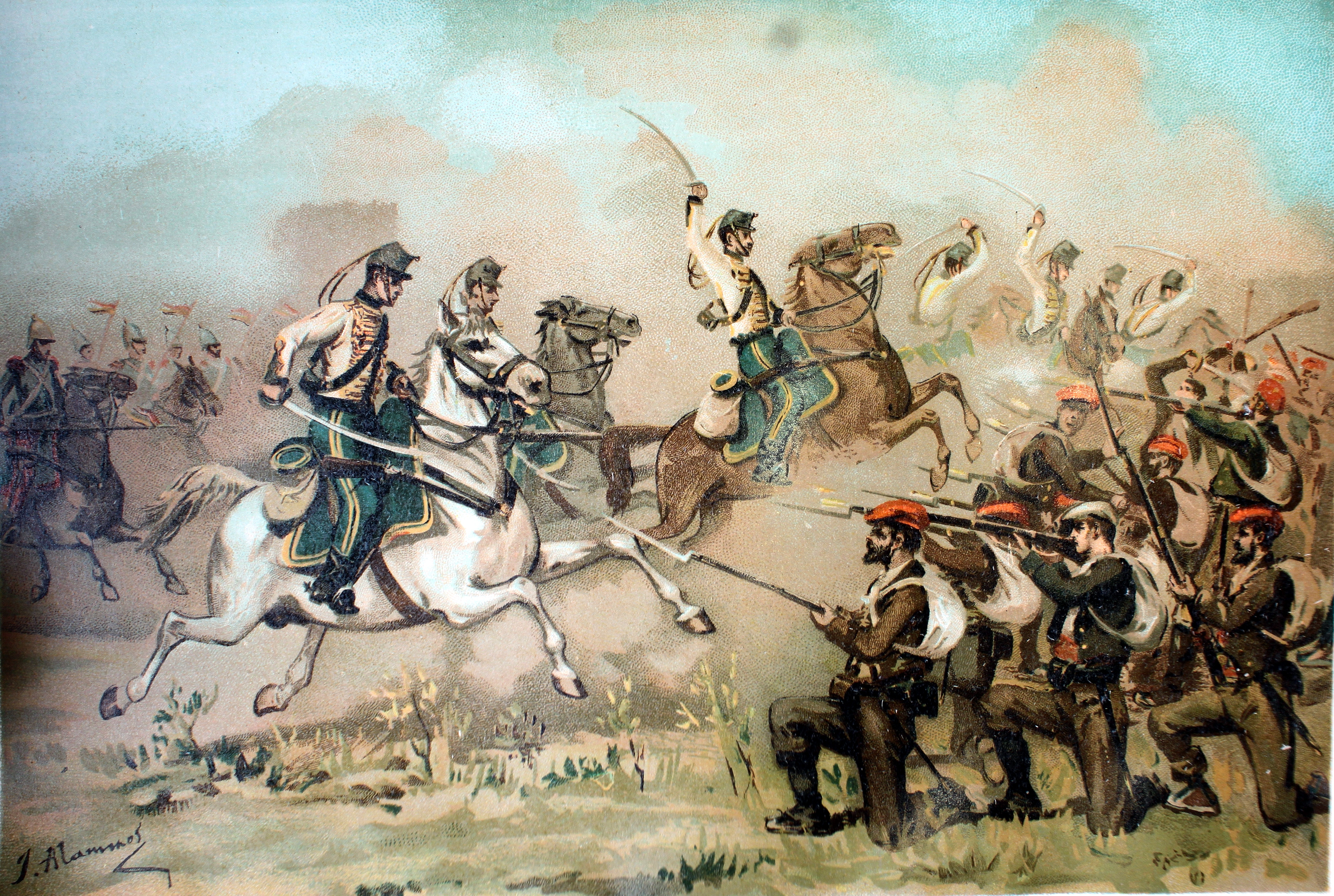
Cavalry charge in 1874

The Carlist siege of Bilbao began on February 21, 1874, with the entrenchment of the Carlists in the hills around Bilbao, and the cutting-off of the government supply line and communications along the Ibaizabal River. Carlist besiegers, led by Joaquin Elio and Carlos VII himself, numbered around 12,000 men, and faced 1,200 government forces in addition to citizens of Bilbao recruited to serve as auxiliaries. Bombardment of the city began the same day, with Carlist artillery opening fire from their positions in the hills near Bilbao. The initial objectives were civilian structures such as food stores, bakeries and markets which provided food to the besieged citizens. Trying to undermine the determination and willingness of the citizens to resist, the Carlists continued with the bombardment until mid-April, when the attempts of lifting the siege by the government army under Serrano forced Carlists to divert attacks to the liberating army and cease the bombardment of the city.

Government commanders, determined to lift the siege and liberate Bilbao, launched a counteroffensive. On February 24, Marshal Serrano sent General Moriones with a relief force of 14,000 men. Carlist besiegers under the command of Nicolas Ollo, entrenched near the town of Somorrostro, repelled the attackers and inflicted heavy casualties; 1,200 government troops were killed, and many more were wounded. As the assault was halted, Moriones was removed from command due to mental instability. Another attempt was made between March 25–27. Serrano took command of 27,000 men and 70 pieces of artillery and attacked the town of Somorrostro once again. Joaquin Elio, the Carlist commander in Somorrostro, had 17,000 men able to repel the attack. After three days of heavy fighting around Carlist positions, government forces were driven back. The siege was finally lifted with a renewed offensive on May 1, which succeeded in turning the Carlist flank, forcing them to retreat. Serrano entered Bilbao the next day. By the time government forces liberated Bilbao, the city on the brink of surrender of starvation due to food shortages caused by the Carlist siege.

====== Government advance against Estella ======
With the Carlist siege of Bilbao broken, Marshal Serrano sent General Manuel Gutiérrez de la Concha to lead an attack against the Carlist capital of Estella. Defended by Generals Torcuato Mendiri and Dorregaray, the garrison of Estella took positions in the hills on the approach to the town, near Abárzuza, repelling government forces after fighting which lasted from June 25 to June 27. Half-starved and tired by the long march, government forces were unable to defeat the entrenched Carlists. After suffering over 1,000 casualties, with Gutiérrez among them, the government forces were routed by Mendiri. By September 24, Carlists still held the Basque Provinces and most of Navarre outside of their capitals and kept a 24,000-strong army despite being forced to lift the siege of Bilbao. Government forces made more attempts to take the Carlist capital of Estella despite their earlier failures at Abárzuza. The next attack was a diversionary attack, led by Moriones, southeast of the town of Oteiza on August 11. Government forces were able to defeat Carlists under the command of Mendiri, gaining a small tactical victory with heavy casualties.

===== Eastern Front =====
As it had been in the Basque Provinces and Navarre, 1874 would be the turning point of the war. It began with a small Carlist defeat in Caspe, Aragon, where a government force under Colonel Eulogio Despujol surprised Manuel Marco de Bello's forces in the town of Caspe, defeating them and forcing to flee in disorder. 200 Carlists were taken prisoner during this surprise attack. However, Carlists, strengthened by reinforcements sent by the Infante Alfonso from Vallès in Tarragona, were able to establish a small state in the Maestrat, centered around the town of Cantavieja. They repelled several attacks on Cantavieja but finally capitulated after a siege.

In the meantime, Carlist forces in Catalonia were extremely active in Girona and Tarragona. In March, a Carlist force commanded by Francesc Savalls laid siege to Olot (Girona) and frustrated the attempts to relieve the town by defeating a relief army led by Ramon Nouvilas at Castellfollit de la Roca on March 14. The battle ended with the capture of 2,000 men and Nouviles himself. Olot capitulated two days after the battle. Immediately, Catalan Carlists set their capital at Olot, forming a new government in San Joan de les Abadeses with Rafael Tristany as head of state. The main objective of the government was to establish a political administration of the territories held by Carlist forces in Catalonia. At Tarragona, Infante Alfonso started gathering his forces at Tortosa. Seeing an opportunity to gain the initiative, Republican Colonel Eulogio Despujol, victorious over Carlists at Caspe, attacked a Carlist stronghold led by Colonel Tomas Segarra at Gandesa on June 4, taking it and inflicting 100 casualties on the Carlists. This success, however, would be irrelevant in the outcome of the war, as Infante Alfonso gathered a 14,000-strong Carlist army and marched to Cuenca one month later. Cuenca, 136 kilometers from Madrid, capitulated after two days of siege and was brutally sacked, but a Republican counter-attack defeated the disordered Carlists, who withdrew beyond the Ebro River. In October, the splitting of Carlist armies of central Spain and of Catalonia, as dictated by Carlos VII, combined with the rivalries between commanders Savalls and Infante Alfonso, forced the latter to give up his command and to leave Spain.

=== Stalemate in the Basque Country and the fall of Catalonia ===
==== 1875 ====
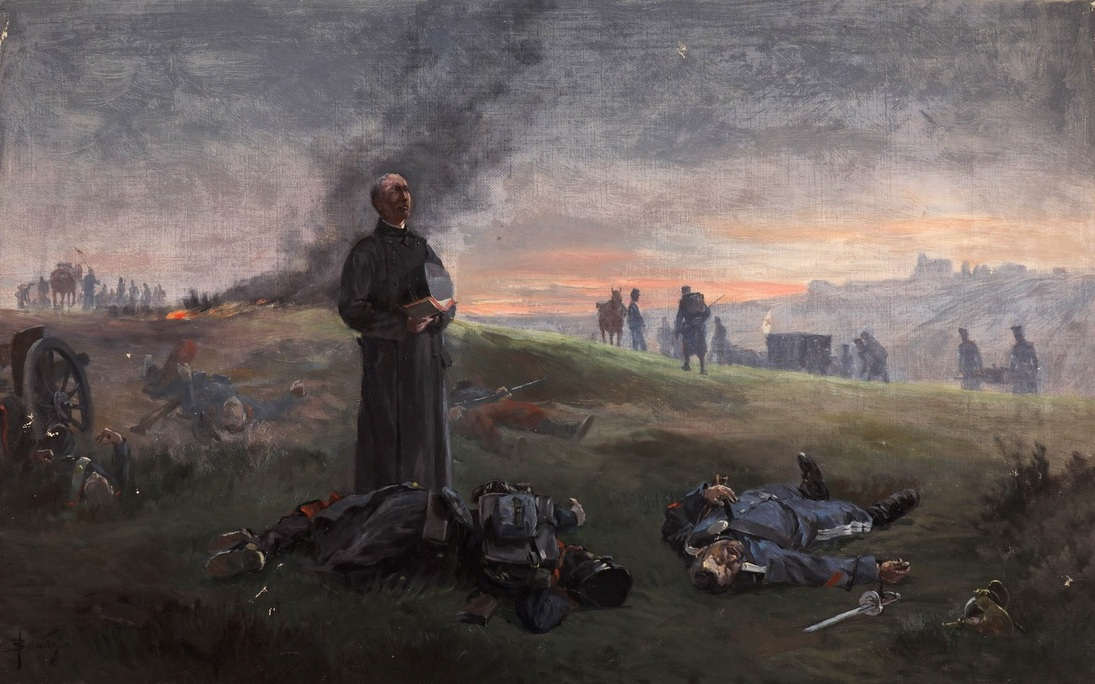
war by Banda y Pineda

The pronounciamiento of General Arsenio Martinez de Campos and Brigadier Daban proclaimed the restoration of the monarchy on December 29, 1874, enthroning Alfonso XII, the son of the deposed Queen Regnant Isabel II, as King. A subsequent manifesto, written by former prominent Carlist leader Ramon Cabrera, announced his support of the new monarch, severely undermining the Carlist cause. Several Carlist leaders, such as Savalls, Mendiri, Dorregaray and many others, were put on trial for disloyalty by fellow Carlists or removed from command in 1875. From this point onward, Carlists made few advances and instead fought to defend the holdings gained between 1873 and 1874, setting the basis for the end of the war.

===== Basque Country =====
"We know without a doubt that triggered by the extermination policy of the Alfonsino party and the unswerving faith of our brothers, the Basque-Navarrese Country would rather proclaim independence than kneel under sir Alfonso, should sir Charles VII surrender in the battlefield shrouded in his glorious flag."
Weekly periodical La bandera carlista, 19/09/1875

The restoration of the monarchy and internal dissensions promoted by the royal sympathizer, Ramon Cabrera, in the Carlist ranks proved fatal for the Carlist cause. Many high-ranking Carlist officers defected and joined the government army, spreading mistrust and suspicion at the Carlist headquarters. Although shaken by recent events, Carlists demonstrated that they had not been defeated yet. On February 3, General Torcuato Mendiri was able to surprise a government column near Lácar, east of Estella, recently captured by government forces. In the subsequent battle, the Carlists captured some pieces of artillery, 2,000 rifles and 300 prisoners. 1,000 men died during the battle, most of whom were government troops. The Carlists missed an opportunity for more decisive success when King Alfonso XII, who was traveling with the column, escaped capture. Once again, the Carlists showed their effectiveness in ambushes.

The defeat at Lácar did not stop the Spanish government, however, which launched another offensive in the summer of 1875. This time, the central government's force, advancing into Navarre under General Jenaro de Quesada's orders, encountered a Carlist army led by General José Pérula at Treviño on July 7. General Tello, Quesada's subordinate, won a decisive victory over the Carlist army, forcing it to retreat in disarray. Soon afterwards, Quesada entered Vitoria unopposed and triumphant. Government forces continued their offensive during summer and fall, with two armies encroaching on Carlist territory, one led by General Quesada and the other by General Martinez Campos. Carlists responded with a scorched-earth tactic, burning crops and retreating from areas they could not hold against the government's advance. A change in Carlist leadership, with the dismissal of Mendiri and the naming of the Count of Caserta as commander-in-chief, did not stabilize the situation. Even with 48 infantry battalions, 3 cavalry regiments, 2 engineer battalions and 100 pieces of artillery under his command, the Count was not able to bring government advance to a halt.

===== Eastern Front =====
After the defeat at Cuenca and the renunciation of Infante Alfonso's command, the Carlist cause in Catalonia started to collapse. The process was accelerated by the government's offensive that took place in Olot in March, laying siege to Seo de Urgel, which was taken on August. The fighting in Catalonia lasted until November 19, when it was considered "pacified" and free of Carlist parties.

=== End of the war ===
==== 1876 ====
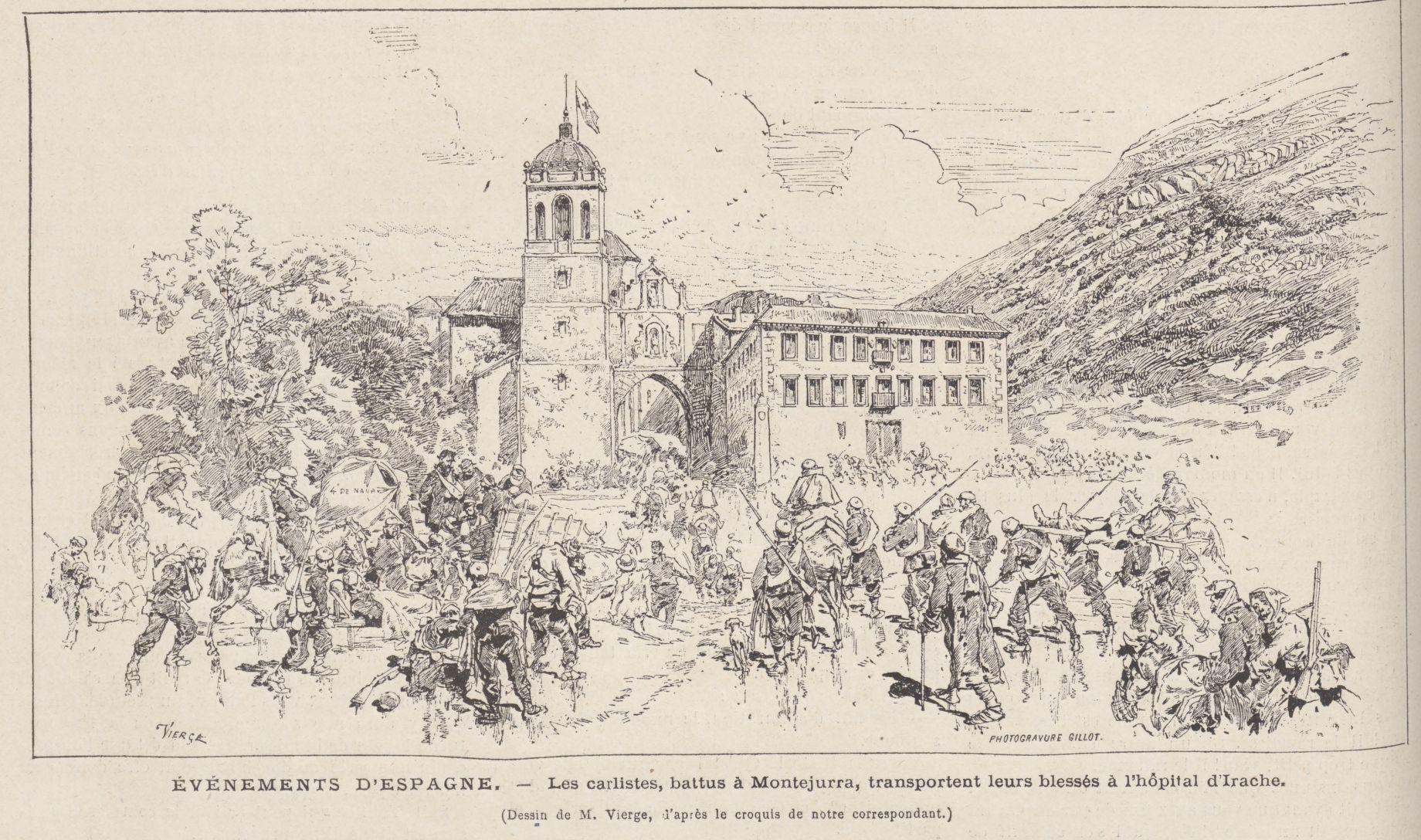
The Carlists, defeated in Montejurra, carried their wounded to the hospital of the Irache monastery

Having lost the war in Catalonia, and faced with the advance of the two government armies led by Generals Martinez Campos and Quesada, Carlists began to prepare their last stand in the Basque Provinces and Navarre. The final battle of the war would be fought near Estella. Government forces, under General Fernando Primo de Rivera, advanced with the intention to capture Estella in February 1876 in a final offensive to put an end to the Carlist uprising. Carlist forces, this time under General Carlos Calderón, fortified themselves at Montejurra, a nearby mountain, and built a powerful stronghold.

The battle began with a government attack on February 17, which forced Carlist soldiers to withdraw from their defensive positions. The defense inflicted many casualties on government forces, but it did not change the course of the battle. An estimate sets the number of Basque Carlist volunteers at 35,000, while Spanish troops numbered at 155,000. On February 19, government forces drove through the weak Carlist forces protecting Estella, taking the city. The loss of their capital convinced the remaining Carlist forces that their cause was now lost, and they began to head to exile. Carlos VII was among them, leaving Spain on February 28, the same day that Alfonso XII entered Pamplona with a 200,000-strong army, ending the Third, and final, Carlist war.

== Aftermath ==
The end of the conflict marked the dawn of a new political system and a new social reality that affected the entirety of Spain. The new constitutional monarchy, established in 1876, was created amidst much violence and little negotiation. The new regime based its power on the military and the paramilitary police force, which were solidified during the 19th century through the defense of the centralist state and the stamping-out of popular uprisings. Thus, the new regime guaranteed the preservation and extension of the interests of Spain's political and economic oligarchy, i.e. the agrarian aristocracy and the industrial bourgeoisie.

A new political ideology of Spanish Nationalism also emerged, linked to the need for a modern Spain. This ideology pivoted on the premises of centralization and homogeneity. As pointed out by Adam Shubert, this idea was rejected by many Spanish citizens, laying the foundations for a contentious "national problem" that persists in Spain to this day.

=== Abolition of self-government ===
The relentless centralizing drive of the Spanish Crown after the First Carlist War led to the reduction of the autonomy of the Basque institutional and legal system (1839–1841), but it was only after the Third Carlist War that it was virtually wiped out. Of the huge government army occupying Pamplona, 40,000 troops were stationed in the Basque Provinces, where martial law was imposed. The Carlist defeat prompted the end of the secular confederate Basque self-government.

However, in May 1876, pragmatic considerations left the Spanish Prime Minister Antonio Canovas del Castillo with no option but to negotiate with the Basque Provinces. The negotiations, held between government officials and high-ranking Liberal officials of the regional chartered councils, took place behind closed doors, and thus bypassed the Basque representative assemblies, the Juntas Generales.

After a number of heated debates in the Spanish parliament (Note: Out of strong convictions, the Álavan Mateo de Moraza delivered a 6-hour-long speech in defence of home rule before the Spanish parliament.) and closed-doors meetings between the government and the Basque leaders, no agreement was reached. In response, an official Spanish decree was approved on July 21, 1876, by Prime Minister Antonio Canovas del Castillo, which abolished the Basque institutional system of Biscay, Álava, and Gipuzkoa. The decree reduced the Basque province to the status held by Navarre after 1841, and essentially ended Basque home rule. This "Abolition Act" was "a punishment law," as stated by the Chair of the Council of Ministers, and guaranteed "the expansion the Spanish constitutional union to all Spain," as stated by the Prime Minister Canovas. The first article of the law proclaimed:

The duties that the politic[al] Constitution has imposed upon the Spanish people to do...military service when they [are] call[ed] by...law and, to contribute, in proportion of their assets, to the state expenditures, to the inhabitants of the Provinces of Biscay, Gipuzkoa and Álava, just as others of the Nation.

From then on, Basques were forced to enrol in the Spanish military on an individual basis, not in separate groups or corps. Basque soldiers in the Spanish army were often exposed to stressful experiences; many Basques spoke little Spanish and were thus unable to communicate with fellow soldiers.

Navarre was affected by the law, but for the moment, it was spared from further constraints due to the 1841 "Compromise Act" (Ley Paccionada) that had already officially turned the semi-autonomous Kingdom of Navarre into a Spanish province.

=== Basque Economic Agreement ===
The abolition of Basque charters and the requirement for Basques to "contribute in proportion of their assets to the state expenditures" raised the question of how to collect taxes from the Basque Provinces. The Basque Liberal elite, based in the capital cities, initially wanted to retain home rule and their pre-war political status. However, in the midst of military occupation, negotiations between the Canovas government and the Liberal officials of the Basque Provinces resulted in the signing of first Basque Economic Agreement in 1878. Under the new system, Spanish tax collectors would not directly collect contributions from the Basque people. Rather, the newly established Provincial Councils would be responsible for tax collection in their province as they saw fit, and would then remit a portion of the revenues, as decided by the State Treasury, to the central government. Though designed to be provisional, the system is still in use today.

Through this agreement, the Spanish government theoretically diffused the lingering regionalist sentiment, and created a solid basis for both industrial development and political and administrative consolidation of the central government.

=== Industrial expansion in the Basque Country ===
Another consequence of the Carlist defeat and ensuing abolition of the Basque institutional system was the liberalization of the industries in the Basque Provinces, especially in Biscay. The liberalization of the mines, industries and ports attracted many companies, especially British mining companies, that were established in Biscay along with small local societies, such as Ybarra-Mier y Compañía. Large mining companies, such as the Orconera Iron Ore Company Limited and the Societé Franco-Belge des Mines de Somorrostro (the Franco-Belgian Society of Somorrostro Mines), were created, leading to an industrial society based on iron ore mining.

The industrial expansion of Biscay had major consequences. The demographics of the region soon shifted as the rural society evolved into an industrial one. There was marked growth in immigration to Biscay, at first from the rest of the Basque Provinces, but later from all of Spain. Due to the growth of the industrial working class, trade unions were formed and the socialist movement began growing in strength. As a result of the industrialization, Basque identity was plunged into crisis due to the perception that local customs and language were being eroded by the massive wave of immigration from diverse parts of Spain. In combination with the abolition of the remaining Basque government institutions, the industrial expansion in the Basque Country played a major role the emergence of Basque nationalism.

=== Restoration ===
In December 1874, in the midst of the war, Major Martinez Campos proclaimed Alfonso XII as King of Spain through a successful military uprising, ending the First Spanish Republic. Six years after the deposition of Isabel II, Alfonso's mother, the Bourbon dynasty was restored to the Spanish throne.

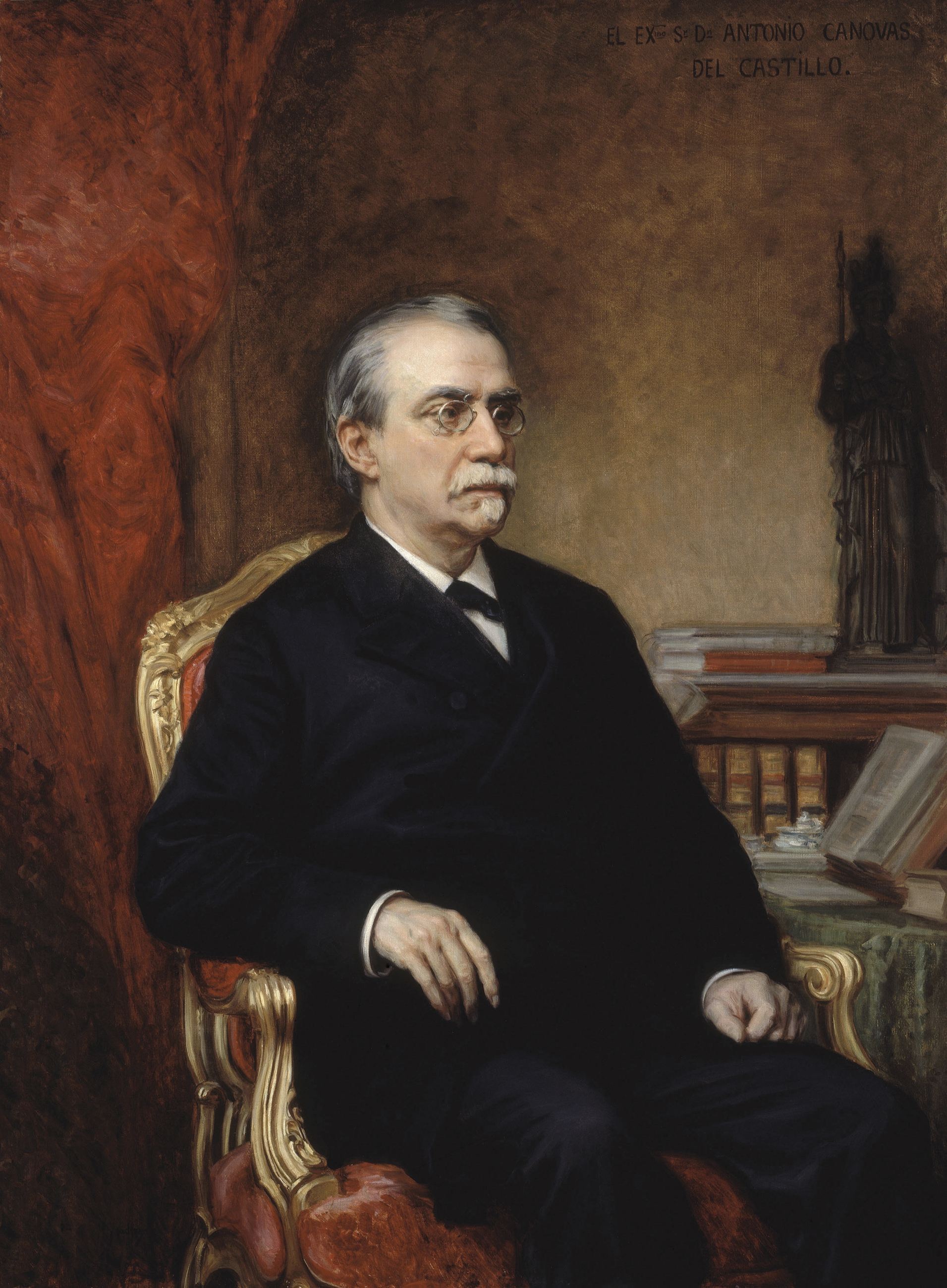
Canovas del Castillo, one of the masterminds of the Restoration and leader of the conservative party

Before the restoration, Antonio Cánovas del Castillo, a prominent political figure in Spain, took the British monarchy and the parliamentary system as models for a potential restoration, attending the Royal Military College, Sandhurst in Britain. There, before the military uprising of 1874, Alfonso XII proclaimed a manifesto, written by Canovas, which advocated monarchy as the only way to end the crisis of the revolutionary period, and which set out the most important ideas of a new Spanish political system.

==== The Constitution of 1876 ====
In the first months of the Restoration, Canovas concentrated the majority of power in his own hands. However, to legitimize his new government, he needed a constitution to regulate and guarantee the new political regime. He and his companions organized elections on the basis of male universal suffrage to form the "cortes constituyentes," and to write a new constitution. It was partially inspired by the Constitution of 1845 but also incorporated some elements of the Constitution of 1869, such as civil rights and liberties. The new constitution announced that:

- The sovereignty of the state would be shared between the monarchy (the king) and the legislature.
- The King would be the major power and he had more executive power than the government.
- The legislature was to be bicameral, elitist, and guaranteed the control of executive power by the privileged minority.
- Some individual rights and freedoms would be introduced, although the latter would be regulated by other laws.
- Catholicism would be the official state religion.

The entrance of Alfonso into Spain and the proclamation of the constitutional monarchy began a long period of political stability founded on conservative values, property, monarchy, and a liberal state. The new system only provided for two parties; all other parties were barred from participating. The Conservative Party, led by Antonio Canovas del Castillo, represented the interests of the landowners, bourgeoisie, Catholic groups, and the aristocracy of the former regime. The Liberal Party, led by Práxedes Mateo Sagasta, represented those who did not accept the new law of the 1876 Constitution, radicals, and groups of moderate republicans. Both parties supported the monarchy.

The government was chosen through a process known as the turno system, agreed upon by Conservative leader Canovas and Liberal leader Sagasta. The ideologically similar Liberal and Conservative parties would decide election results in advance, taking alternating turns serving in government to ensure support for the monarchy and to prevent radical parties from taking power. The parties were unresponsive to voters, and instead relied on electoral fraud and the support of the oligarchy and political bosses (Caciquism) to attain desired results.

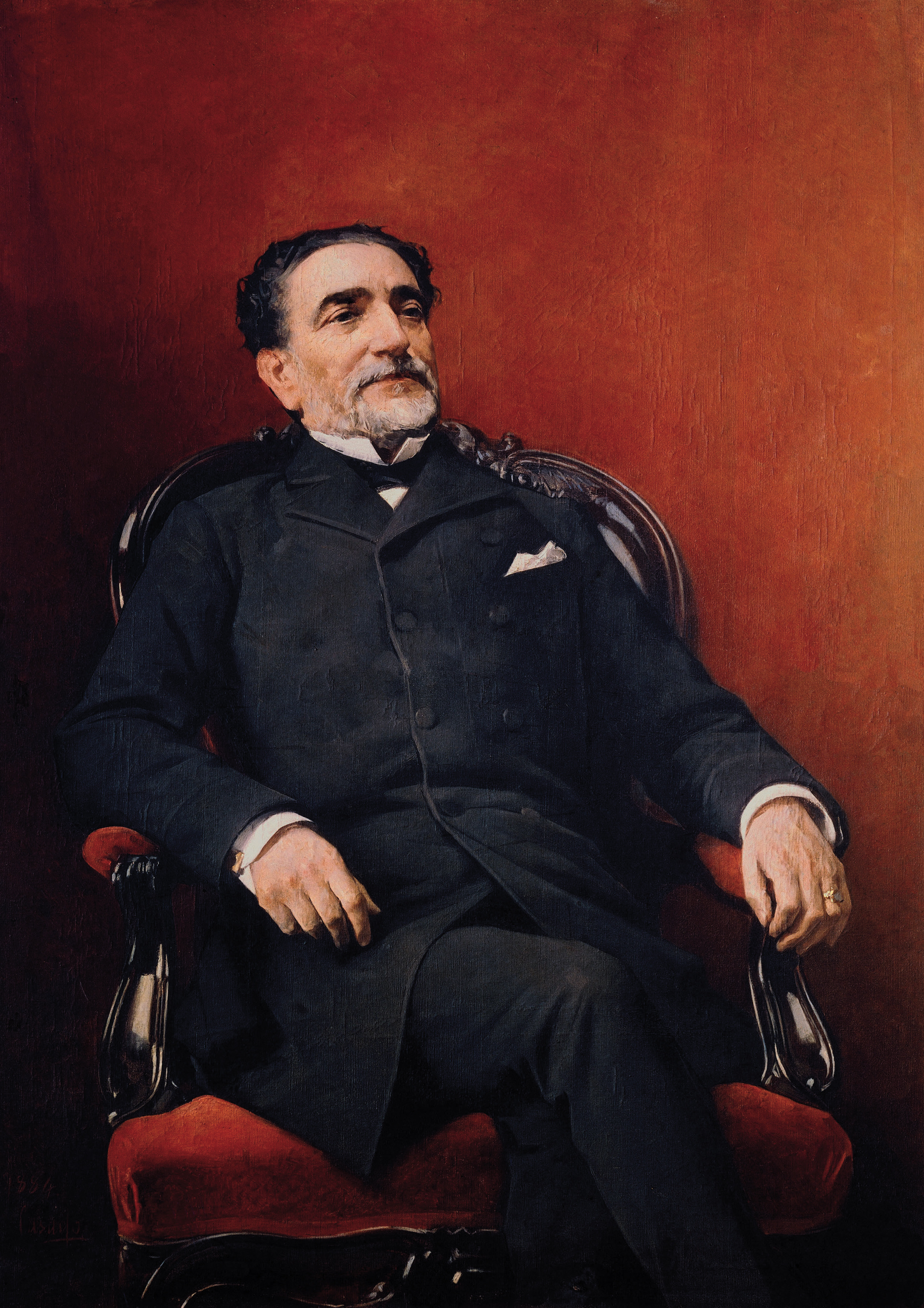
Práxedes Mateo Sagasta, head of the Liberal party

=== Basque nationalism ===
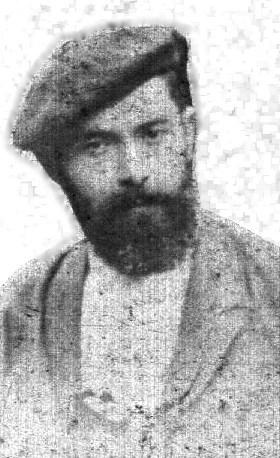
Sabino Arana Goiri, founder of the Basque Nationalist Party

One consequence of the abolition of Basque home rule was an evolution of Carlism into a range of factions, one of which became Basque nationalism. In response to the abolition of the fueros, a movement was created defend the lost Basque native institutional and legal framework and to restore the receding Basque cultural identity, namely Basque language and culture. The 1894 Sanrocada protest in Biscay echoed the 1893–1894 Gamazada popular uprising in Navarre. They sowed the seeds for the formation of the Basque Nationalist Party (EAJ-PNV), founded in 1895, by Sabino Arana, a Basque writer. Arana, commonly seen as the father of Basque nationalism, rejected the Spanish monarchy, and based Basque nationalism on the ideals of Catholicism and the fueros. Such ideals were summarized in the Basque Nationalist Party's motto:

Jaungoikoa eta Lagi zaharra ("God and Tradition").

The Basque Nationalist Party was ideologically conservative, opposing liberalism, industrialization, Spanishness and socialism. However, it attracted diverse personalities concerned with the loss of Basque identity and institutions, such as Ramón de la Sota, a Basque industrialist born in Santander. At the end of the 19th century, the Basque Nationalist Party won its first seats in local and regional councils. Many votes came from the rural areas and the middle class, who were worried by industrialization and the growth of socialism.

Opposing centralism and the new proletarian ideologies, Arana founded the first Basque nationalist political program, which showed a striking resemblance to the Carlist movement. Arana's manifesto Bizkaya por su independencia ("Biscay for its independence") spoke specifically of Biscay, but pointed to a reality beyond the boundaries of each specific district: the Basque country as a whole.

=== Catalan nationalism ===
Catalan nationalism peaked when Spain lost most of its colonies in 1898, at the conclusion of the Spanish-American War. Earlier in the 19th century, however, the Catalan bourgeoisie worked with the central government, and even supported the restoration of the Bourbon dynasty in 1875.

Catalan federalist Valenti Almirall produced one of the earliest formulations of Catalan nationalism, outlined in his 1886 book Lo Catalanisme. He was persuaded of the need to create a new political force separate from Spanish political parties, creating the party Centre Catalá in 1882. Although the party integrated a variety of different political beliefs, its common purpose was the demand for autonomy, or devolution.

The project, however, failed to progress very far. Even during the late 19th century, Catalan nationalism was not strong enough. One section of the moderate bourgeoisie supported Catalanism as a reaction to the liberal and centralist policies of the Spanish government. In this context, Enric Prat de la Riba established the "Lliga de Catalunya" in 1887, defending a traditional Catalan project. In 1891 the Unió Catalanista was founded by the convergence of different political ideas, leading to the first political program of Catalanism known as the Bases de Manresa in 1892. They demanded one regional autonomous power, traditionalist and not liberal (suffrage by census, no references to the knights and freedom...).

== Popular culture ==
Paz en la guerra (Peace in War) (1895), a novel by Miguel de Unamuno, explores the relationship of self and world through the familiarity with death. It is based on his experiences as a child during the Carlist siege of Bilbao in the Third Carlist War. The writer Benito Pérez Galdós also mentions some tales of the Third Carlist War in his books Episodios Nacionales (1872–1912), often showing them as religious bandits and mocking their leaders, who are often referred to as "wild beasts."

The Anglo-Polish novelist Joseph Conrad, originally a merchant seaman, claimed that he had smuggled arms to Spain for the Carlist supporters of Carlos de Borbón y de Austria-Este. An authoritative Conrad scholar Zdzisław Najder reports: ‘A careful reading of "The Tremolino" and The Arrow of Gold reveals that the whole Carlist plot is a sideline, an ornament that does not affect the course of action; its only function seems to be to glamorize and idealize smuggling.’

Part of the film Vacas (1992) is set during the Third Carlist War.

== See also ==
- 1873 Montejurra battle (celebrated each year since)
- Traditionalist Communion – the Carlist political party from 1869 to 1937
- General Marco de Bello's biography (in Spanish)
- Carlist anthem
- Carlist museum of Estella

== Bibliography ==
- The decline of Carlism, Jeremy MacClancy. University of Nevada Press, Reno (USA), 2000, 349 pages.
- A military history of modern Spain: from the Napoleonic era to the war on terror, Wayne H. Bowen, José E. Alvarez. Greenwood Publishing, 2007, 222 pages.
- Ferrer Melchor (1958–1959), Historia del tradicionalismo español, Editorial Católica, Sevilla, vols. 24–27
- Spain in the nineteenth century, Elizabeth Wormeley Latimer. A. C. McClurg & Co, 1907, 441 pages.
- López-Morell, Migule Á. (2015). Rothschild; Una historia de poder e influencia en España. Madrid: Marcial Pons, Ediciones de Historia, S.A. ISBN 978-8415963592.
- Amadeo I: El rey caballero, Villa San Juan. Planeta, Los reyes de España, 1997, 229 pages.
- Carlos VII: Duque de Madrid, Anonymous. Espasa-Calpe, Vidas españolas del siglo XIX, 1929. 263 pages.
- Uriarte, Jose Luis. "El Concierto Económico; Una Visión Personal". El Concierto Económico. Publitas.
- Watson, Cameron (2003). Modern Basque History: Eighteenth Century to the Present. University of Nevada, Center for Basque Studies. ISBN 1877802166.
- La Tercera Guerra Carlista 1872–1876, César Alcalá. Grupo Medusa Ediciones. 33 pages.
- Las Guerras Carlistas, Antonio M. Moral Roncal, Silex, 389 pages.
- España 1808–2008, Raymond Carr, Ariel, 972 pags.
