= Rafael Tristany =

Catalan Carlist leader

Rafael Tristany i Parera
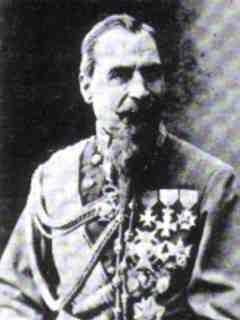
- Rafael Tristany, President of the Diputació General de Catalunya
- Born: 16 May 1814; Ardèvol, Solsonès, Catalonia
- Died: 17 June 1899 (aged 85); Lourdes, Gascony, France
- Military career
- Rank: Count of Avinyó
- Conflicts: First Carlist War, Second Carlist War, Third Carlist War

Rafael Tristany i Parera (born May 16, 1814 in Ardèvol, Solsonès, died June 17, 1899 in Lourdes, Gascony), Count of Avinyó, was one of the main Carlist leaders in Catalonia during the Second Carlist War and the head of the Carlist army in the Principality during the Third Carlist War.

== Biography ==
Born on 16 May 1814, son of Joan Tristany and Teresa Parera at the family farmhouse in Ardèvol. Nephew of the famous Carlist leader Benet Tristany, he participated in the three Carlist uprisings of the 19th century, progressively gaining command responsibilities until reaching the rank of captain general of the Carlist forces in the Principality of Catalonia. As a military man, he was distinguished for his humanitarianism and tactical discipline.

=== First Carlist War ===
At nineteen, he joined the Carlist ranks. During the First Carlist War, he participated in many battles, such as those of El Bruc, Calaf, Tona, the assault on Solsona and others, achieving the rank of lieutenant colonel. He was wounded in the Battle of Biosca (April 1840) and, after the war, remained in hiding.

=== Second Carlist War ===
He fought again in the Second Carlist War and came to command a brigade of 3,000 men with the rank of brigadier (1849); he took Berga and Sallent, captured the garrison of Igualada, surrendered the fort of Prades, and at Avinyó, along with Cabrera, defeated and took prisoner Brigadier Manzano and 700 Isabeline soldiers (November 1848); he entered Cardona by surprise and fought at Pinós. However, after losing the war, he was forced into exile in France (May 1849).

In July 1855, he entered Catalonia again and stayed for nearly a year with a squad of 200 men. In 1861, he offered his services to Francis II of Naples, for whom he fought; he was captured and deported to France.

=== Third Carlist War ===
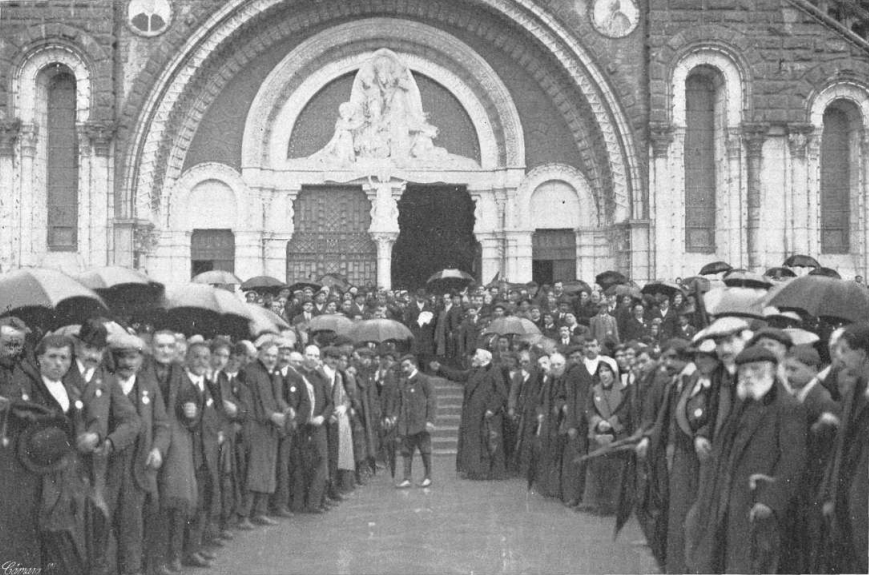
A crowd awaiting Don Jaime during the Jaume pilgrimage to Lourdes on the occasion of Rafael Tristany's remains repatriation (1913).

In May 1872, at the outbreak of the Third Carlist War, he returned to the Principality and was the commander general of Catalonia. He won several battles, forcing the garrisons of Sant Feliu de Pallerols, Sant Hilari Sacalm, Taradell, and Salelles to surrender; defeated the liberal volunteers at la Llacuna and destroyed a column of the civil guard at Sanaüja.

When the Infante Alfonso Carlos of Bourbon took command of Catalonia in 1873, Tristany was appointed commander general of the provinces of Lleida and Tarragona and achieved victories at la Pobla de Segur, Gerri de la Sal, where he secured the surrender of the garrison, and again at Sanaüja, where he took prisoner a squadron of Calatrava Lancers and over a hundred volunteers. He participated in the assault and capture of Igualada and the victory at Casserres.

On the night of 8–9 January 1874, he assaulted and took Vic, with 70 defenders and 10 Carlists killed, according to Tristany himself. The following night, the Collformic massacre of fleeing liberals was carried out by Carlist Colonel Ramon Vila i Colomer, known as Vila de Viladrau. According to Vila, 97 were killed in combat, although oral tradition speaks of 110, claiming the men were executed in cold blood.

Tristany also took Castellciutat, Manresa and el Vendrell, and when Alfonso de Borbó moved to the center, he became head of the Carlists of Catalonia, with 12,000 infantry and 500 cavalry.

He swore the fueros at Olot when the Diputació General de Catalunya was officially restored on 1 October 1874.

In March 1875, he moved north of the Peninsula as head of the military household of pretender Carlos de Borbón y Austria-Este and attended the Siege of Getaria. He was appointed captain general of Catalonia (1875) in a last attempt to revive the Carlist cause there, but the war was already lost. Shortly after, he moved to France, where he married and settled finally in Lourdes, where he ended his life.

=== Death and honors ===
He died in Lourdes in 1899 and his remains were transferred to the Ardèvol cemetery in 1913, accompanied by a notable Carlist demonstration.

He inherited from his father, Joan Tristany, the title of Baron of Altet, Charles Louis of Bourbon granted him that of Count of Avinyó, and Charles Maria of Bourbon that of Marquis of Casa Tristany.
