= Pascual Cucala =

Spanish Valencian carlist

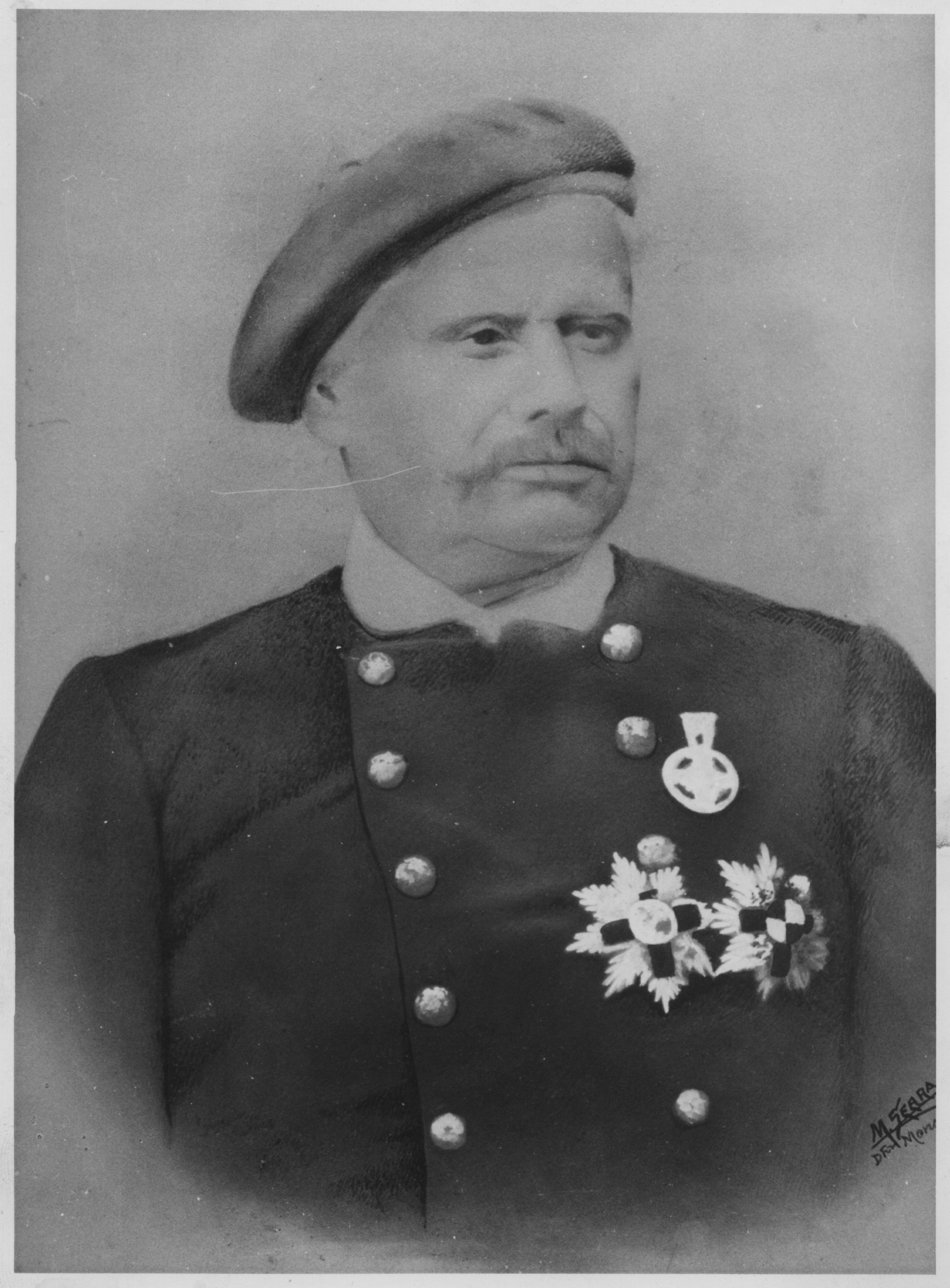
- Born: 1822; Alcalà de Xivert, Spain
- Died: January 31, 1892 (aged 69–70); Port-Vendres, France
- Allegiance: Carlists
- Battles / wars: Third Carlist War

Pascual Cucala (1822 – January 31, 1892) was a Spanish Valencian carlist. He was born in the Province of Castellón in Valencia. He fought against the army of the First Spanish Republic on behalf of Carlos, Duke of Madrid. After the defeat of the carlists in 1876, he went into exile in France, where he died.
