= Francisco Savalls =

Francisco Savalls Massot
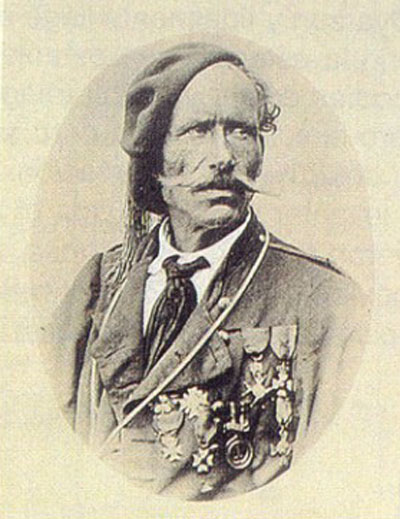
- Born: 1817; La Pera, Catalonia, Spain
- Died: 1885 (aged 67–68); Nice, France
- Military career
- Allegiance: Carlists
- Conflicts: First Carlist War; Second Carlist War; Third Carlist War

Francisco Savalls Massot (1817–1885) also known as Francesc Savalls i Massot, was a Spanish Catalan Carlist warlord and guerilla field commander. He was born in the Province of Girona. He fought in all three of the Carlist Wars on the side of the Carlists. After the defeat of Carlos, Duke of Madrid in 1876, he went into exile in France, where he died in Nice on 19 November 1885.

== Family background ==
Francesc Savalls was born at the family farmhouse of La Pera (Baix Empordà) on 29 January 1817, being the fifth son of Joan Savalls i Barella, (Note: Also spelled Badella or Badeia according to the sources) a farmer from La Pera, and Joaquima Massot i Vehí, originally from Darnius. The Savalls were a family of rural landowners from Empordà, while on his mother's side he descended from important landed houses in the Girona area.

== First Carlist War ==
At the age of seventeen, Francesc Savalls participated in the First Carlist War, alongside his father and two of his brothers, achieving the rank of captain. Joan Savalls, colonel of the 23rd battalion, fell in combat on 11 April 1838 during the Battle of Sant Quirze de Besora, in the assault on L’Escala near Montesquiu, and died the following day in Vidrà.

In 1840, he went into exile in France, but returned in 1842 to join a group of trabucaires commanded by Ramon Vicens, known as Felip, who aimed to continue the war. He participated in the combat of L’Esparra and in the assault on Ripoll on 3 June 1842. For the Spanish government, the war had ended in 1840, and Felip's group was considered a band of bandits. Consequently, Savalls was tried in absentia at Puigcerdà and sentenced to ten years in prison.

== The War of the Matiners and the War in Italy ==
He participated in the Second Carlist War (1846–1849), also known as the War of the Matiners. The records regarding his role throughout this conflict are scarce and confusing, but it is known that he took part in the action at Vidreres on 22 July 1847 alongside Marcel·lí Gonfaus and in an ambush near Matadepera in October of the following year. He was appointed commander of the Hostalric volunteer battalion. Arrested and imprisoned at Puigcerdà, from where he escaped, he was later detained again in Girona by the Guardia Civil on 14 September 1849. Soon after, he was released and left Catalonia.

After the defeat, he settled in Nice (then part of the Kingdom of Savoy), where he married Antoniette Vivaudo on 14 September 1854. Two years earlier, he had requested from Queen Isabella II to avail himself of the amnesty promulgated by the liberal government at the end of the war, as well as recognition of the rank of captain he had achieved during the First Carlist War, but the pending judicial proceedings against him for the incidents at L’Esparra and Ripoll prevented him from doing so, and both requests were denied.

He enlisted in the army of the Duchy of Modena until its incorporation into the Kingdom of Sardinia in 1859. The following year, as a captain in the corps of Papal Zouaves, he participated in the Battle of Castelfidardo against the Italian armies that sought the unification of Italy and was taken prisoner during the battle.

== Third Carlist War ==
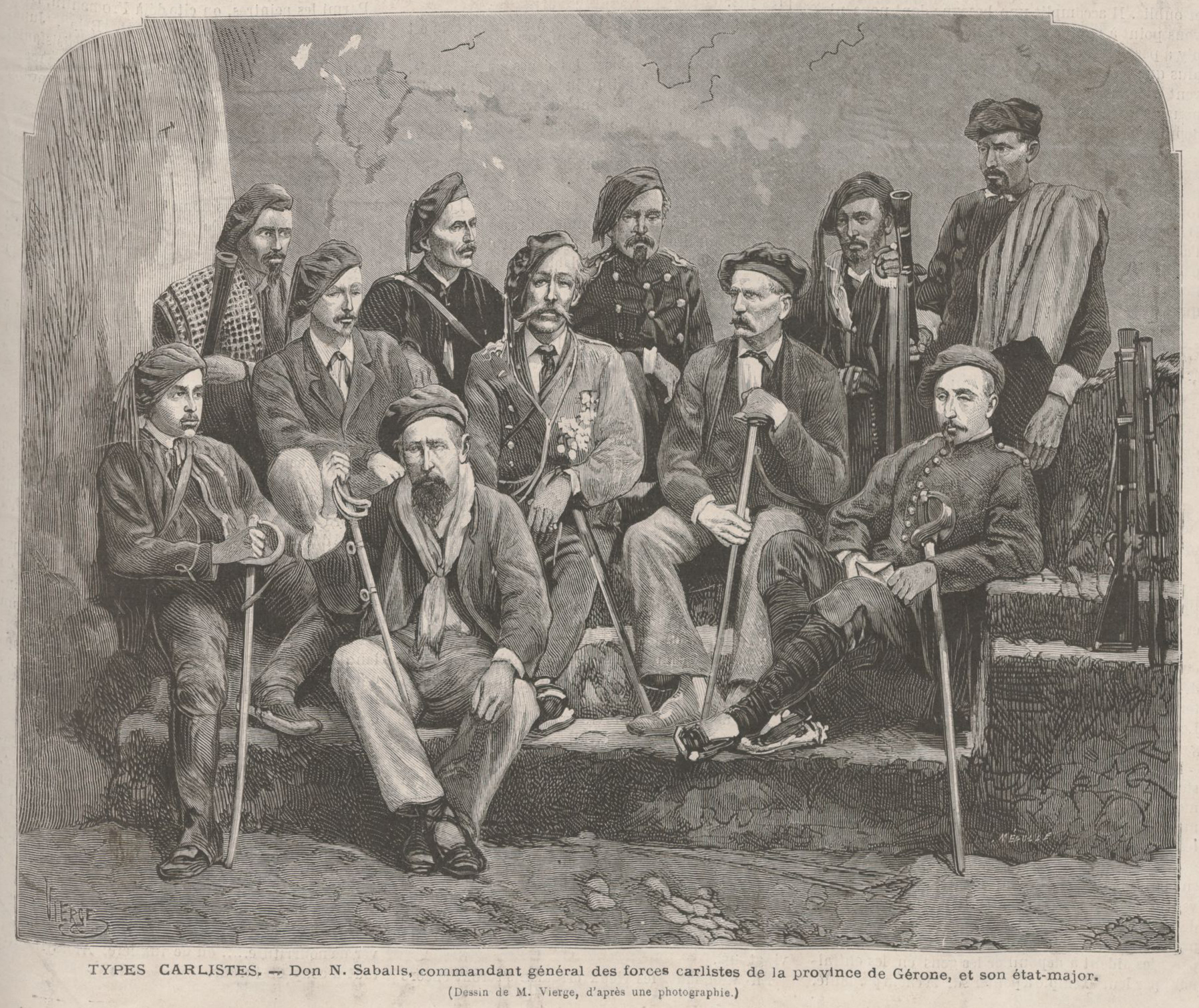
Francesc Savalls with his staff

During the Third Carlist War, he had frenetic activity at the head of a guerrilla unit, becoming a legendary figure among the other Catalan Carlist groups. A keen expert on the territory where he moved his troops, he primarily used La Garrotxa as his hideout and counted on the support of many rural landowners and numerous informants who permanently warned him of the movements of government troops.

Soon, he managed to oust his superior Josep Estartús, and faced Infante Alfonso Carlos, the representative in Catalonia and brother of the claimant Carlos VII, who brought him before a court-martial in Navarre, accused, among other charges, of having executed 60 liberal volunteers captured during the capture of Berga who had received guarantees from Infante Alfonso Carlos, of refusing to take his troops outside the Girona counties, and of appropriating a large sum from the loot of the Battle of Alpens; however, Savalls came out unscathed and managed to maintain his position.

Savalls was the trusted man of the rural landowners of the Girona counties, supporters of Carlism, and he compensated for his indiscipline with his intelligence. He also surrounded himself with good and loyal aides who were often the main responsible for some victories, especially Huguet and Miret.

By 1874, he was a field marshal and was confirmed, in that year's Carlist reorganization, as head of the Girona-Barcelona Division under the orders of Rafael Tristany i Parera. When Tristany was replaced by Antonio Lizárraga (December 1874), Savalls effectively exercised command of the Carlist army in Catalonia.

In 1875, Carlos VII appointed him captain general of Catalonia. After the defection of Ramon Cabrera, he was one of the signatories of the following declaration of support for the dynastic rights of Carlos VII:

Royal Army of Catalonia. The Royal Army of Catalonia has learned with the deepest indignation of the rebellion and betrayal of Don Ramón Cabrera, who, driven by spite and pride, has committed the infamy of renouncing his history and putting himself at the service of the crowned revolution. Our love for Your Majesty, our love for Spain, and our honor impose on us the duty to protest against such conduct. No one should believe that Don Ramón Cabrera finds imitators or followers in this Catholic country, which will never forget its traditions of nobility and honor. The Catalan army, which at the first cry of “Long live Carlos VII” gathered around the holy banner of legitimacy, cannot accept that a renegade declares to the world that he will lay that glorious standard at the feet of the king of the revolution. Before such a misfortune happens, we will all know how to die wrapped in its folds, all of us, who three years ago wielded it with such strength. Sir: You have promised to kill the revolution, and you will kill it. Trust, for that, your brave Catalans, and be certain that they will always shoot those who dare to speak to them of peace with the revolution, of agreement with the enemy, or of rebellion against Your Majesty, for whom today they shed their blood. (signed) FRANCISCO SAVALLS, ANTONIO LIZÁRRAGA, ALBERTO MORER

=== Main Military Actions ===
His military record in the Third Carlist War is dense and clearly marks the stages that the uprising followed in Catalonia:

==== Year 1873 ====
- Victory at Mata and Borgonyà.
- Capture of Ripoll and siege of Berga (March 1873).
- Failed siege of Puigcerdà (April 1873).
- Action of Alpens (9 - 10 July 1873) — in which Brigadier Cabrinetty was defeated and killed.
- Capture of Igualada (17 - 18 July 1873).
- Assault on Cardedeu (6 November 1873), with the summary execution of 25 captured defenders.
- Capture of Banyoles (November 1873).
- Beginning of the Siege of Olot (December 1873).

==== Year 1874 ====
- Fall of Olot, where he defeated the famous General Nouvilas. As a consequence, the executions at Creu del Candell, in Besalú, took place on 19 March.
- Loss of Olot and clash at Sant Julià del Mont (July), with Savalls' decision to execute 63 men of the Nouvilas column at Llaés (17 July).
- Surprise at Vidrà (July). Savalls and Francesc Huguet had gone to lunch at the masia del Cavaller de Vidrà on Saint Joachim's day, the name day of its owner. There they were caught and surrounded by Isabeline troops and fortified inside. At dawn, Savalls orchestrated an escape by opening the doors and causing the cattle and horses in the courtyard to stampede. Huguet and Savalls fled on horseback, while the trabucaires of their bodyguard fled on foot.
- Burning of Tortellà and Battle of Argelaguer (August) — led by Huguet and described by Marià Vayreda, who participated.
- Capture of Castelló d'Empúries in the battle known as the Fire of Castelló on 3 November 1874, where he decisively defeated Brigadier Antonio Moya.
- Victorious expedition through La Selva and Baix Empordà (spring 1874).
- Failed assault on Puigcerdà (August 1874).
- Fire of Prats de Lluçanès (September 1874).
- Failed attempt to recapture Vic (October 1874).

==== Year 1875 ====
- Loss of Olot in March 1875, in the face of the assault by General Martínez de Campos, after which the meeting at Hostal de la Corda took place.
- In July, another failed attack on Puigcerdà and in August fruitless relief operations at besieged La Seu d'Urgell.

== Exile in France and death ==
Savalls was dismissed and retired to Camprodon and later to France. In October 1875, he definitively moved to Nice, where his wife Pellegrina Antoinette Vivaudo (1830–1899) was from, and where he worked as a wine merchant and eventually died in 1885. Before that, he underwent a court-martial, which acquitted him of the charge of treason that had been brought against him. The family is buried in Nice at the Caucade Cemetery, sector 1, grave number 362. There are four children buried there: Jean Charles Joseph, Carlos Alphonse, Ida, and Thérèse Joachine Raphaelle.

== Bibliography ==
- Artagan, B. de (1912). "Don Francisco Savalls y Masot". Príncipe heroico y soldados leales (in Spanish). Barcelona: La Bandera Regional.
- Garrabou, Joan (1992). Francesc Savalls. Barcelona: Labor. ISBN 9788433548016.
- Grabolosa, Ramon (1972). Carlins i liberals. Barcelona: Editorial Aedos.
- Mundet, Josep Maria; Puigdevall, Narcís (2018). Savalls: el general carlí. Sant Vicenç de Castellet: Farell. ISBN 978-84-17116-05-7.
- Narración Militar de la Guerra Carlista de 1869 a 1876 (in Spanish). Madrid: Cuerpo de Estado Mayor del Ejército. 1887.
