= Torcuato Mendiri =

Torcuato Mendiri y Colera
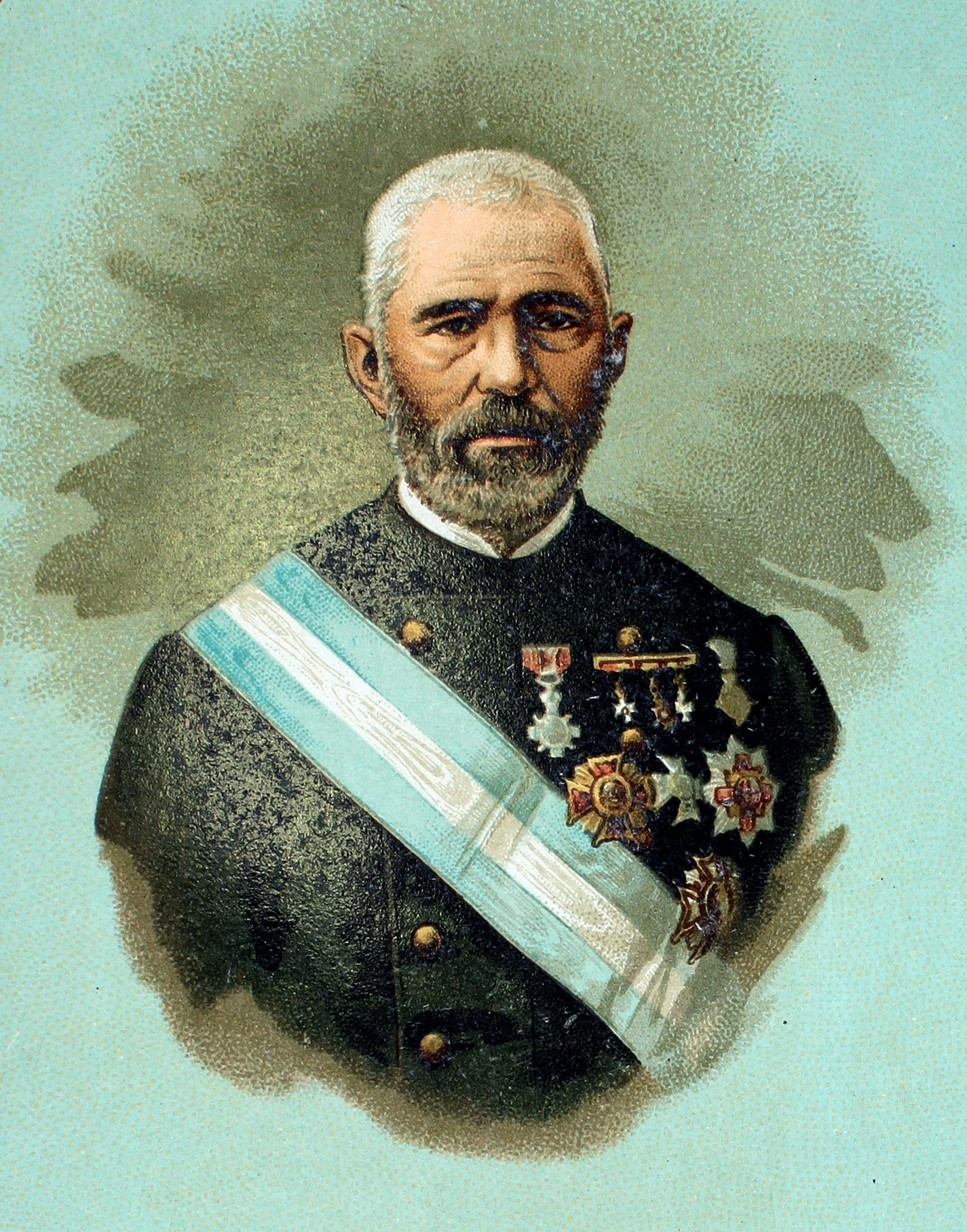
- Born: 1813; Allo
- Died: 1884; Tudela
- Battles / wars: First Carlist War; Third Carlist War

Torcuato Mendiri y Colera (1813–1884) was a Spanish nobleman. He fought on the side of the Carlists in the First (1833–1839) and Third (1872–1876) Carlist Wars.
