= Jenaro Quesada, 1st Marquis of Miravalles =

Spanish soldier

Captain general of the Army Jenaro de Quesada y Matheus 1st Marquis of Miravelles
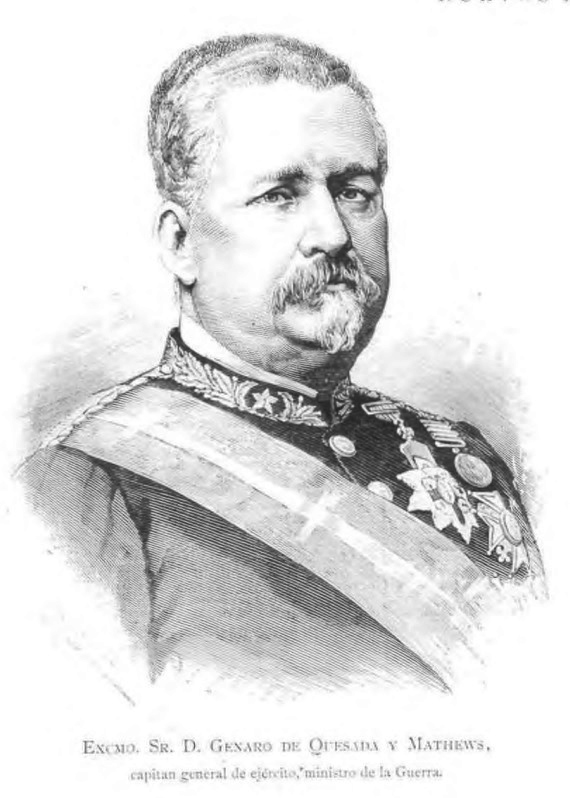
- Jenaro Quesada, 1st Marquis of Miravalles
- Born: 6 February 1818; Santander, Spain
- Died: 19 January 1889 (aged 70); Madrid, Spain
- Spouse: Carolina Gutiérrez de los Ríos
- Children: Carlos de Quesada y Gutiérrez de los Ríos; Isidra de Quesada y Gutiérrez de los Ríos
- Relatives: Vicente Genaro de Quesada (father)
- Military career
- Allegiance: (Restoration (Spain)) Spain
- Branch: Spanish Army
- Service years: 1824–1889
- Rank: Captain general of the Army
- Conflicts: First Carlist War Spanish Revolution of 1854 Hispano-Moroccan War (1859–1860): Battle of Wad Ras; Second Carlist War

Minister of War of Spain
- In office 18 January 1884 – 27 November 1885
- Monarch: Alfonso XII
- Regent: Maria Christina of Austria
- Prime Minister: Antonio Cánovas del Castillo
- Preceded by: José López Domínguez
- Succeeded by: Joaquín Jovellar y Soler

Director general of the Civil Guard
- In office 21 November 1863 – 29 September 1864
- Monarch: Isabella II
- Prime Minister: Manuel de Pando, 6th Marquis of Miraflores; Lorenzo Arrazola; Alejandro Mon y Menéndez; Ramón María Narváez
- Minister of Governance: Florencio Rodríguez Vaamonde; Antonio de Benavides y Fernández de Navarrete; Antonio Cánovas del Castillo; Luis González Bravo
- Preceded by: Isidoro de Hoyos y Rubín de Celis
- Succeeded by: Ángel García-Loygorri y García de Tejada

Jenaro Quesada y Matheus, 1st Marquis of Miravalles, Grandee of Spain, (in full, Spanish: Don Genaro Quesada y Matheus, primer marqués de Miravalles), (6 February 1818 – 19 January 1889), was a Spanish soldier

== Early life ==
Quesada was born at Santander. He was the son of General Vicente Genaro de Quesada, a Conservative officer who was killed and mutilated outside Madrid by a revolutionary crowd in the early days of Queen Isabella's reign.

Quesada belonged to an ancient family connected with the Dukes of Fernan Nuñez and was made a cornet when six years old. He followed his education at the seminary for nobles and was promoted to Lieutenant in the 1st Foot Guards in 1833. He served from 1833 to 1836 against the Carlists. When his father was assassinated in 1836 he resigned, went to France, got employment in a merchant's office and was induced to return to the army in 1837 by his relatives, who got him a company in the guards.

== Military career ==
He distinguished himself in the Carlist war, but his promotion was slow, and he declined to have anything to do with politics. He confined himself to his duties as a soldier, fighting on the side of governments against Carlist, Republican and Progressive uprisings. Quesada became a General of Division in 1853, and at the head of the Madrid garrison, he fought in 1854 to avert the triumph of Espartero, General O'Donnell, who publicly recognized his gallant conduct.

When the war in Morocco broke out, O'Donnell gave Quesada the command of a division, which played so conspicuous a part in that campaign and at the battle of Wad el Ras, that its commander was made Lieutenant General and Grand Cross of Charles III.

He was director-general of the Guardia Civil (Civil Guard) when the military rebellion of June 22, 1866 broke out in Madrid and, after he had been wounded in the leg, he remained at the head of the loyal troops until the insurgents were crushed. He did not accept any military post during the revolution until General Serrano in 1874 offered him the direction of the staff, and he only accepted it after clearly stating that he was a royalist and partisan of King Alfonso XII of Spain.

Quesada never swerved from his steadfast resolve to be mixed up in any political or military intrigues or pronunciamientos. To use his own words, "not even to restore my king."

As soon as the king was restored, the government of Antonio Cánovas del Castillo made Quesada the first General-in-chief of the army in central Spain, and in February 1875 general-in-chief of the army of the North. With the assistance of another officer who also had never dabbled in pronunciamientos, General O'Ryan, Quesada restored discipline in the armies confronting Infante Carlos, and for twelve months concerted and conducted the operations that forced the pretender to retire into France and his followers to lay down their arms. The government confided to the Marquis of Miravalles the difficult task of ruling the Northern Provinces for several years after the war, and he succeeded in conciliating the sympathies in the Basque Provinces and Navarre, though the penalty for their last rising had been the loss of most of their ancient liberties or fueros.

== Later life ==
Quesada was made Marquis of Miravalles and Grandee after the war, minister of war in 1883 and senator. Though he was a strict, stern disciplinarian of the old school and an unflinching Conservative, Catholic and royalist, even his political and military opponents respected him, and were proud of him as an unblemished type of the Castilian soldier and gentleman.

He died in Madrid in January 1889, and was given full military honours.

Spanish nobility
New title	Marquis of Miravalles; 1876–1889	Succeeded by Isidra de Quesada y Gutiérrez de los Ríos
