= Second Carlist War =

Small revolt in Spain from 1846 to 1849

- Part of the Carlist Wars
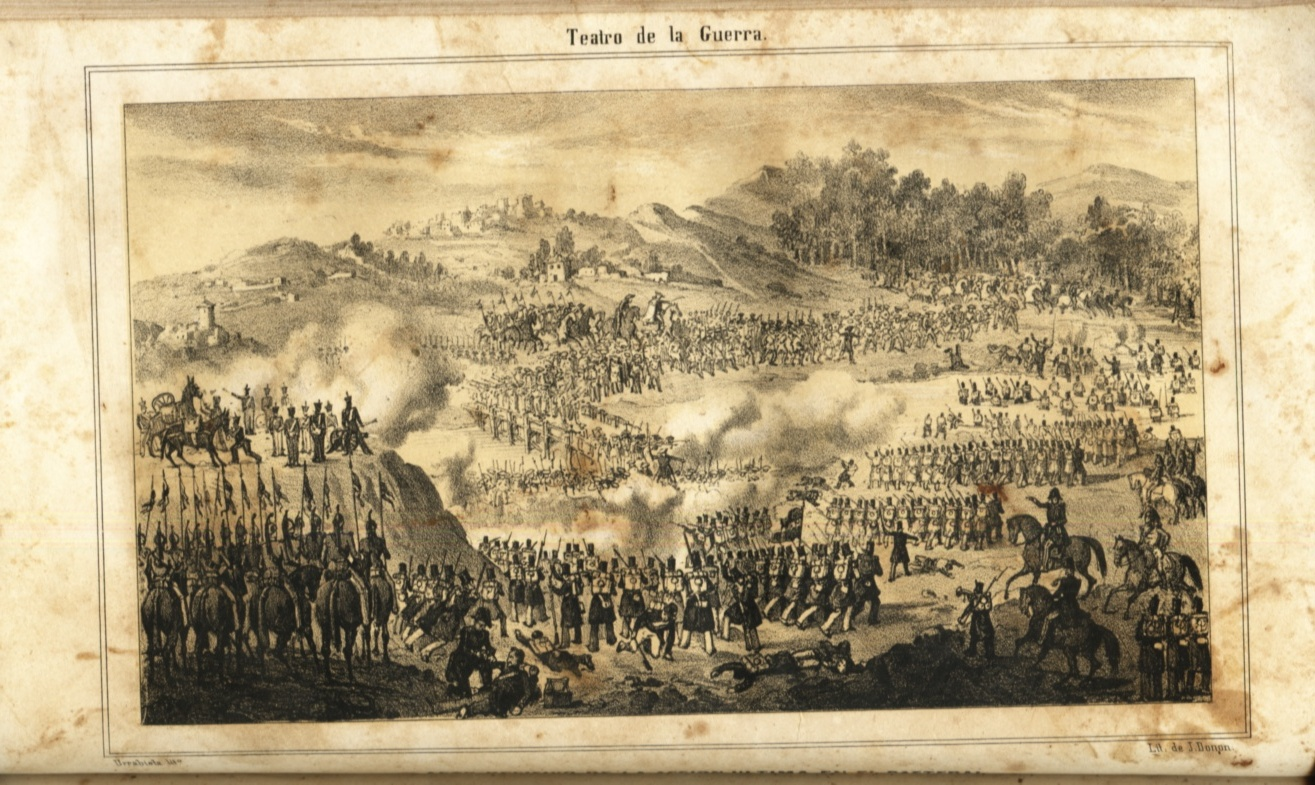
- The Battle of Pasteral, 1849.
Date	1846–1849
Location	Spain, primarily Catalonia
Result	Liberal victory

Belligerents
Carlists; Catalan progressives	Liberals

Commanders and leaders
See list: Carlos VI Ramón Cabrera	See list: Isabella II Maria Christina Ramón de Narváez Fernando de Córdova

Strength
Carlists: 5,000	Liberals: 50,000

The Second Carlist War, or the War of the Matiners (Catalan for "early-risers," so-called from the harassing action that took place at the earliest hours of the morning), was a civil war in Spain. Some historians consider it a direct Catalan revolt against Madrid, fought primarily in Catalonia by the Carlists under General Ramón Cabrera against the forces of the government of Isabella II. The uprising began in September 1846 and continued until May 1849, spreading to Galicia.

Theoretically, the war was fought to facilitate the marriage of Isabella II with the Carlist pretender, Carlos Luis de Borbón (or Carlos VI), which was supported by some doctrinaire elements from the moderate party and by the Carlists. The marriage never took place, as Isabella II was wed to Francisco de Borbón.

The conflict was rather minor in the Basque Country in the Basque context, a central focus of Carlist uprisings, it was non-existent, so "Second Carlist War" invariably refers to the Third Carlist War. It coincided with the democratic Revolutions of 1848, when Maria Christina revoked the constitution of Ramón de Narváez. Narváez himself led the counterattack against the revolt in Galicia while Fernando de Córdova, captain-general of Catalonia, put down the isolated rebel cells in that region by early 1849. In June of that year, amnesty was granted to the Carlists and those who had fled returned.

The war caused between 3,000 and 10,000 casualties.
