= Consular District of Tunis =

District of Tunis, Tunisia

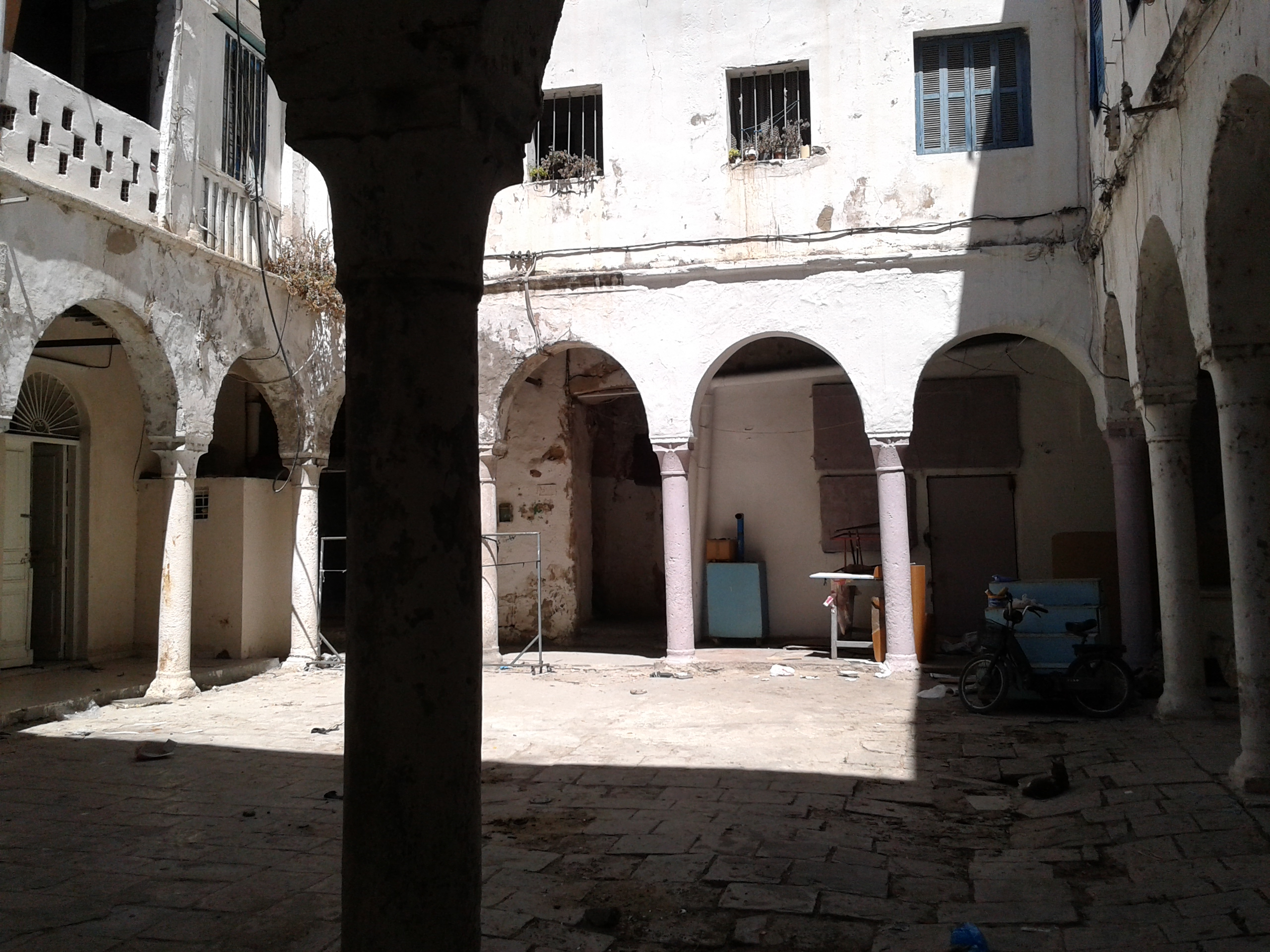
Courtyard of the French Fondouk

The Consular District of Tunis is defined as the area of consular and diplomatic activity. during the Ottoman Regency of Tunis.

== History ==
During the Hafsid era, the European nations were prohibited from setting up consulates within the medina walls of Tunis. In the wake of the transition to the Ottoman sovereignty in the 16th century, consuls are granted the right to settle down in fondouks or consular houses.

The consular district is then born with the building of the first consular house within the walls in the medina's frank quarter. It is the Foudouk of the French built in 1660.

== Location ==
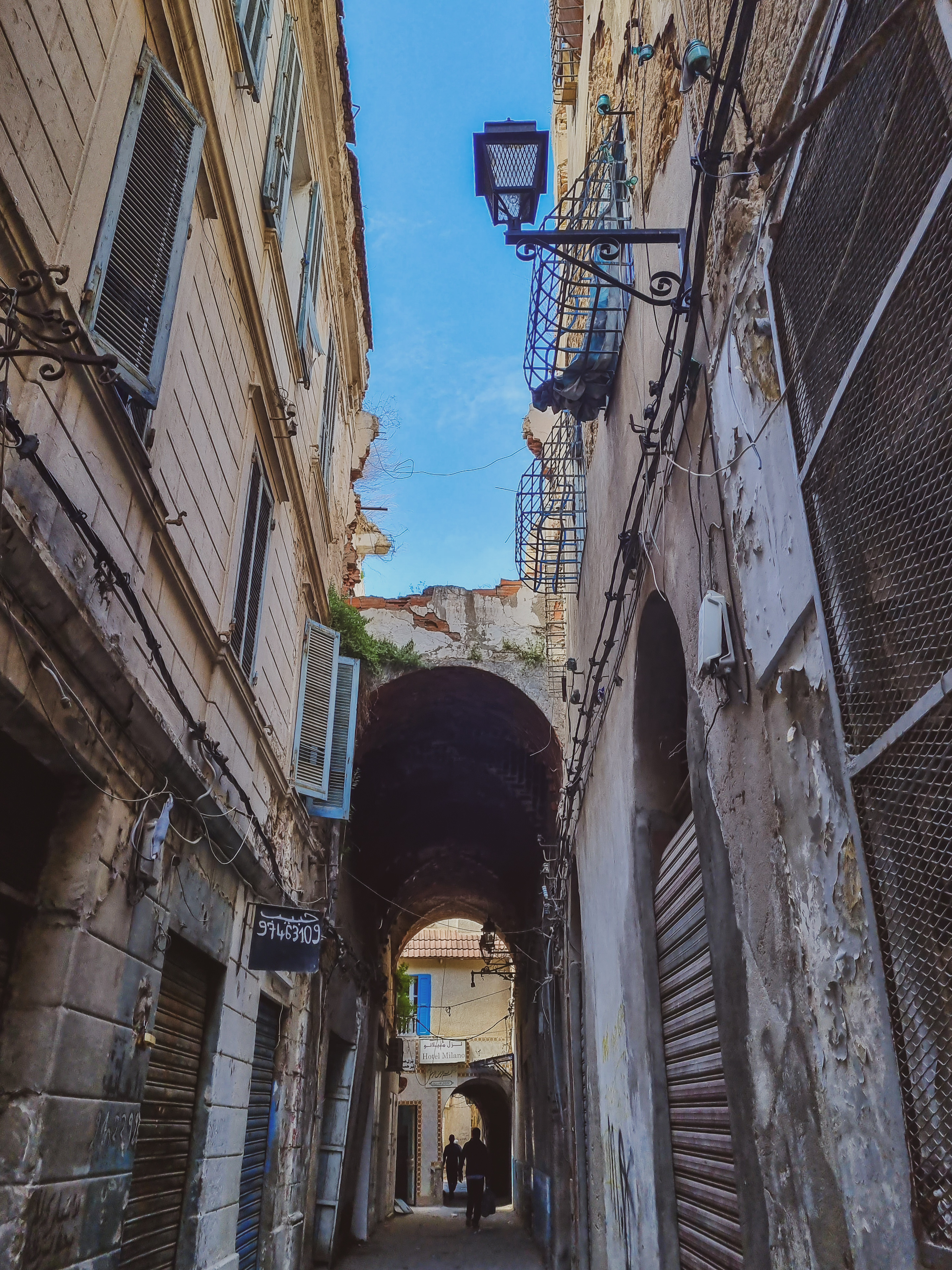
Ancienne Douane Street

Originally formed around the Place de la Bourse, now the Place de la Victoire, opposite Bab El Bhar, its fluctuating boundaries extended to the Rue Sidi Kadous to the north, the Place de Castille to the south and the Rue de la Verrerie to the west.

The consular houses of Sweden (which became the Hôtel Eymon in 1875) and Portugal overlook the square, so does the former Fondouk des Anglais.

In addition to the fondouk des Français, you can still see the former consular houses of the Grand Duchy of Tuscany, the Holy Roman Empire, Genoa, Venice, Germany and the United States, all located along the rue de l'Ancienne Douane.

The former consular house of the Netherlands (formerly the Nunez-Cardoso fondouk) and those of the Kingdoms of the Two Sicilies and Sardinia can still be found in rue Zarkoun.

The Spanish Consulate and the Royal Spanish Hospital occupied the buildings housing the Sainte-Croix church and presbytery in front of the Danish Consulate, now a municipal district.

== Function ==
The fondouk consisted of a central courtyard around which were set living quarters for merchants, bread ovens, warehouses, sales outlets and a chancery. The consul, who lived in the fondouk, collected the income from the rental, warehousing and chancery fees
