= 1875 =

1875 in various calendars
- Gregorian calendar: 1875; MDCCCLXXV
- Ab urbe condita: 2628
- Armenian calendar: 1324; ԹՎ ՌՅԻԴ
- Assyrian calendar: 6625
- Baháʼí calendar: 31–32
- Balinese saka calendar: 1796–1797
- Bengali calendar: 1281–1282
- Berber calendar: 2825
- British Regnal year: 38 Vict. 1 – 39 Vict. 1
- Buddhist calendar: 2419
- Burmese calendar: 1237
- Byzantine calendar: 7383–7384
- Chinese calendar: 甲戌年 (Wood Dog); 4572 or 4365 — to — 乙亥年 (Wood Pig); 4573 or 4366
- Coptic calendar: 1591–1592
- Discordian calendar: 3041
- Ethiopian calendar: 1867–1868
- Hebrew calendar: 5635–5636
- Hindu calendars
- Vikram Samvat: 1931–1932
- Shaka Samvat: 1796–1797
- Kali Yuga: 4975–4976
- Holocene calendar: 11875
- Igbo calendar: 875–876
- Iranian calendar: 1253–1254
- Islamic calendar: 1291–1292
- Japanese calendar: Meiji 8 (明治８年)
- Javanese calendar: 1803–1804
- Julian calendar: Gregorian minus 12 days
- Korean calendar: 4208
- Minguo calendar: 37 before ROC 民前37年
- Nanakshahi calendar: 407
- Thai solar calendar: 2417–2418
- Tibetan calendar: ཤིང་ཕོ་ཁྱི་ལོ་ (male Wood-Dog); 2001 or 1620 or 848 — to — ཤིང་མོ་ཕག་ལོ་ (female Wood-Boar); 2002 or 1621 or 849

1875 (MDCCCLXXV) was a common year starting on Friday of the Gregorian calendar and a common year starting on Wednesday of the Julian calendar, the 1875th year of the Common Era (CE) and Anno Domini (AD) designations, the 875th year of the 2nd millennium, the 75th year of the 19th century, and the 6th year of the 1870s decade. As of the start of 1875, the Gregorian calendar was 12 days ahead of the Julian calendar, which remained in localized use until 1923.

== Events ==
=== January ===
- January 1 – The Midland Railway of England abolishes the Second Class passenger category, leaving First Class and Third Class. Other British railway companies follow Midland's lead during the rest of the year (Third Class is renamed Second Class in 1956).
- January 5 – The Palais Garnier, one of the most famous opera houses in the world, is inaugurated as the home of the Paris Opera.
- January 12 – Guangxu becomes the 11th Qing dynasty Emperor of China at the age of 3. He succeeds his cousin, the Tongzhi Emperor, who had no sons of his own.
- January 14 – The newly proclaimed King Alfonso XII of Spain (Queen Isabella II's son) arrives in Spain to restore the monarchy during the Third Carlist War.
- January 24 – Camille Saint-Saëns' orchestral Danse macabre receives its première.

=== February ===
- February 3 – Third Carlist War: Battle of Lácar – Carlist commander Torcuato Mendíri secures a brilliant victory, when he surprises and routs a Government force under General Enrique Bargés at Lácar, east of Estella, nearly capturing newly crowned King Alfonso XII. The Carlists take several pieces of artillery, more than 2,000 rifles, and 300 prisoners. 800 men of both sides are killed (mostly government troops).
- February 18 – The Mason County War begins, as a German-American mob breaks into a prison, and lynches cattle rustlers in central Texas.
- February 24 – The SS Gothenburg sinks off Australia's east coast with the loss of approximately 102 lives, including a number of high-profile civil servants and dignitaries.
- February 25 – The majority of the Yavapai (Wipukyipai) and Tonto Apache (Dil Zhéé) tribes are forced by the United States Cavalry, under command of Brigadier General George Crook, to walk at gunpoint from Arizona's Verde Valley, to the San Carlos Apache Indian Reservation, 180 miles to the southeast. The two tribes are not allowed to return to the Verde Valley until 1900.
- February 27 – Newton Booth, 11th Governor of California, resigns, having been elected Senator. Lieutenant Governor of California Romualdo Pacheco becomes acting Governor. He is later replaced by elected governor William Irwin.

=== March ===
- March 1 – The United States Congress passes the Civil Rights Act, which prohibits racial discrimination in public accommodations and jury duty.
- March 3
  - Bizet's Carmen is first performed at the Opéra-Comique, Paris, France, three months before the composer's death.
  - The Page Act of 1875 is enacted in the United States, effectively prohibiting the immigration of Chinese women.
  - The first indoor ice hockey game is played at the Victoria Skating Rink in Montreal, Quebec, Canada.
- March 15 – Roman Catholic Archbishop of New York John McCloskey is named the first cardinal in the United States.

=== April ===
- April 10 – The Arya Samaj is founded in Mumbai by Swami Dayananda Saraswati.
- April 25 – Ten sophomores from Rutgers College (modern-day Rutgers University) steal a one-ton cannon from the campus of the College of New Jersey (modern-day Princeton University), and start the Rutgers–Princeton Cannon War.
- April – 'Albert's swarm' of Rocky Mountain locusts begins to devastate the western United States.

=== May ===
- May 7
  - The Treaty of Saint Petersburg is signed between Japan and Russia.
  - German liner SS Schiller wrecks on the rocks off the Isles of Scilly, with the loss of 335 lives.
- May 17 – Aristides wins the first Kentucky Derby.
- May 20 – The Metre Convention is signed in Paris, France.

=== June ===
- June 4 – Two American colleges play each other in arguably the first game of college football: Tufts University and Harvard University at Jarvis Field in Cambridge, Massachusetts.
- June 18 – The Dublin whiskey fire in Ireland leaves 13 people dead and causes more than €6 million worth of damage.
- June 29 – The Artisans' and Labourers' Dwellings Improvement Act 1875 is passed in the United Kingdom, to permit slum clearance.
- June –
  - The record-setting American clipper Flying Cloud of 1851 is burned for scrap metal.
  - Third Carlist War in Spain: Two government armies under General Quesada and Martínez Campos start encroaching on Carlist territory. Both they and their Carlist opponent (Mendiri) drive opposing sympathisers from their homes, and burn crops in areas they can not hold. Several Carlist generals (Dorregaray, Savalls, and others) are unjustly put on trial for disloyalty. Mendiri is also removed from his command, and replaced by the Count of Caserta. Despite having 48 infantry battalions, 3 cavalry regiments, 2 engineer battalions, and 100 pieces of artillery at his disposal, Caserta is heavily outnumbered by the government forces opposing him.

=== July ===
- July 1 – The General Postal Union is established.
- July 1–7 – Third Carlist War: Battle of Treviño – Advancing on the key city of Vitoria, in Navarre, Spanish Republican commander General Jenardo de Quesada sends General Tello to attack the Carlist lines just to the southwest, at Treviño. The newly appointed Carlist commander General José Pérula is heavily defeated and withdraws, and soon afterwards Quesada enters Vitoria in triumph.
- July 9 – Asia's first stock exchange is established as The Native Share & Stock Brokers Association (the modern-day Bombay Stock Exchange).
- July 11 – Tanaka Manufacturing, a telecommunications factory in Ginza, Tokyo, a predecessor of Toshiba, a Japanese electromechanics giant, is founded.
- July 28 – Joe Borden throws the first no-hitter in baseball history versus Mike Golden and the Chicago White Stockings in his third start as a replacement for Cherokee Fisher as a member of the Philadelphia White Stockings

=== August ===
- August 6 – Hibernian F.C. is founded by Irishmen in Edinburgh, Scotland.
- August 25 – Captain Matthew Webb becomes the first person to swim the English Channel.

=== September ===
- September 1 – A murder conviction begins to break the power of the violent Irish-American anti-owner coal miners, the "Molly Maguires", in Pennsylvania.
- September 7 – Battle of Agurdat: An Egyptian invasion of Ethiopia fails, when Emperor Yohannes IV defeats an army led by Werner Munzinger.
- September 11 – Egypt adopts the Gregorian calendar; replacing the Coptic/Alexandrian calendar (based on the ancient Egyptian calendar) which had been the official calendar since the Roman period.
- September 24 – The 1864 play Heath Cobblers by Aleksis Kivi is premiered for the first time in Oulu, Finland.
- September 27 – American merchant sailing ship Ellen Southard is wrecked off Liverpool in England; 12 crew and life-boatmen are lost.
- September – English Association football team Birmingham City F.C. is founded as Small Heath Alliance in Birmingham by a group of cricketers from Holy Trinity Church, Bordesley, playing its first match in November.

=== October ===
- October 15 – Chief Lone Horn of the Minneconjou dies at the Cheyenne River, leaving his son Big Foot as the new chief.
- October 16 – Brigham Young University is founded in Provo, Utah.
- October 25 – The first performance of the Piano Concerto No. 1 by Pyotr Ilyich Tchaikovsky is given in Boston, Massachusetts, with Hans von Bülow as soloist.
- October 30 – The Theosophical Society is founded in New York by Helena Blavatsky, Henry Steel Olcott, William Quan Judge, and others.
- October – The Ottoman state declares partial bankruptcy, and places its finances in the hands of European creditors. It is also suffering widespread nationalist rebellions resulting in Russian intervention and Great Power tensions.

=== November ===
- November 5 – Blackburn Rovers F.C. is founded in England by two old-boys of Shrewsbury School following a meeting at the Leger Hotel, Blackburn.
- November 9 – American Indian Wars: In Washington, D.C., Indian Inspector E.C. Watkins issues a report stating that hundreds of Sioux and Cheyenne associated with Sitting Bull and Crazy Horse are hostile to the United States (the Battle of the Little Bighorn is fought in Montana the next year).
- November 16 – Battle of Gundat: Ethiopian Emperor Yohannes IV defeats another Egyptian army.
- November 26 – The Times newspaper in London reveals that Isma'il Pasha has sold Egypt's 44% share in the Suez Canal to Britain, in a deal secured by Benjamin Disraeli, without the prior sanction of the British Parliament.
- November 29 – Dōshisha English School, predecessor of Dōshisha University, is founded in Kyōto, Japan.

=== December ===
- December 4 – Notorious New York City politician Boss Tweed escapes from prison and flees to Spain.
- December 6
  - The German emigrant ship SS Deutschland runs aground off the English coast, killing 157 passengers and crew.
  - A firedamp explosion at kills 143 miners at the Swaithe Main Colliery in the South Yorkshire Coalfield of England.
- December 9 – The Massachusetts Rifle Association, America's oldest active gun club, is formed.
- December 20 – The ICRM is renamed the International Committee of the Red Cross (ICRC).
- December 25 – The first Edinburgh derby in Association football is played: Heart of Midlothian F.C. wins 1–0 against Hibernian F.C.

=== Date unknown ===
- Convent Scandal: During the winter in Montreal, typhoid fever strikes at a convent school. The corpses of the victims are filched by body-snatchers before relatives arrive from America, causing much furor. Eventually the Anatomy Act of Quebec is changed over it.
- At Wimbledon, Henry Cavendish Jones convinces the All England Croquet Club to replace a croquet lawn with a lawn tennis court.
- British Indian Army officer Neville Chamberlain originates the cue sport of snooker at Jubbulpore (Jabalpur) in India.
- The opening of Flushing High School, the oldest public high school in New York City.

== Births ==
=== January–February ===
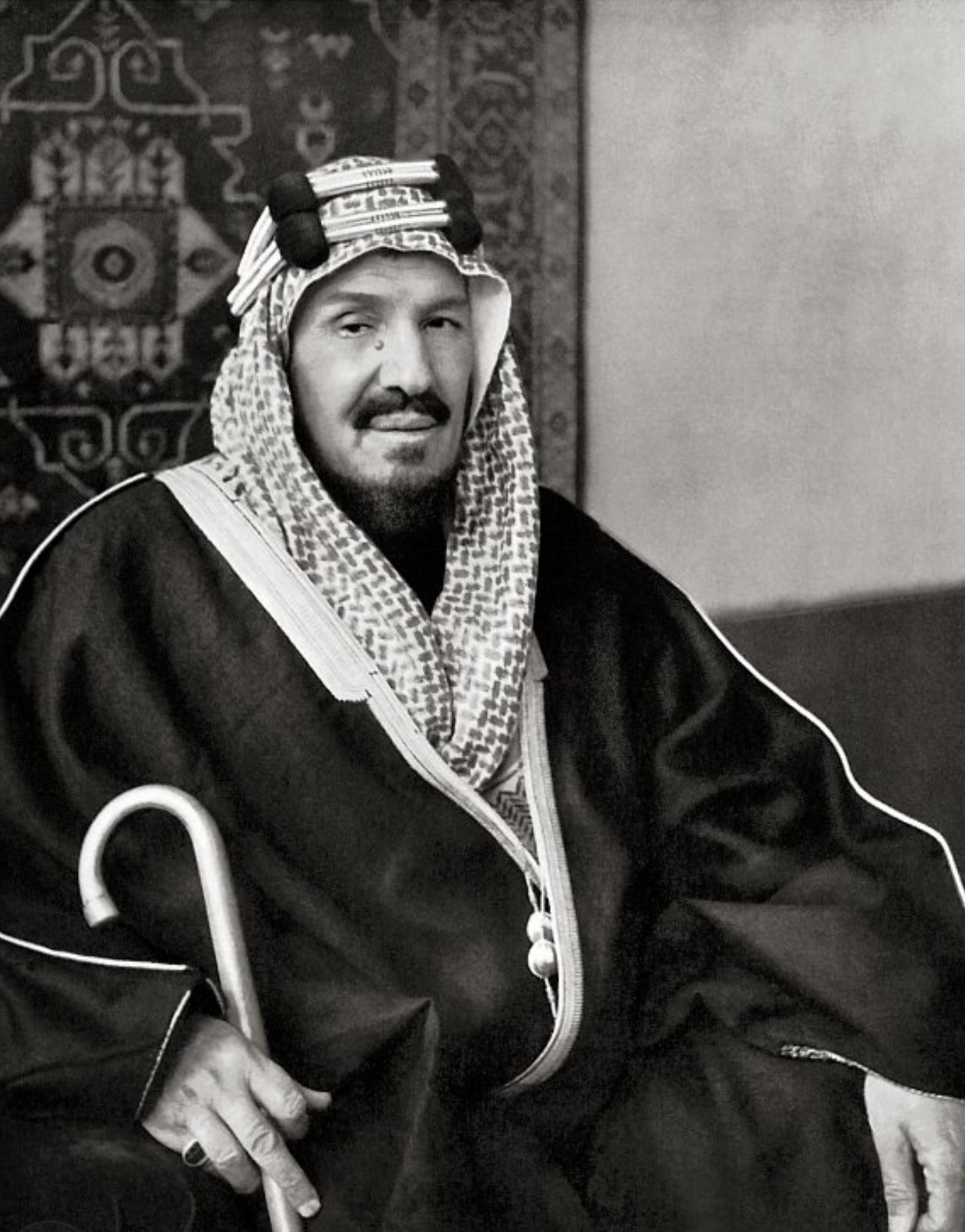
King Ibn Saud

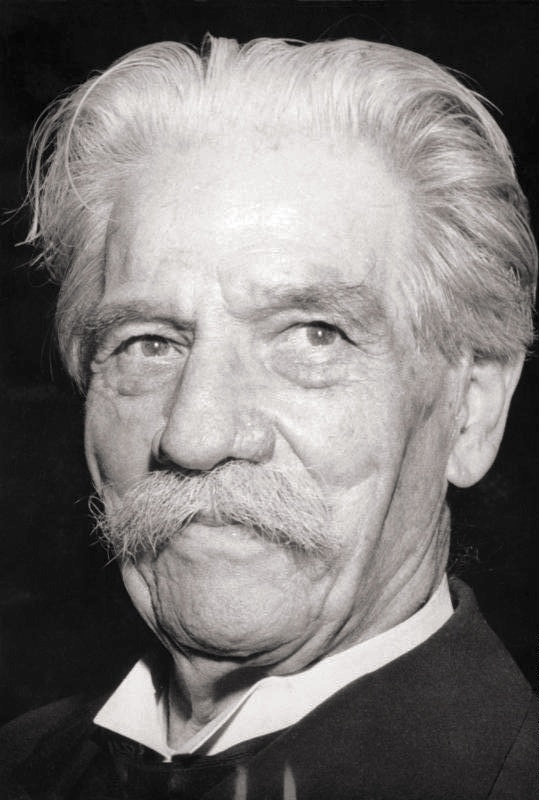
Albert Schweitzer

- January 3 – Alexandros Diomidis, Prime Minister of Greece (d. 1950)
- January 5 – J. Stuart Blackton, American film producer (d. 1941)
- January 6 – Leslie Green, English architect (d. 1908)
- January 9 – Gertrude Vanderbilt Whitney, American sculptor, socialite (d. 1942)
- January 11 – Reinhold Glière, Russian composer (d. 1956)
- January 14
  - Felix Hamrin, 22nd Prime Minister of Sweden (d. 1937)
  - Albert Schweitzer, Alsatian philosopher and musician, recipient of the Nobel Peace Prize (d. 1965)
- January 15
  - Thomas Burke, American sprinter (d. 1929)
  - King Ibn Saud of Saudi Arabia (d. 1953)
- January 22 – D. W. Griffith, American film director (The Birth of a Nation) (d. 1948)
- February 1 – Eddie Polo, Austrian-American actor (d. 1961)
- February 2 – Fritz Kreisler, Austrian violinist (d. 1962)
- February 4 – Ludwig Prandtl, German physicist (d. 1953)
- February 7 – Erkki Melartin, Finnish composer (d. 1937)
- February 8 – Valentine O'Hara, Irish author, authority on Russia and the Baltic states (d. 1941)
- February 21 – Jeanne Calment, French supercentenarian, world's longest lived person (d. 1997)
- February 26 – Emma Dunn, British-born stage, screen actress (d. 1966)
- February 27 – Olga Volkenstein, Russian journalist, suffragist and a leader of the women's rights movement in pre-revolutionary Russia (d.1942)

=== March–April ===
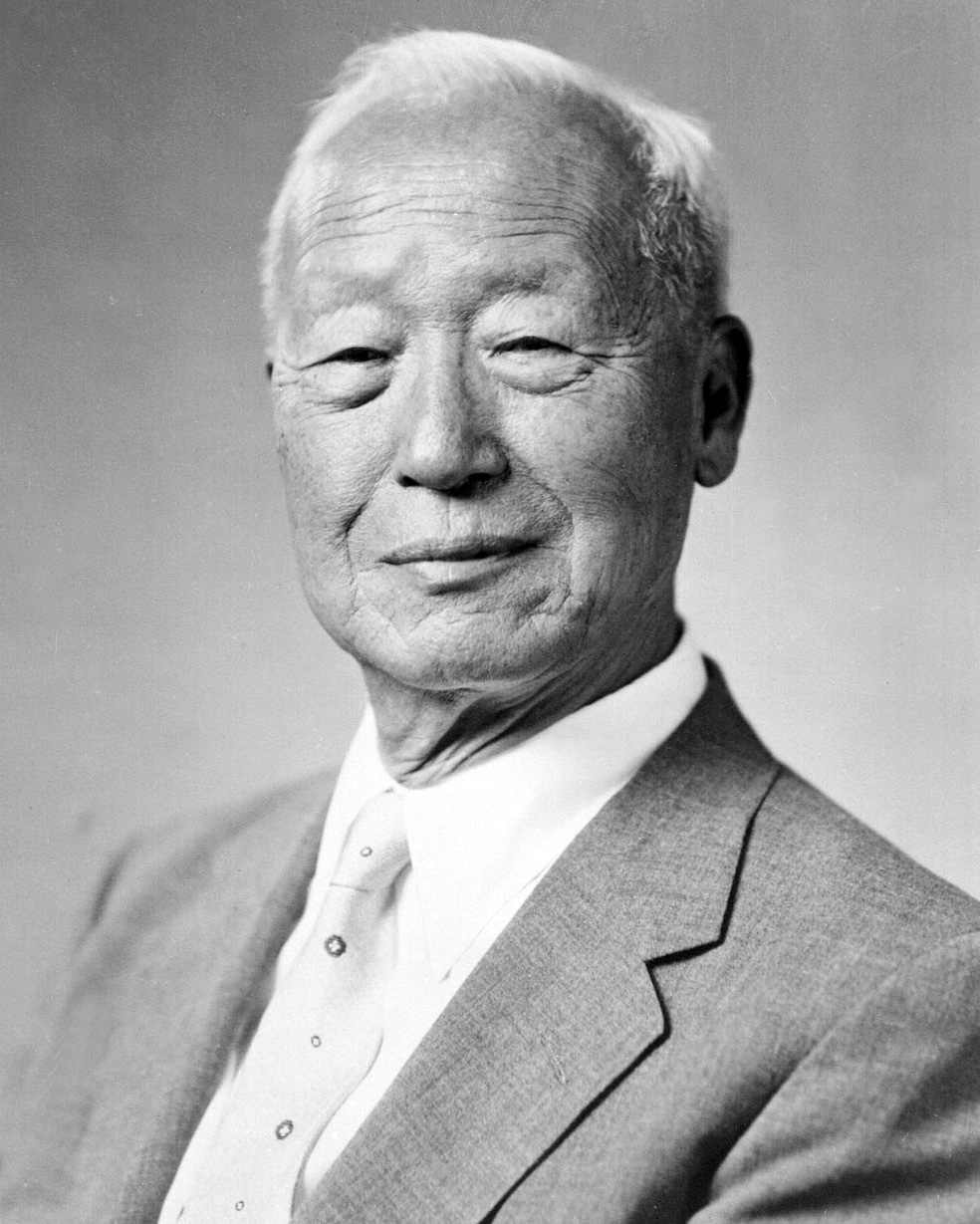
Syngman Rhee

- March 4 – Mihály Károlyi, Prime Minister and President of Hungary (d. 1955)
- March 7 – Maurice Ravel, French composer (d. 1937)
- March 8 – Kenkichi Ueda, Japanese general (d. 1962)
- March 9
  - Juan de Dios Martínez, 23rd President of Ecuador (d. 1955)
  - Martin Shaw, English composer and conductor (d. 1958)
- March 19 – Zhang Zuolin, Chinese bandit, soldier, and warlord (d. 1928)
- March 26 – Syngman Rhee, President of South Korea (d. 1965)
- March 28 – Helen Westley, American stage, film actress (d. 1942)
- April 1 – Edgar Wallace, English author (d. 1932)
- April 2 – Walter Chrysler, American automobile pioneer (d. 1940)
- April 4
  - Samuel S. Hinds, American actor (d. 1948)
  - Pierre Monteux, French-born conductor (d. 1964)
- April 5 – Mistinguett, French singer (d. 1956)
- April 8 – King Albert I of Belgium (d. 1934)
- April 9 – Kristian Laake, Norwegian general (d. 1950)
- April 15 – James J. Jeffries, American boxer (d. 1953)
- April 18 – Abd-ru-shin, German author (d. 1941)

=== May–June ===
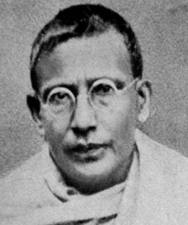
Krishna Chandra Bhattacharya

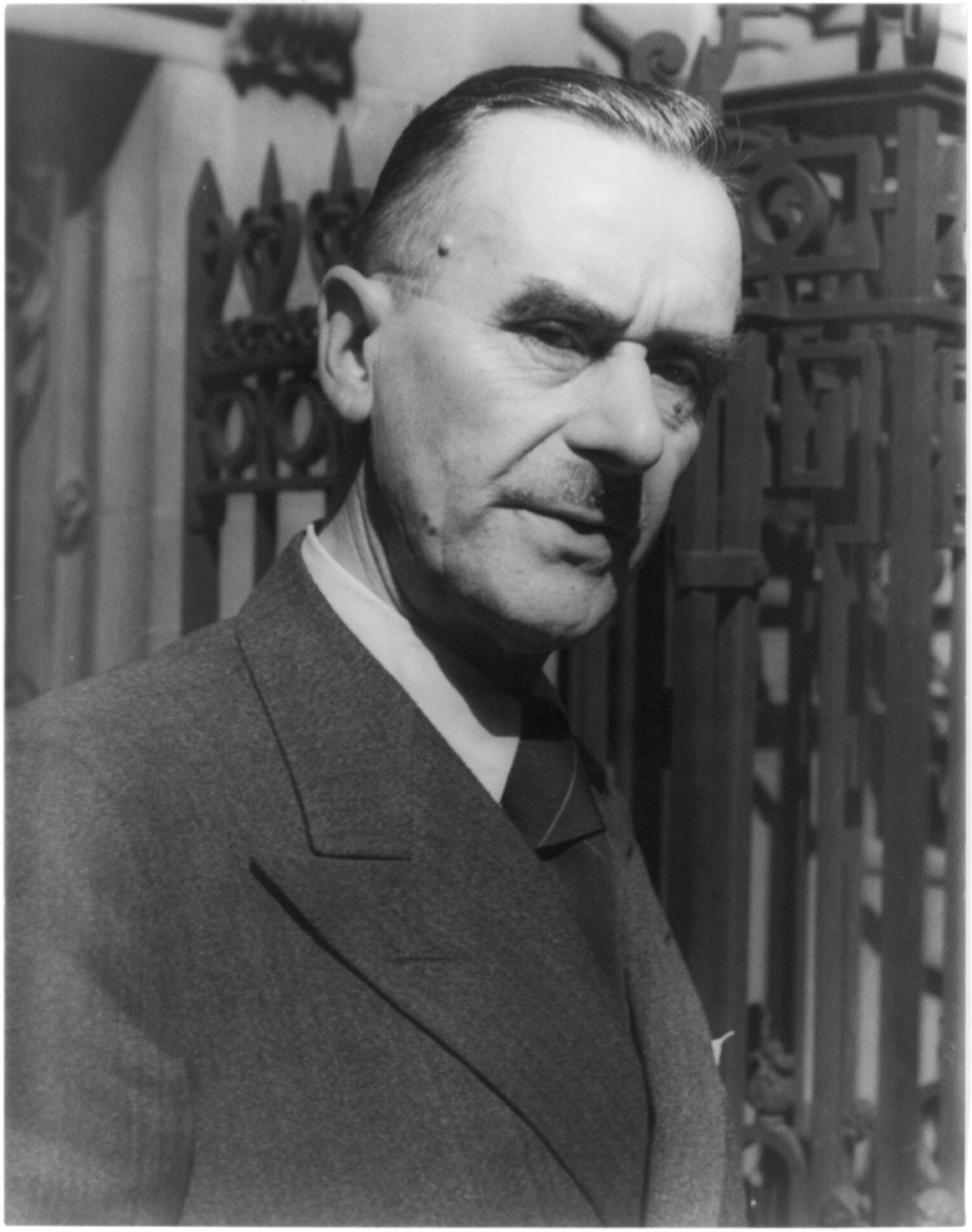
Thomas Mann

- May 2 – Owen Roberts, Associate Justice of the Supreme Court of the United States (d. 1955)
- May 6 – William D. Leahy, American admiral (d. 1959)
- May 11 – Harriet Quimby, American pilot (d. 1912)
- May 12
  - Krishna Chandra Bhattacharya, Indian philosopher (d. 1949)
  - Charles Holden, English architect (d. 1960)
- May 23 – Alfred P. Sloan, American automobile industrialist (d. 1966)
- June 4 – Albert E. Smith, English stage magician, film director and producer (d. 1958)
- June 6
  - J. Farrell MacDonald, American character actor, film director (d. 1952)
  - Thomas Mann, German novelist, Nobel Prize laureate (d. 1955)
- June 9 – Henry Hallett Dale, English pharmacologist and physiologist, Nobel Prize laureate (d. 1968)
- June 12 – Sam De Grasse, Canadian actor (d. 1953)
- June 15 – Herman Smith-Johannsen, Norwegian supercentenarian (d. 1987)
- June 24 – Diedrich Westermann, German linguist (d. 1956)
- June 28 – Henri Lebesgue, French mathematician (d. 1941)

=== July–August ===
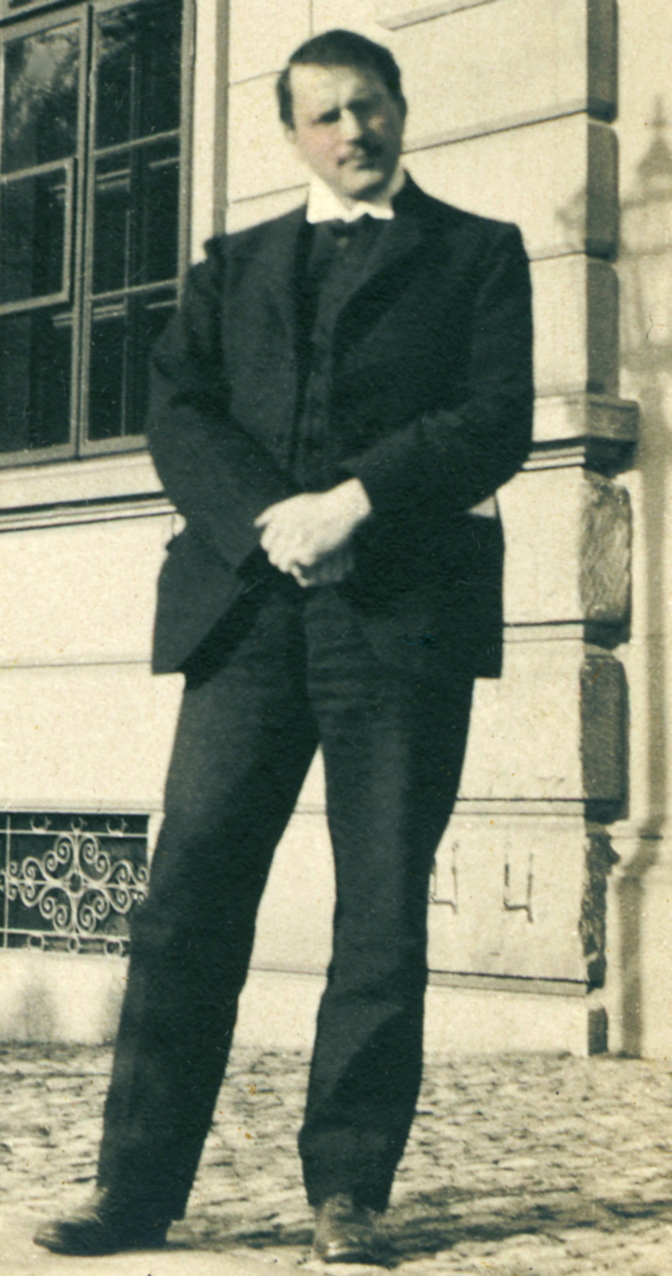
Carl Jung

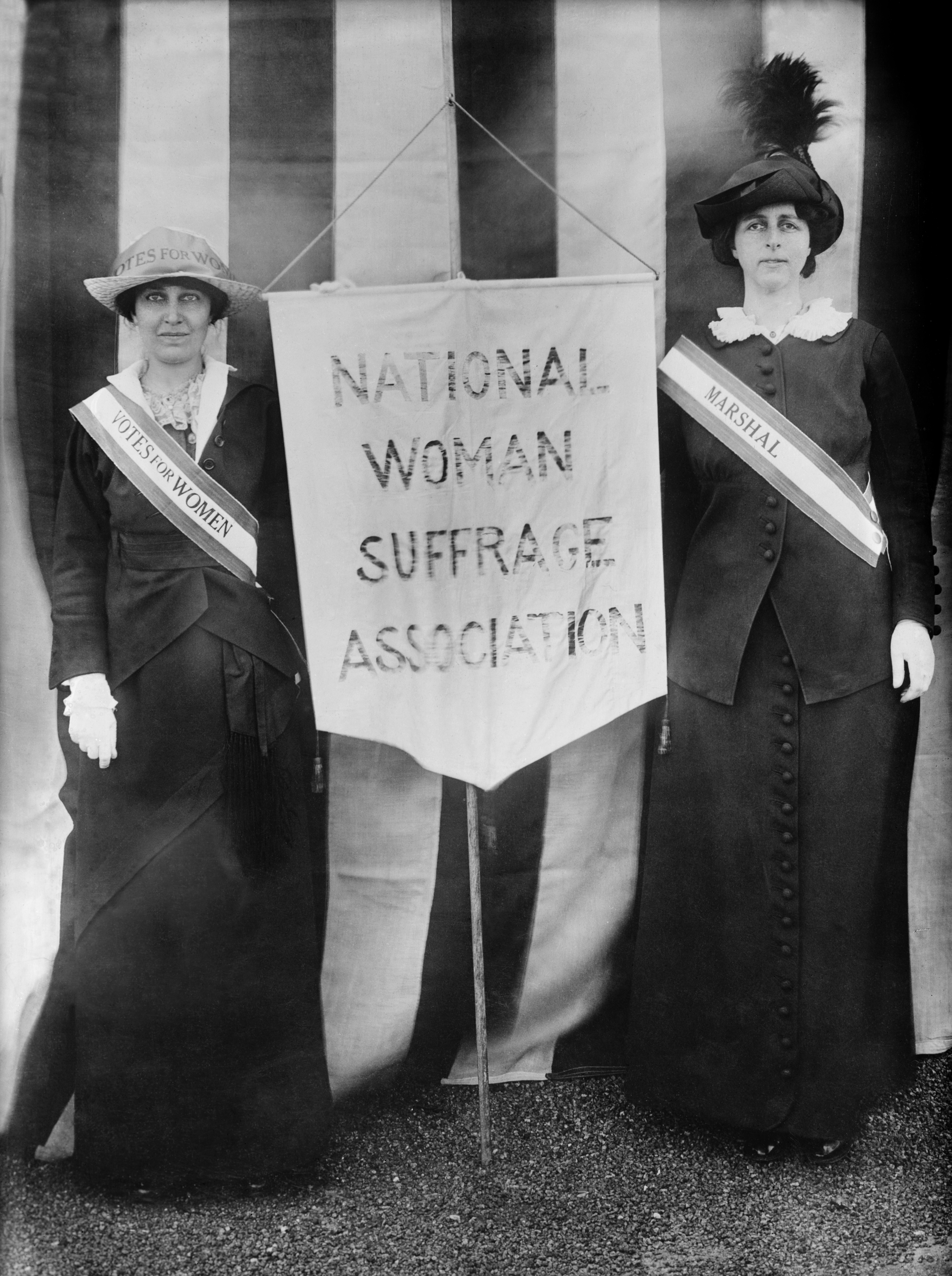
Katharine McCormick

- July 3
  - Tanxu, Chinese Buddhist monk (d. 1963)
  - Ferdinand Sauerbruch, German surgeon (d. 1951)
- July 10
  - Dezső Pattantyús-Ábrahám, Hungarian politician (d. 1973)
  - Mary McLeod Bethune, American educator (d. 1955)
- July 25 – Jim Corbett, Anglo-Indian hunter, conservationist and author (d. 1955)
- July 26
  - Carl Jung, Swiss psychiatrist (d. 1961)
  - Antonio Machado, Spanish poet (d. 1939)
- August 8 – Artur Bernardes, 12th President of Brazil (d. 1955)
- August 10 – Florrie Forde, Australian-born music hall singer (d. 1940)
- August 15 – Samuel Coleridge-Taylor, English composer (d. 1912)
- August 16 – Juho Sunila, former Prime Minister of Finland (d. 1936)
- August 21 – Winnifred Eaton, Canadian author (d. 1954)
- August 26 – John Buchan, Scottish-Canadian novelist, historian and politician, 15th Governor General of Canada (d. 1940)
- August 27 – Katharine McCormick, American suffragist (d. 1967)
- August 29 – Leonardo De Lorenzo, Italian flautist (d. 1962)
- August 31 – Rosa Lemberg, Namibian-born Finnish American teacher, singer and choral conductor (d. 1959)

=== September–October ===
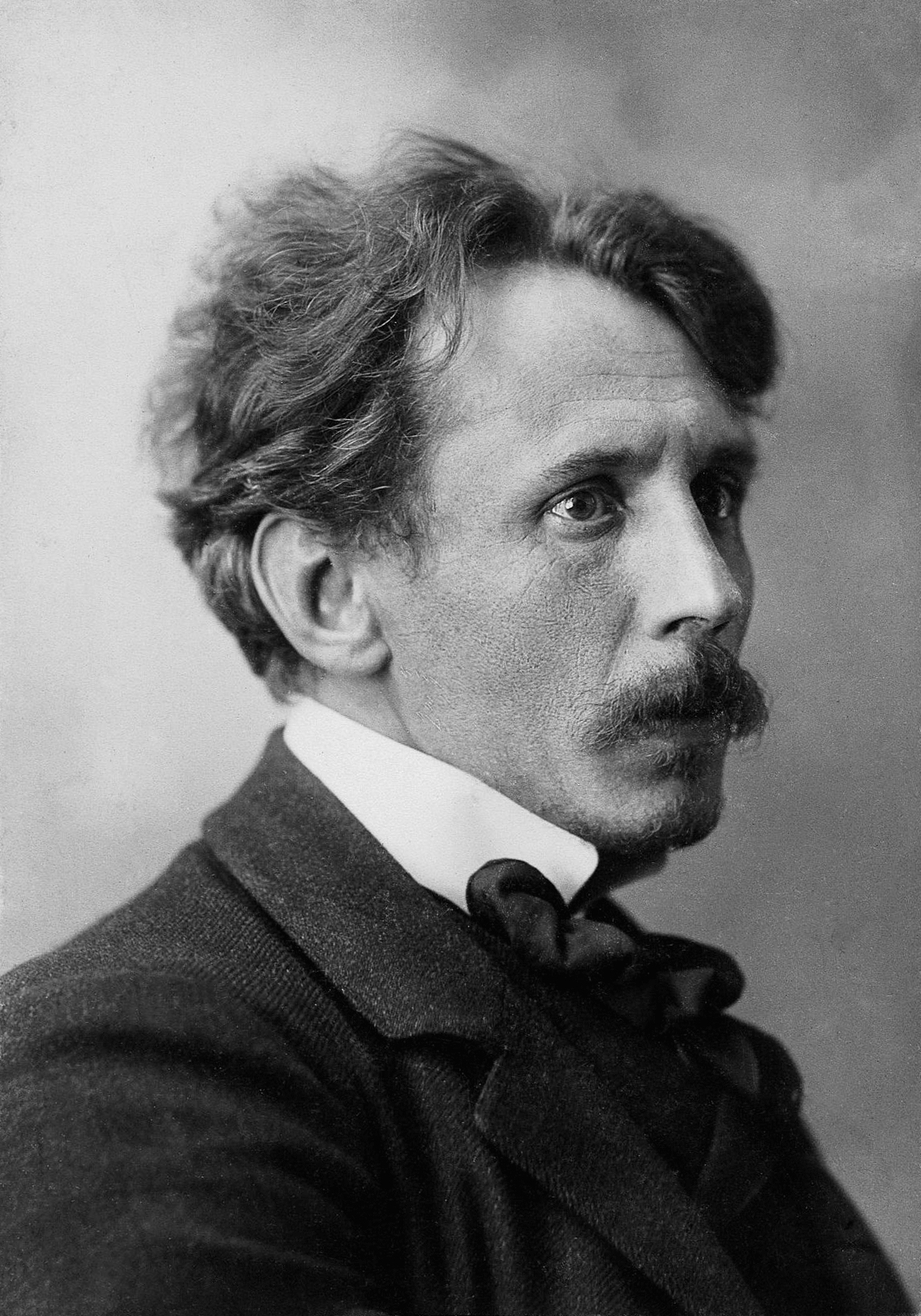
Mikalojus Konstantinas Čiurlionis

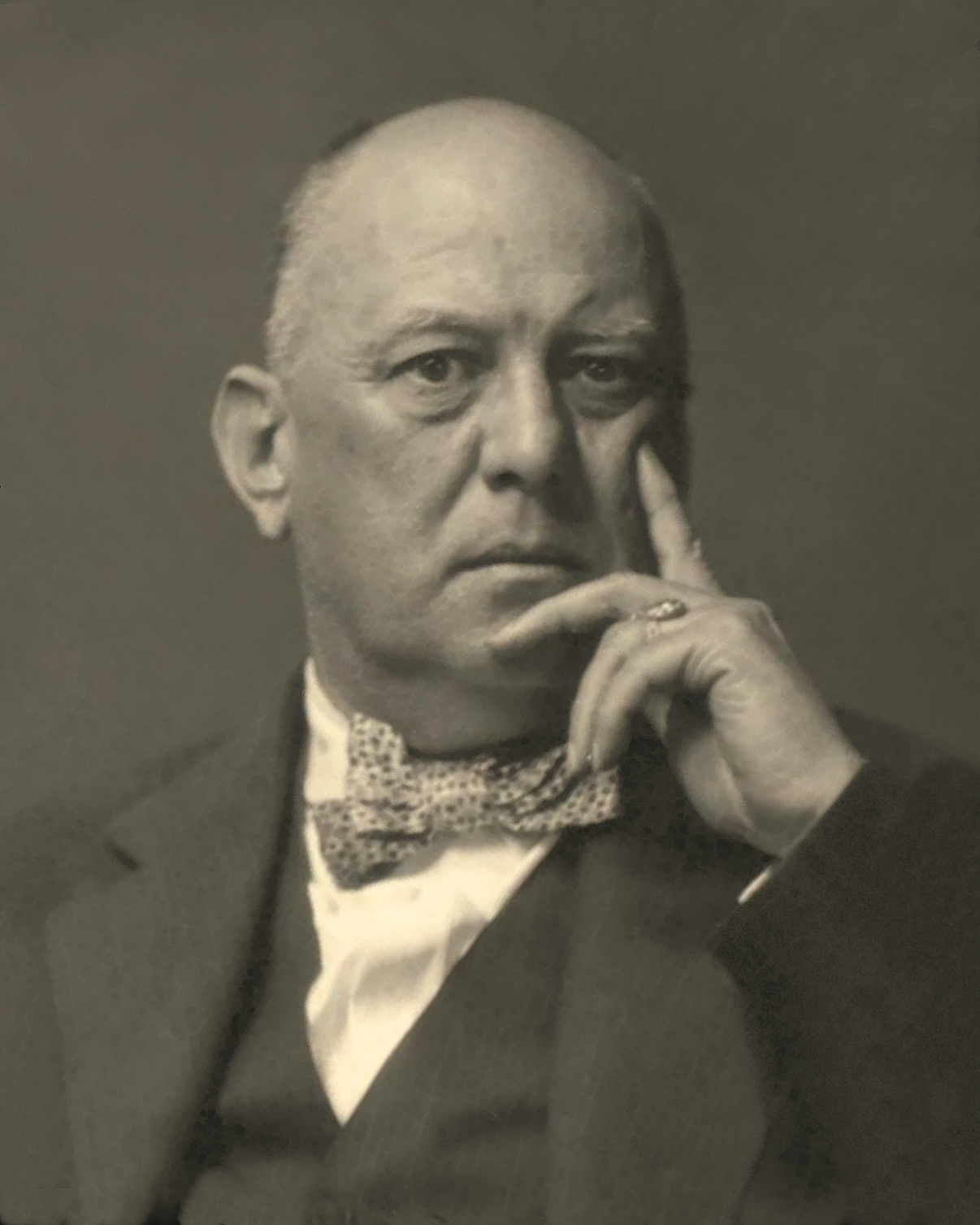
Aleister Crowley

- September 1 – Edgar Rice Burroughs, American fiction writer (d. 1950)
- September 3 – Ferdinand Porsche, Austrian automotive engineer (d. 1951)
- September 16 – James Cash Penney, American businessman, founder of J. C. Penney (d. 1971)
- September 18 – Tomás Burgos, Chilean philanthropist (d. 1945)
- September 20 – Matthias Erzberger, German politician (assassinated 1921)
- September 22 – Mikalojus Konstantinas Čiurlionis, Lithuanian composer (d. 1911)
- October 1 – Eugeen Van Mieghem, Belgian painter (d. 1930)
- October 12 – Aleister Crowley, British occultist (d. 1947)
- October 18 – James Emman Kwegyir Aggrey, Ghanaian-born educationalist (d. 1927)
- October 19 – George Ranetti, Romanian poet, publicist (d. 1928)
- October 23 – Gilbert N. Lewis, American chemist (d. 1946)
- October 31 – Vallabhbhai Patel, Indian political leader ("Iron Man of India") (d. 1950)

=== November–December ===
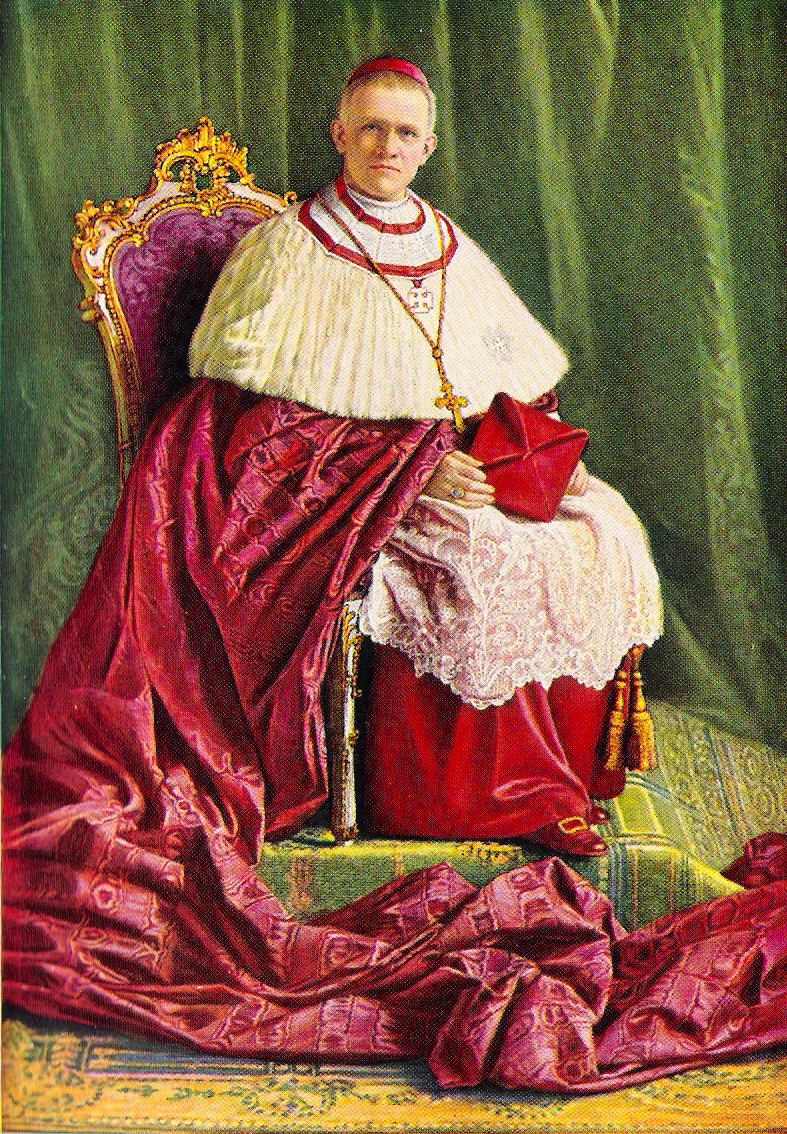
Theodor Innitzer

- November 6 – Marie Celeste, American soprano and actress (d. 1954)
- November 8 – Qiu Jin, Chinese revolutionary, writer and feminist (executed 1907)
- November 14 – Gregorio del Pilar, Filipino general (k. in action 1899)
- November 17 – Birger Eriksen, Norwegian military officer, sinker of the Blücher (d. 1958)
- November 30 – Otto Strandman, 1st Prime Minister of Estonia (d. 1941)
- December 4 – Rainer Maria Rilke, Austrian poet (d. 1926)
- December 5 – Arthur Currie, Canadian general (d. 1933)
- December 6 – Evelyn Underhill, British writer (d. 1941)
- December 11 – Yehuda Leib Maimon, Bassarabian-born Israeli rabbi, government minister (d. 1962)
- December 12 – Gerd von Rundstedt, German field marshal (d. 1953)
- December 15 – Emilio Jacinto, Filipino poet, revolutionary (d. 1899)
- December 19 – Mileva Marić, Albert Einstein's first wife (d. 1948)
- December 24 – Otto Ender, 8th Chancellor of Austria (d. 1960)
- December 25 – Theodor Innitzer, Austrian Catholic cardinal (d. 1955)

== Deaths ==
=== January–June ===
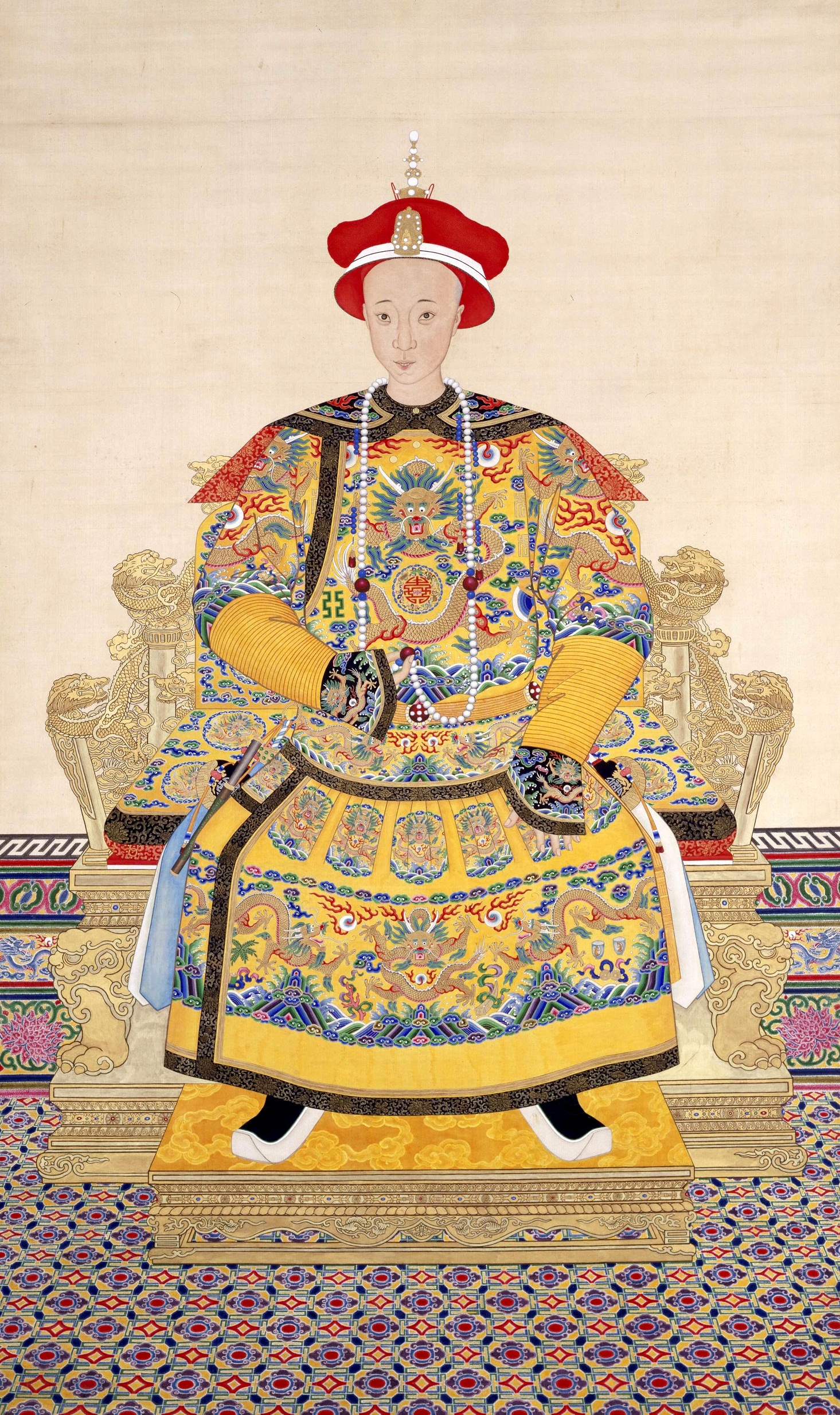
Tongzhi Emperor

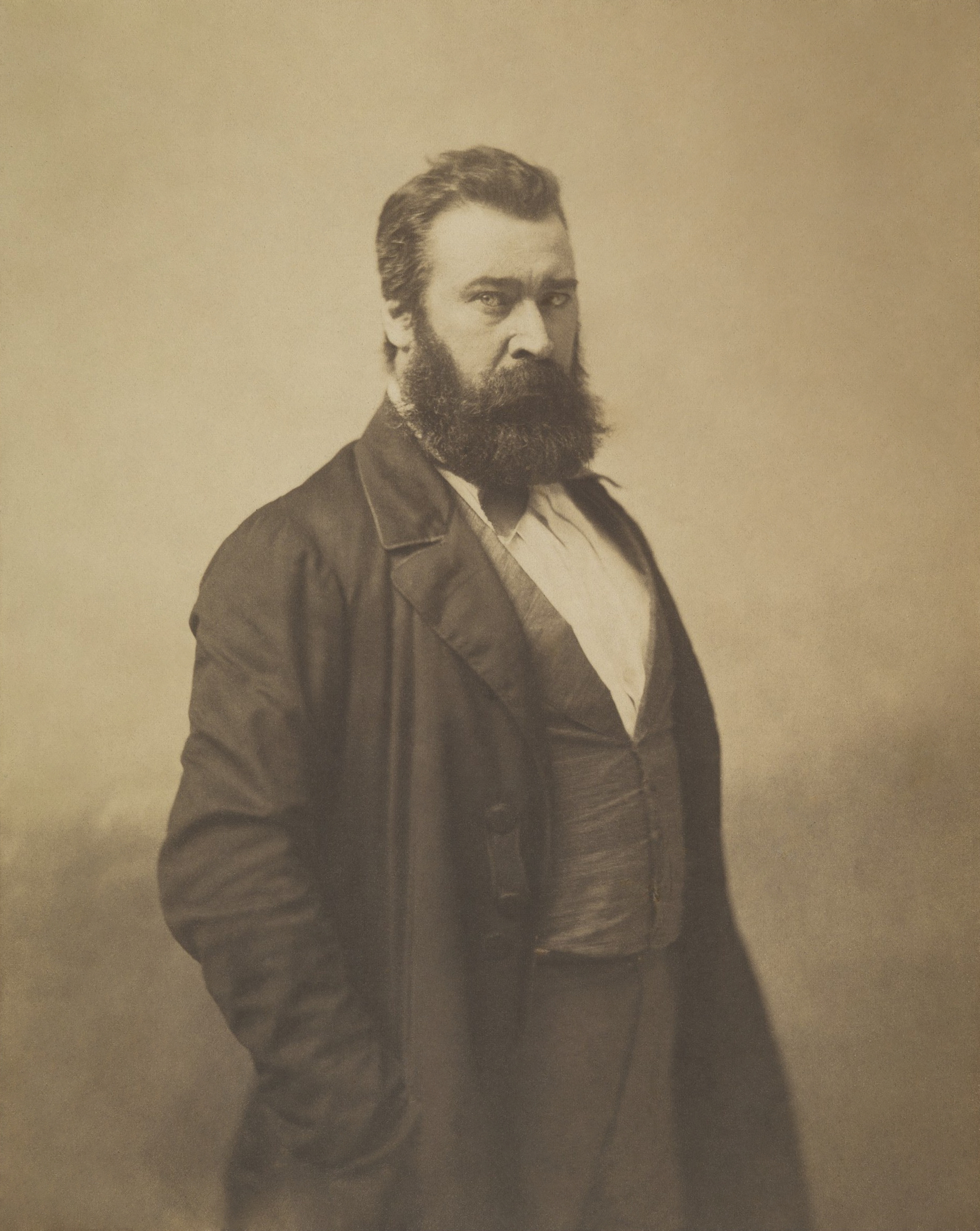
Jean-François Millet

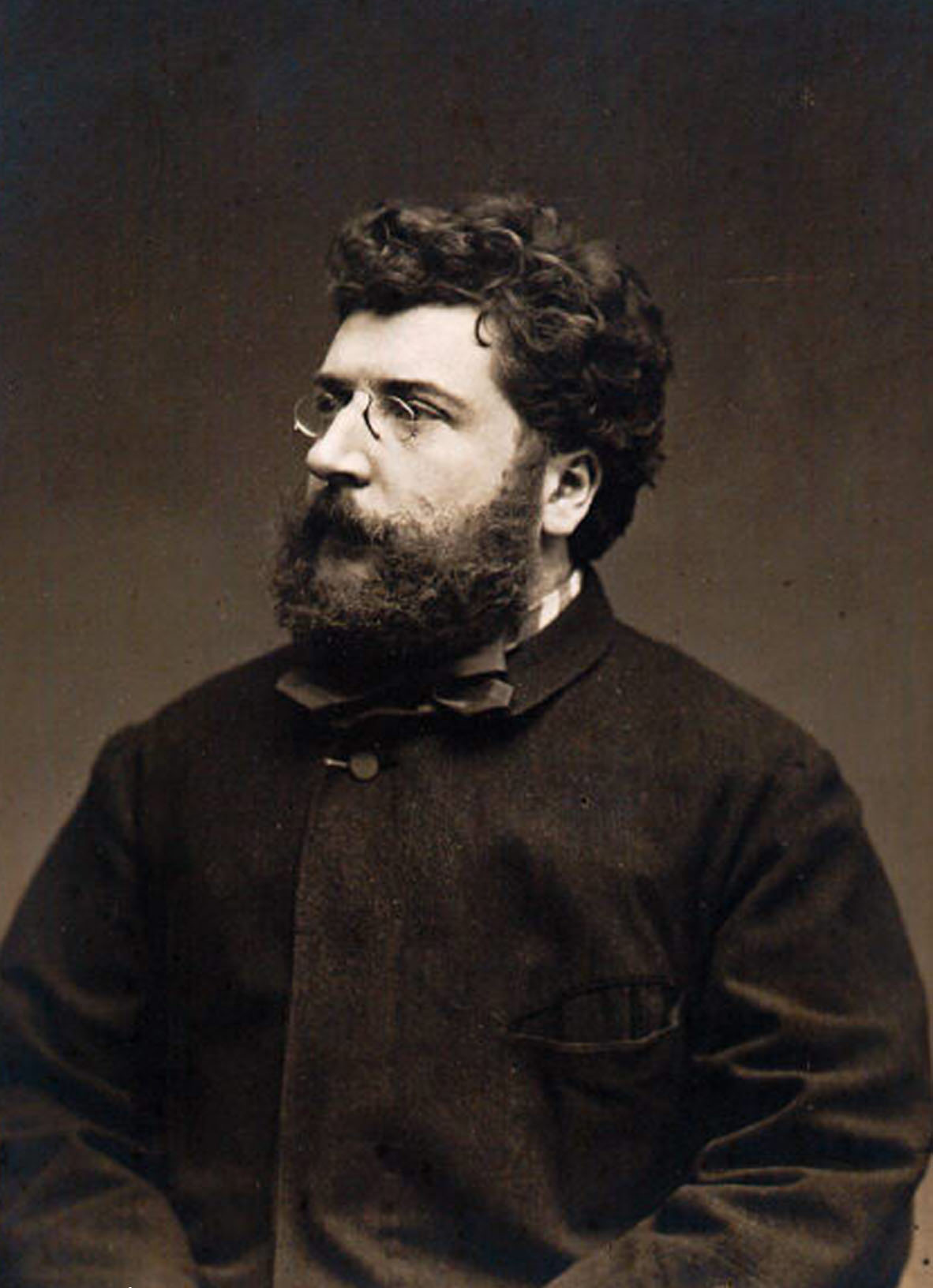
Georges Bizet

- January 12 – Tongzhi Emperor, 8th emperor of Qing dynasty (b. 1856)
- January 20 – Jean-François Millet, French painter (b. 1814)
- January 23 – Charles Kingsley, English writer (b. 1819)
- February 5 – Birgitte Andersen, Danish actress and ballet dancer (b.1791)
- February 7 – Edmund Spangler, American stagehand at Ford's Theatre (b. 1825)
- February 22
  - Jean-Baptiste-Camille Corot, French painter (b. 1796)
  - Sir Charles Lyell, Scottish geologist (b. 1797)
- March 1 – Tristan Corbière, French poet (b. 1845)
- March 27 – Empress Xiaozheyi, Empress Consort of Tongzhi Emperor (b.1854)
- April 4 – Karl Mauch, German explorer (b. 1837)
- April 17 – Marija Milutinović Punktatorka, Serbian lawyer (b. 1810)
- April 25 – the 12th Dalai Lama (b. 1857)
- May 17 – John C. Breckinridge, 14th Vice President of the United States, Confederate States Secretary of War (b. 1821)
- May 20 – Amalia of Oldenburg, Greek queen (b. 1818)
- May 26 – Victoriano Sánchez Barcáiztegui, Spanish Navy officer and hero (killed in action) (b. 1826)
- May 31 – Eliphas Lévi, French occult author, magician (b. 1810)
- June 2 – Józef Kremer, Polish philosopher (b. 1806)
- June 3 – Georges Bizet, French composer (b. 1838)
- June 4 – Eduard Mörike, German poet (b. 1804)
- June 25 – Antoine-Louis Barye, French sculptor (b. 1796)
- June 29 – Ferdinand I of Austria, Emperor of Austria (b. 1793)

=== July–December ===
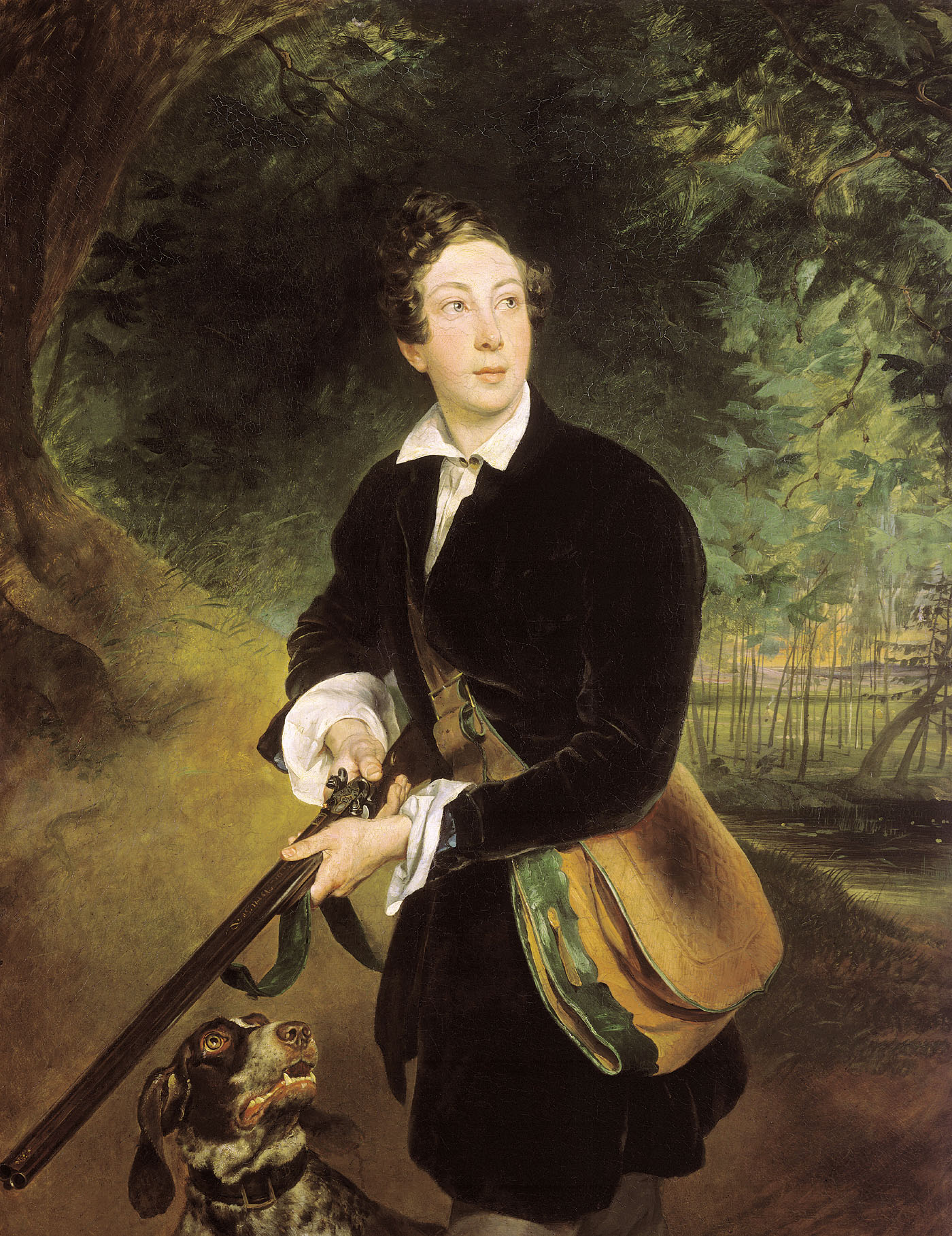
Aleksey Konstantinovich Tolstoy

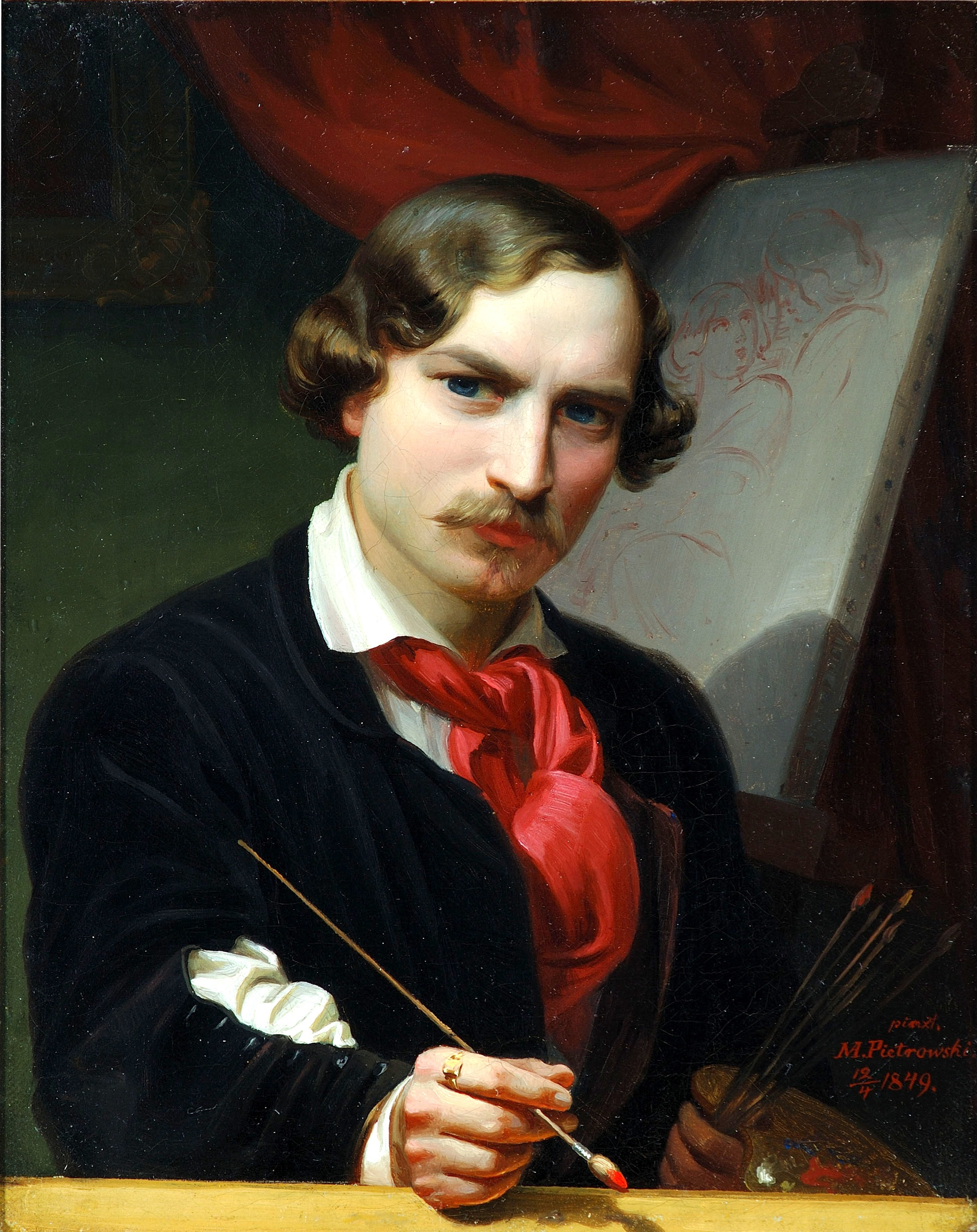
Maximilian Piotrowski

- July 8 – Francis Preston Blair Jr., American politician, Civil War officer (b. 1821)
- July 29 – Paschal Beverly Randolph, American occultist (b. 1825)
- July 30 – George Pickett, American Confederate general (b. 1825)
- July 31 – Andrew Johnson, 17th President of the United States (b. 1808)
- August 4 – Hans Christian Andersen, Danish writer (b. 1805)
- August 6 – Gabriel García Moreno, President of Ecuador (b. 1821)
- August 10 – Karl Andree, German geographer (b. 1808)
- August 11 – William Alexander Graham, United States Senator from North Carolina, (1840–1843), Confederate States Senator (1864–1865) (b. 1804)
- August 12 – János Kardos, Hungarian Slovenes evangelic priest, teacher and writer (b. 1801)
- August 16 – Prince Karl Theodor of Bavaria, Bavarian field marshal (b. 1795)
- August 17 – Wilhelm Bleek, German linguist (b. 1827)
- August 25 – Charles Auguste Frossard, French general (b. 1807)
- August 27 – William Chapman Ralston, American banker and financier (b. 1826)
- September 12 – Chauncey Wright, American philosopher and mathematician (b. 1830)
- September 22 – Charles Bianconi, Italian-Irish entrepreneur (b. 1786)
- October 10 – Aleksey Konstantinovich Tolstoy, Russian writer (b. 1817)
- October 12 – Jean-Baptiste Carpeaux, French sculptor, painter (b. 1827)
- October 15 – Chief Lone Horn, Native American Chief (b. 1790)
- October 19 – Sir Charles Cowper, Australian politician, Premier of New South Wales (b. 1807)
- October 24 – Jacques Paul Migne, French priest, theologian, and publisher (b. 1800)
- November 14 – Werner Munzinger, Swiss adventurer (b. 1832)
- November 21 – Orris S. Ferry, American Civil War general and politician (b. 1823)
- November 22 – Henry Wilson, 18th Vice President of the United States (b. 1812)
- November 24 – William Backhouse Astor, Sr., American businessman (b. 1792)
- November 27 – Richard Christopher Carrington, English astronomer (b. 1826)
- November 29 – Maximilian Piotrowski, Polish painter, Kunstakademie Königsberg professor (b. 1813)
- December 13 – Théonie Rivière Mignot, American restaurateur and businesswoman (b. 1819)
- December 25 – Young Tom Morris, Scottish golfer (b. 1851)
