= Clara Andersen =

Danish playwright

Clara Elisabeth Andersen
- Born: 13 May 1826; Copenhagen, Denmark
- Died: 28 August 1895 (aged 69); Copenhagen, Denmark
- Occupations: Dramatist; novelist; short story writer
- Writing career
- Pen name: Paul Winther
- Language: Danish
- Period: 19th century
- Genres: Drama; novel; short story
- Notable work: Rosa og Rosita

Clara Elisabeth Andersen (13 May 1826 – 28 August 1895) was a Danish dramatist and novelist. Thanks to the many plays she wrote, she became the most successful female Danish playwright of the 19th century. Her Rosa og Rosita (1862) was performed more than a hundred times at the Royal Danish Theatre. She remained unknown to the general public during her lifetime as her plays were written anonymously and her novels and short stories were published under the pen-name Paul Winther.

== Biography ==
Born in Copenhagen on 13 May 1826, Clara Elisabeth Andersen was the daughter of the musician Casper Heinrich Bernhard Andersen, who played the French horn at the Royal Theatre, and the actress Birgitte Andersen, who performed there.

Andersen began writing plays while still young. In 1848, she sent En Evadatter to the poet Henrik Hertz who encouraged her to continue. She became acquainted with the dramatist Frederik Høedt who had the play performed at the Royal Court Theatre in 1855. It became one of the most popular plays written by a woman. Based on how a performance of Hamlet was perceived by London aristocrats, it was well received by the critics. Her most successful play, Rosa og Rosita, was staged at the Royal Theatre in 1862 but was also performed in Vienna, Berlin, Breslau and Kristiania. Most of her theatrical works were staged at the Royal Theatre where they were well received.

Adopting the pen-name Paul Winther, she published a collection of short stories titled Noveller in 1855 as well as the novel Kastaniebaandet (English: The Chestnut Band) in 1861.

In later years, she lived alone in a Viennese boarding house but continued to take an interest in the theatre. She died in Copenhagen on 28 August 1895, still unknown as a playwright. She left a considerable sum to charity.

== Works ==
- En Evadatter (1855)
- Noveller (1855)
- En Velgørers Testamente (1858)
- Kastaniebaandet (1861)
- Rosa og Rosita (1862)
- En Teaterhistorie under Ludvig den XIV (1862)
- En nyttig Onkel (1870)
- Grøns Fødselsdag (1870)
- De lykkeligste Børn (1871)
- Sandt og usandt (1873)
