= Edith Stedham =

English housekeeper and businessperson

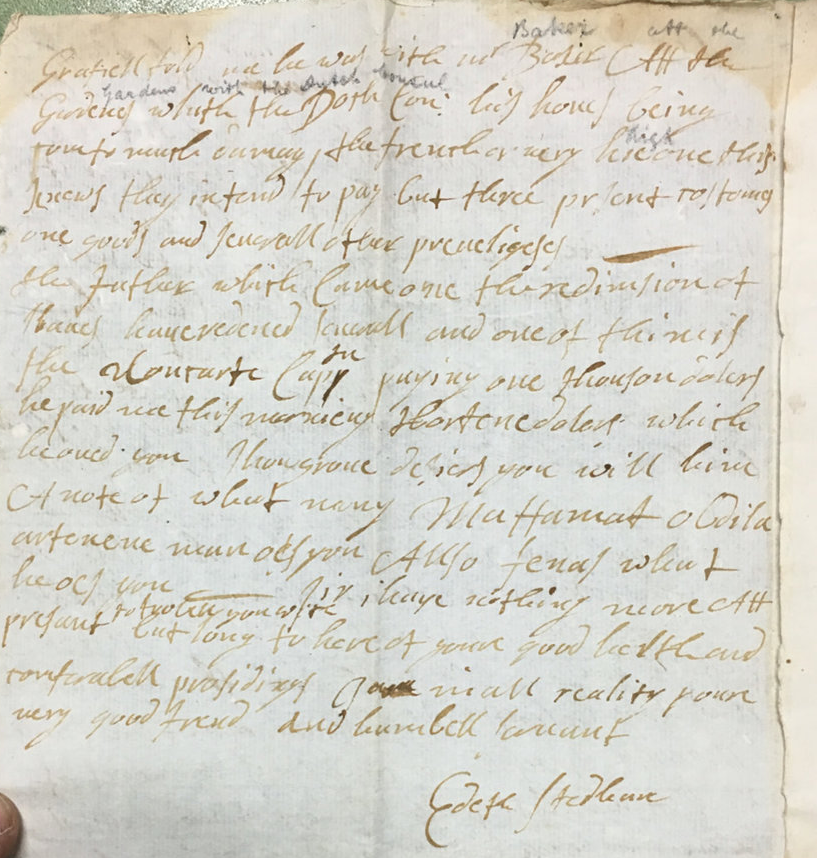
- Edith Stedham's 1685 letter to Thomas Goodwyn
- Born: 1600s England
- Died: 1695; Tunis, Tunisia
- Employer: British consulate in Tunis
- Spouses: Mr Stedham; Thomas Goodwyn
- Children: Urania Goodwyn

Edith Stedham (died 1695) was an English housekeeper and businessperson in Tunis. She was the first well-documented English woman to live there and her daughter was the first free British woman born in Tunis.

== Life ==
Stedham was presumably born in England, but the year, her parents and the place are unknown. She doesn't come to notice until she married a Mr Stedham and that marriage ended in separation. She was left on her own and she took the remarkable step of going to work in Tunis before 1679. She is thought to be the first British woman to do this. The consul was at the former British Consulate in Tunis. Every other British person living in Tunis was male. She met there Thomas Goodwyn. He was a British trader who had recently moved to Tripoli from Livorno at the invitation of the British Consul Thomas Baker but after a year he moved on to Tunis in September 1679. Tunis had a larger British community. Goodwyn is particularly notable as he was a prolific letter writer and his letters are extant.

Edith was employed as the consul's housekeeper but she was not a mere servant. She is shown equal status to the men in the household and in time she began to trade on her own account. She bought hundreds of pounds worth of wheat and fine British cloth. She and Goodwyn bought land. She was successful and she raised enough money to consider bringing her estranged husband to Tunis.

In 1683 Goodwyn became the consul and he and Edith were close - Urania Goodwyn was born in 1685. Edith was trusted and she would look after the consul when Thomas was away. She and Urania's father Thomas Goodwyn married in 1693.

Stedham died in Tunis and her daughter's future was ensured by her father and his business partner Chetwood. She learned English and maybe Italian and they ensured that she did not marry the middle aged unfaithful Benjamin Lodington who as replacement consul fancied his chances. Her daughter lived until 1742
