= Birgitte Andersen =

Danish stage actor and ballet dancer

Birgitte Elisabeth Andersen
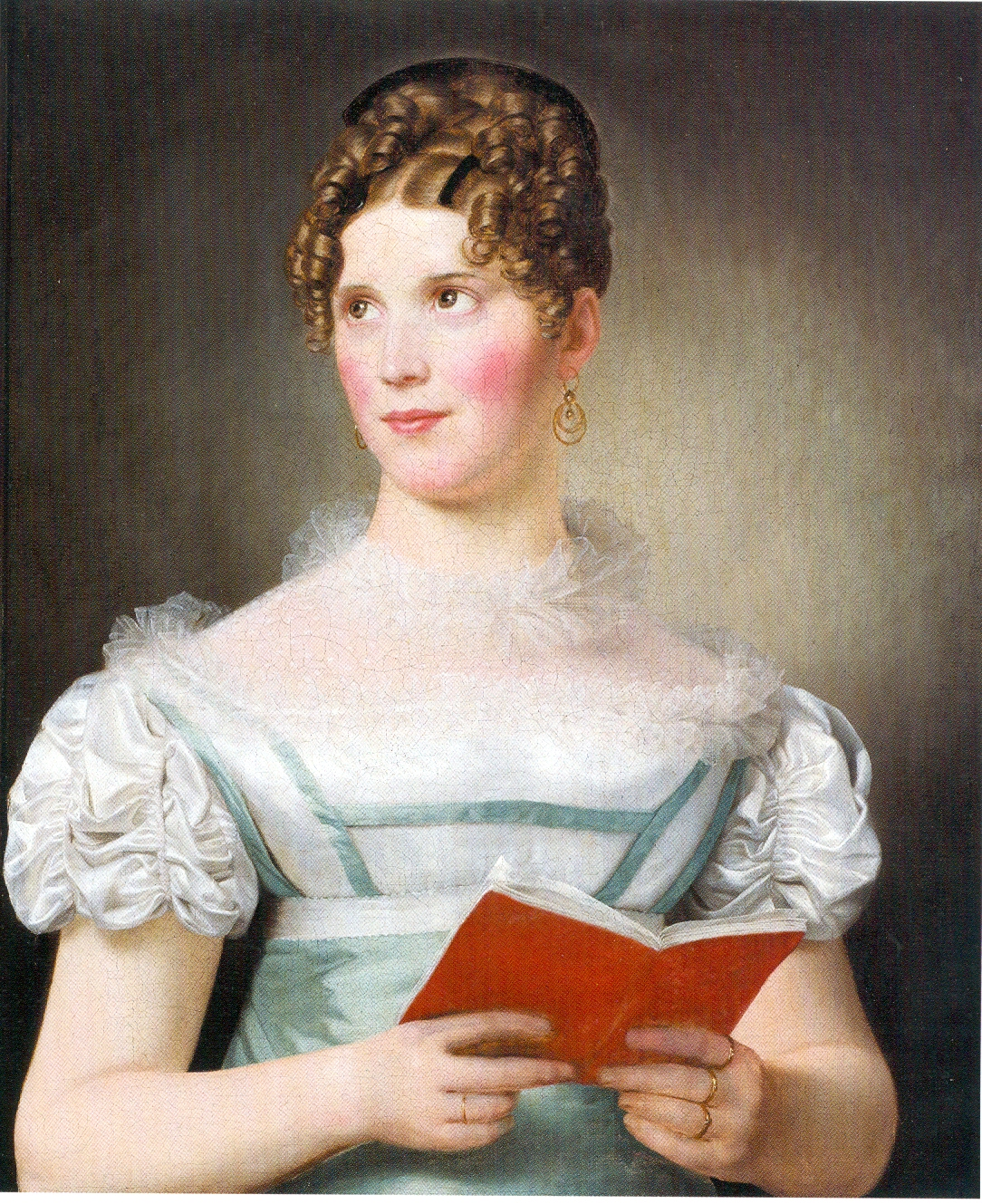
- Portrait by Christoffer Wilhelm Eckersberg, 1821
- Born: Birgitte Elisabeth Olsen; 17 December 1791
- Died: 6 February 1875 (aged 83)
- Children: 5; including Clara Andersen

Birgitte Elisabeth Andersen (née Olsen; 17 December 1791 – 6 February 1875) was a Danish stage actress who performed at the Royal Danish Theatre in Copenhagen from 1808 until her retirement in 1838.

Andersen was one of the first, and most notable students of the Royal Danish Theatre's s school where she trained under Knud Lyne Rahbek. Critics described her as intelligent and noted her beauty and gift for irony. She was deemed best suited for solemn roles. Her training with Rahbek had placed a heavy focus on dialogue, and led her to be criticized as stiff and artificial in her movements.

== Life ==
Birgitte Elisabeth Olsen was born on 17 December 1791. Her mother, Elisabeth Jensen, was Norwegian and her father, Iver Olsen, was a controller at the Royal Danish Theatre. In 1801, at the age of 10, she was accepted at the Royal Danish Ballet school as a student of Antoine Bournonville. In 1804, she was admitted as one of the first students of the school at the Royal Danish Theatre, which had been established by Michael Rosing and Knud Lyne Rahbek. Birgitte is considered to be most significant actor that the school produced and was a favorite of Rahbek's. At the school's first performance on 11 May 1806, she recited the opening prologue "Spring" which had been written by Rahbek, and performed the role of Lucretia in Fruentimmerhævn. Along with other members of the school, she performed in the first of four public rehearsals at the Hofteatret in 1806.

She made her official debut as an actress in 1808 as Gudrun in a production of Adam Oehlenschläger's tragedy Hakon Jarl. In 1810 she was made a royal actress at the Royal Danish Theatre. She was the first Dane to play Portia in 1828, Ofelia in 1813, and Schiller's Jeanne d'Arc in 1819. She made her final on stage appearance on 17 May 1838 as Aunt Harriet Richmond in a production of Adam Oehlenschläger's Tordenskjold. Following her retirement she was awarded a full royal pension.

She married the conductor of the Royal Danish Orchestra, Caspar Heinrich Bernhard Andersen, in 1815. They had five children, including playwright Clara Andersen. As Clara never married, she lived with her mother until Birgitte's death. Birgitte Andersen died on 6 February 1875.
