= Former British Consulate in Tunis =

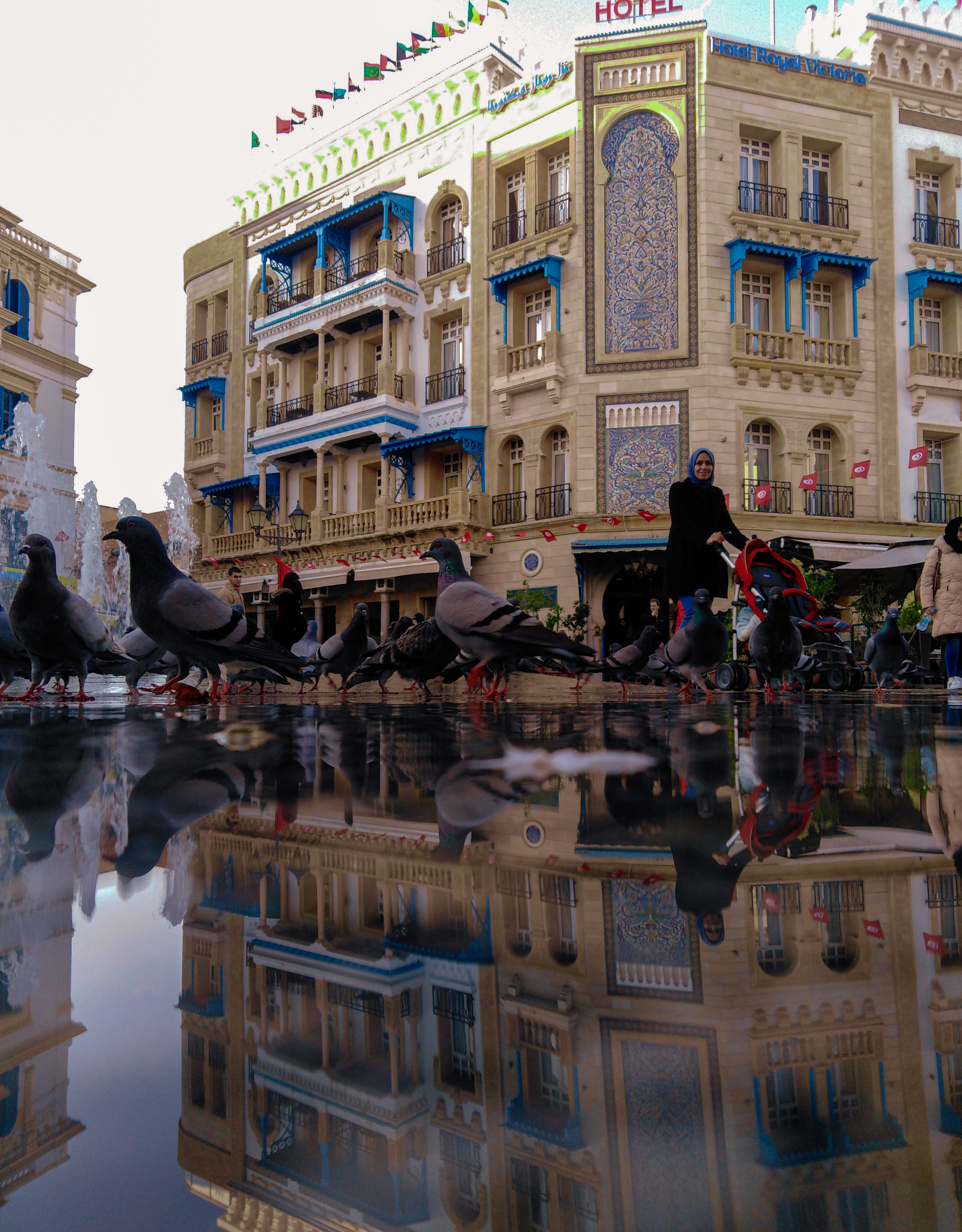
- The building in 2020
- Interactive map of the Former British Consulate in Tunis area

General information
- Type: Consulate
- Architectural style: Moorish revival
- Location: Victory Square, Tunis, Tunisia
- Coordinates: 36.799361°N 10.175484°E
- Completed: 1914

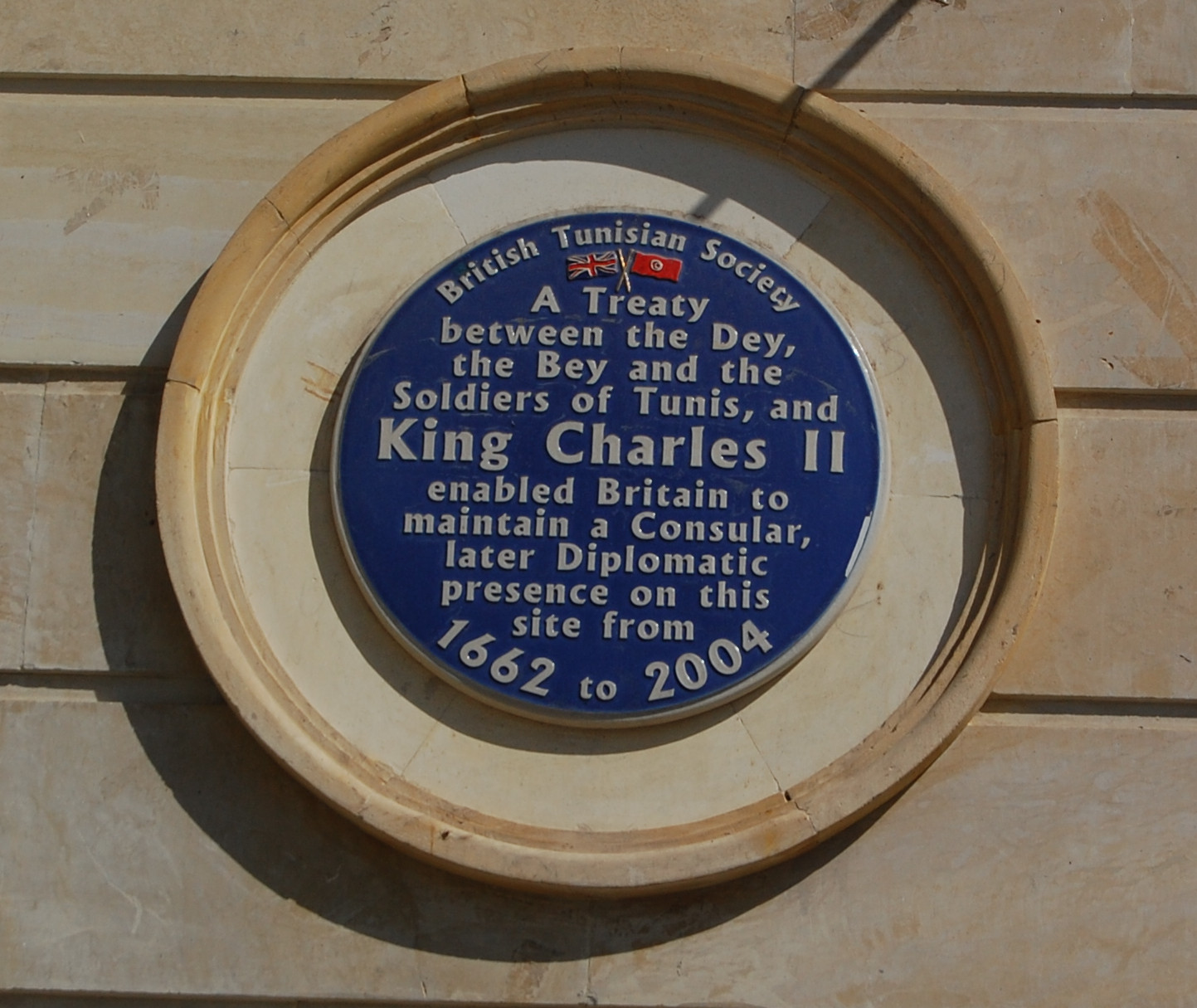
Plaque commemorating the building's use as a consulate and embassy

The former British Consulate is a building that housed the United Kingdom consulate in Tunis, Tunisia, later upgraded to an embassy, following Tunisia's independence in 1956. It is located on Victory Square (formerly Place de la Bourse), adjacent to the medina of Tunis.

== History ==
Diplomatic relations between the Regency of Tunis and the United Kingdom began in 1662, with the signing of a peace treaty. Early consuls included Francis Baker 1673–83 and Thomas Goodwyn who served from 1679 to 1698, James Chetwood briefly and then Goodwyn again until 1700. Goodwyn was to marry the first British woman to live in Tunis, Edith Stedham, and their daughter was the first British girl born there. Goodwyn's 3,000 letters are extant.

The first consulate building was erected in the seventeenth century. It was replaced by a second, in European style, in the early nineteenth century.

The building on Victory Square was erected in 1914, in a Moorish revival style.

In 2003, the embassy moved to the Berges du Lac and the former consulate building was returned to the Tunisian state.
