= Fondouk of French =

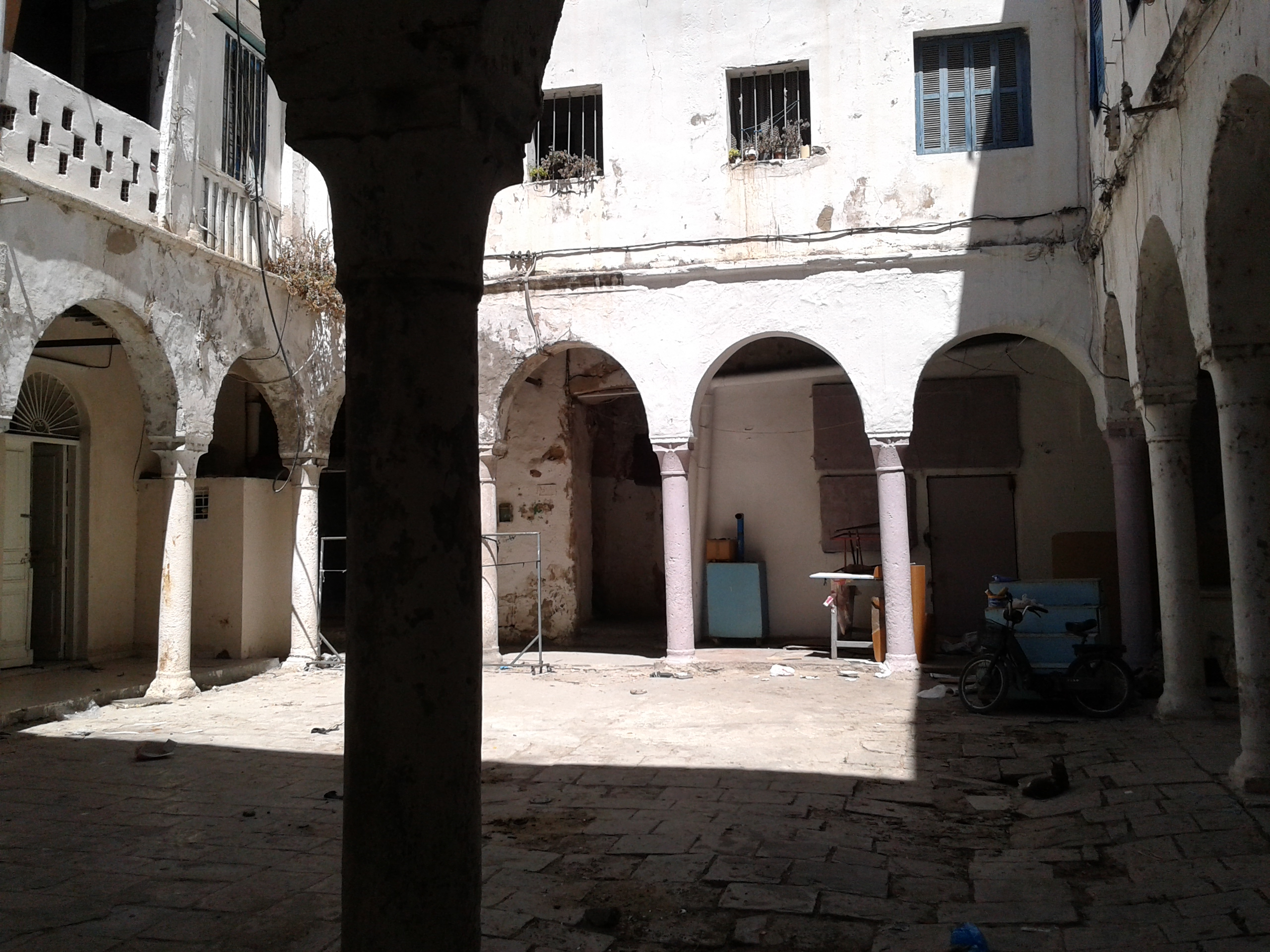
- Interactive map of Fondouk of French
- Location: Tunis

History
- Built: 17th century

Site notes
- Area: Medina of Tunis

The Fondouk of the French is a caravanserai located in the Medina of Tunis in the old French district. It is near Bab El Bhar.

== History ==
The fondouk (also spelled fondaco) was built in 1660.

This fondouk is inspired by the local civil architecture of the seventeenth century.

The fondouk of the merchants is classified as a historical monument since 1922.

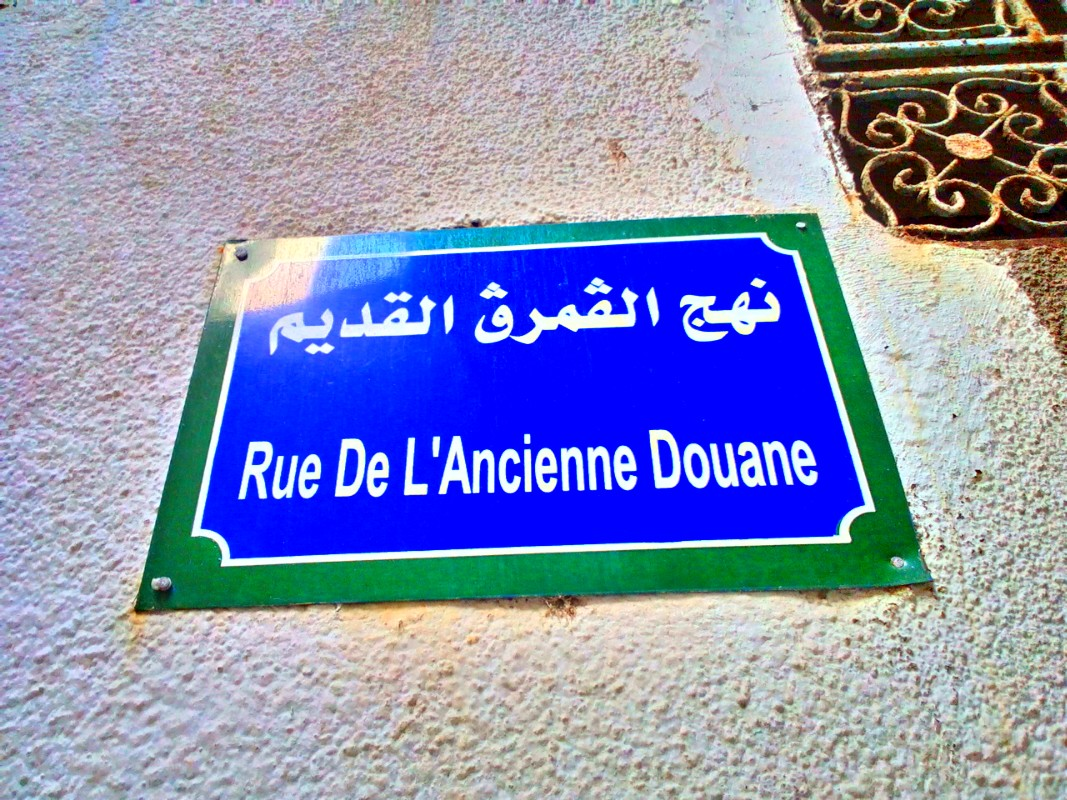
metal plate with the old street name

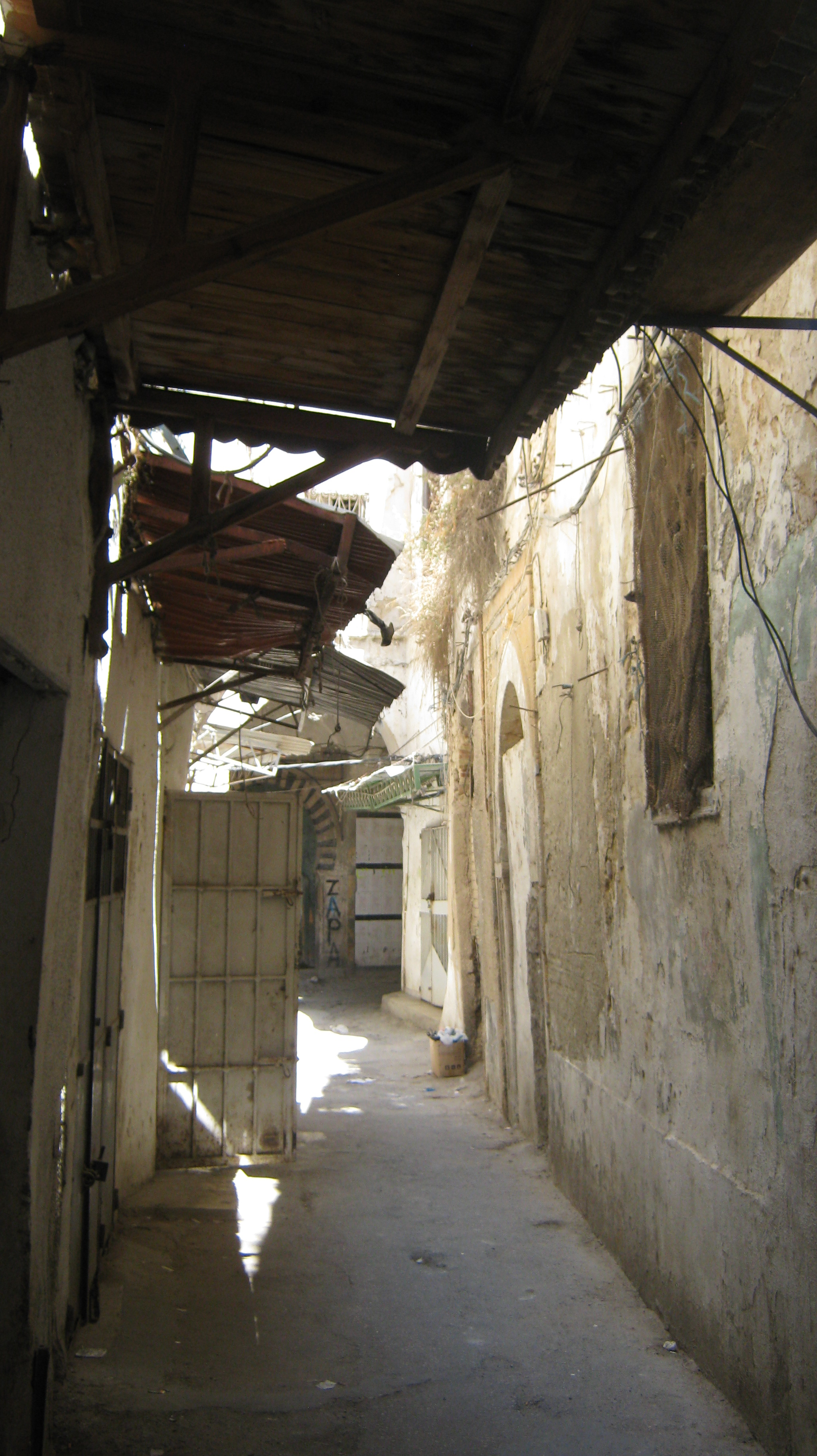
The old Douane street

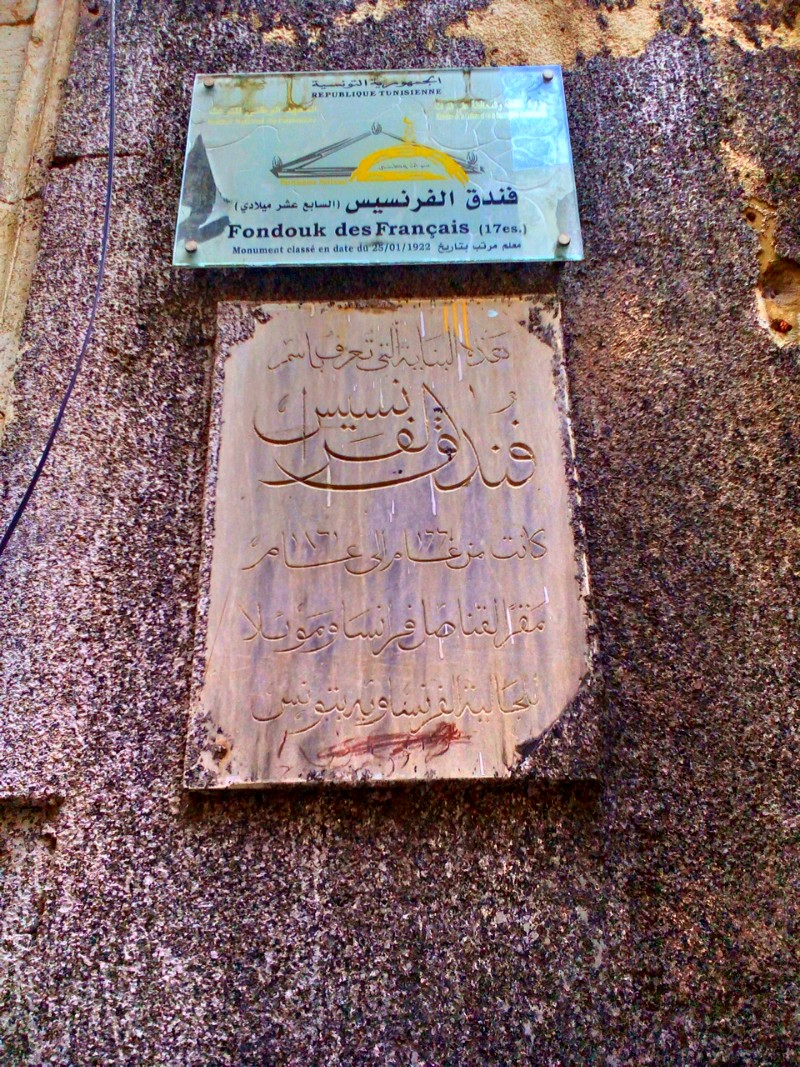
plate of the fondouk

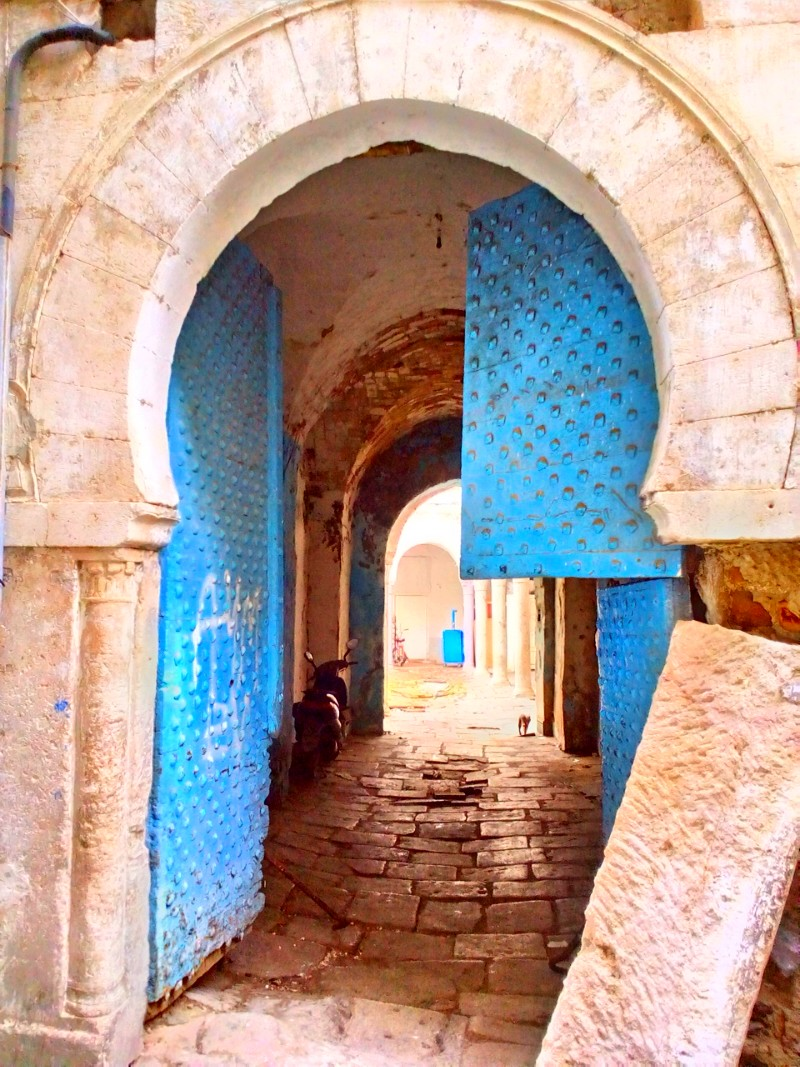
The entrance door of the fondouk

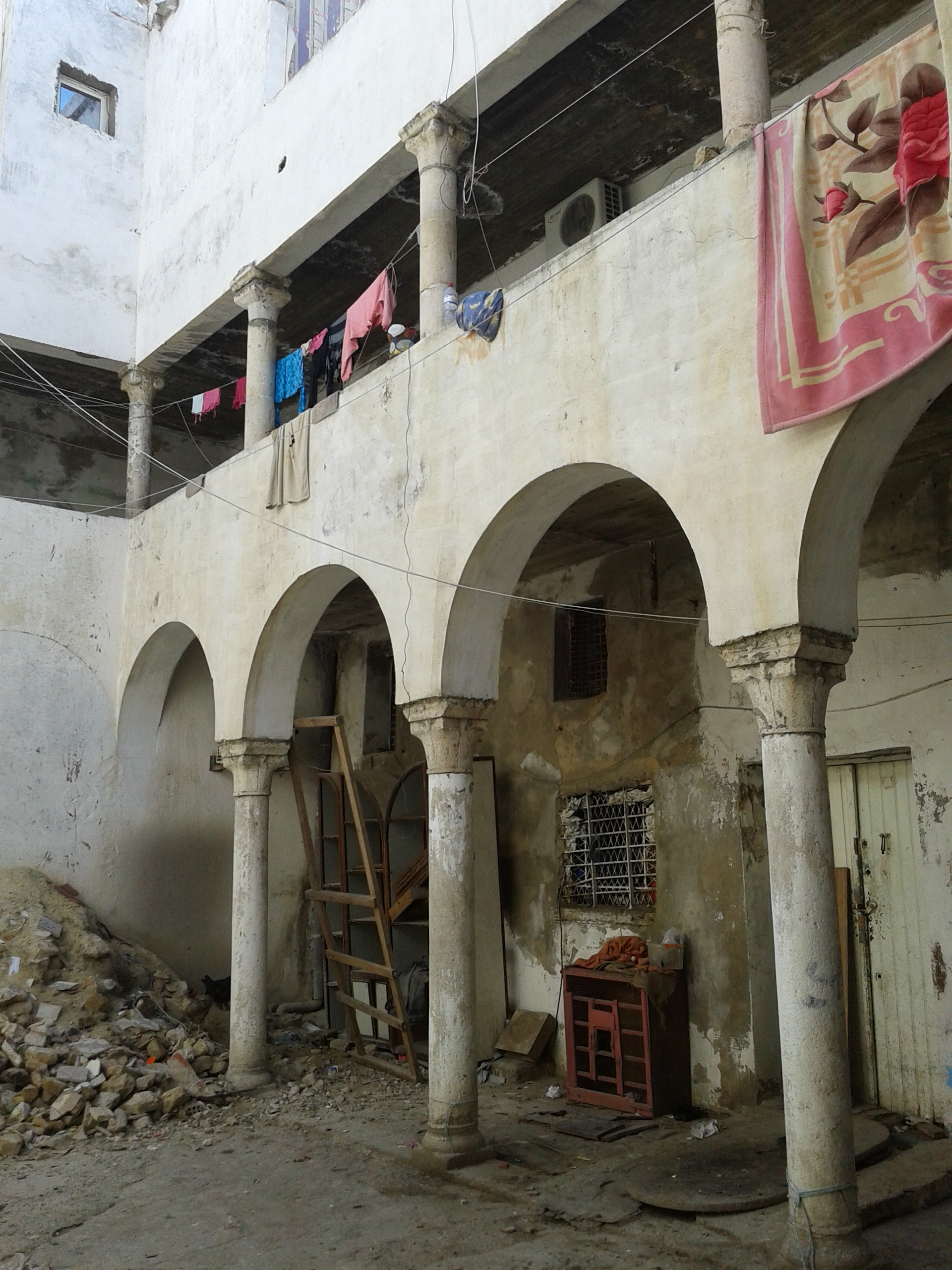
View of the fondouk
