= Marija Milutinović Punktatorka =

Serbian lawyer

Marija Milutinović (1810-1875) née Popović, known as Punktatorka, was a Serbian lawyer. In 1847, she was given special permission to work as a lawyer. She exclusively did pro bono work for charity throughout her career.
