= Krishna Chandra Bhattacharya =

Indian philosopher (1875–1949)

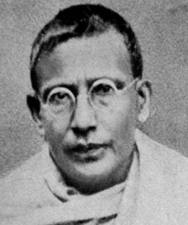
- Krishna Chandra Bhattacharya
- Born: 12 May 1875
- Died: 11 December 1949 (aged 74)

Krishnachandra Bhattacharyya, commonly referred to as K. C. Bhattacharyya, (12 May 1875 – 11 December 1949), was a modern Indian philosopher affiliated with the University of Calcutta. He gained renown for his method of "constructive interpretation," a scholarly approach employed to elucidate and elaborate upon the interrelationships and intricacies inherent in ancient Indian philosophical systems. This method facilitated an examination of these systems akin to the scrutiny applied to contemporary philosophical problems. Bhattacharyya dedicated particular attention to the inquiry into the manner in which the mind (or consciousness) engenders what appears to be a material universe. Notably, Bhattacharyya advocated for an immersive cosmopolitanism, wherein Indian philosophical frameworks were contemporised through a process of assimilation and immersion, eschewing a mere replication of European ideas in favour of a more nuanced integration.

== Early life ==
Bhattacharyya, born on 12 May 1875 in Serampore into a family distinguished for its Sanskrit scholarship, received his early education in a local school. Subsequently, having successfully completed the matriculation examination in 1891, he matriculated to the Presidency College, an institution then associated with the University of Calcutta.

It is noteworthy that Bhattacharya was the father of Kalidas Bhattacharyya, a prominent philosopher.

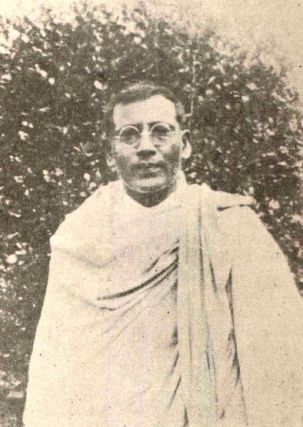

== Swaraj in Ideas ==
During a period marked by escalating demands for India's political emancipation from British colonial dominance, Bhattacharyya articulated a fervent appeal for liberation from what he termed "cultural subjection" – a subtle and nearly imperceptible form of intellectual servitude. This entreaty is encapsulated in "Svarāj in Ideas," an oration delivered in Candranagar in October 1931, although it remained unpublished during Bhattacharyya's lifetime. In elucidating the concept, Bhattacharyya posits that "cultural subjection is ordinarily of an unconscious character and it implies slavery from the very start... There is cultural subjection only when one's traditional cast of ideas and sentiments is superseded without comparison or competition by a new cast representing an alien culture which possesses one like a ghost."

== Subject as Freedom ==
Subject as Freedom was published in 1930. It is almost universally regarded by those who study modern Indian philosophy as the most important philosophical treatise composed in India during the period of British rule. It is a meticulous analysis of the structure of human subjectivity. K. C. Bhattacharyya achieves a remarkable synthesis of neo-Vedantin, Kantian, and Husserlian insights, exploring the role of embodiment, of language, and of introspective consciousness in the achievement of self-knowledge. Nalini Bhushan and Jay Garfield have translated Bhattacharyya's technical work into a more accessible idiom.

=== Controversy ===
Once upon a time, Krishnachandra Bhattacharya, published a pamphlet titled “Udiya Ekti Swatantra Bhasha Noy” (Odia is not an independent language), in which he claimed that Odia was not an independent language but merely a corrupted form of Bengali.

This sparked outrage among Odia literary enthusiasts and intellectuals, who fought to protect the identity, dignity, and existence of their language. That struggle eventually contributed to a historic movement, and Odisha became the first Indian state formed on the basis of linguistic identity in 1936.

== Bibliography ==
- Studies in Sankhya Philosophy
- Studies in Philosophy
- Studies in Vedantism
- Implications of Kant's Philosophy (translation of Kāntdarśaner Tātparya)
- Search for the Absolute in Neo-Vedanta
- Subject as Freedom
