= Theatre Museum in the Court Theatre =

Museum in Copenhagen, Denmark

Coordinates: 55.6748°N 12.5786°E

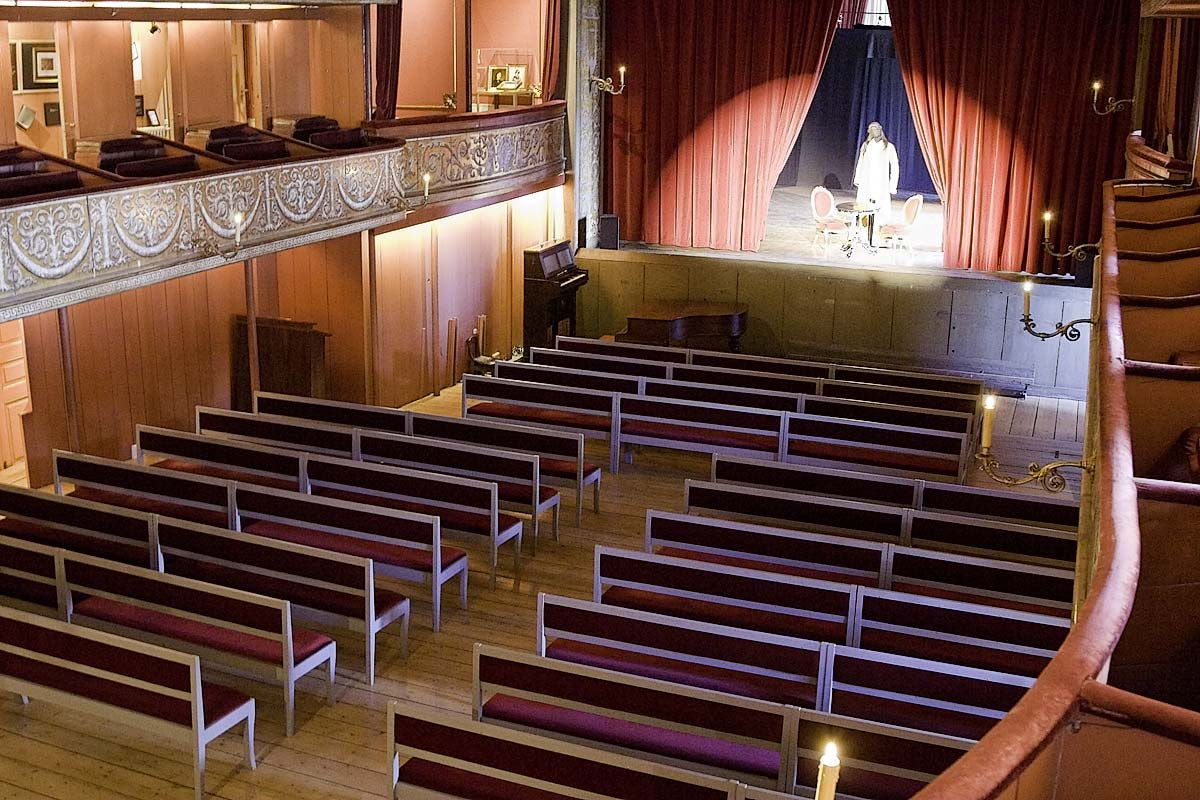
View of the auditorium and stage from a box

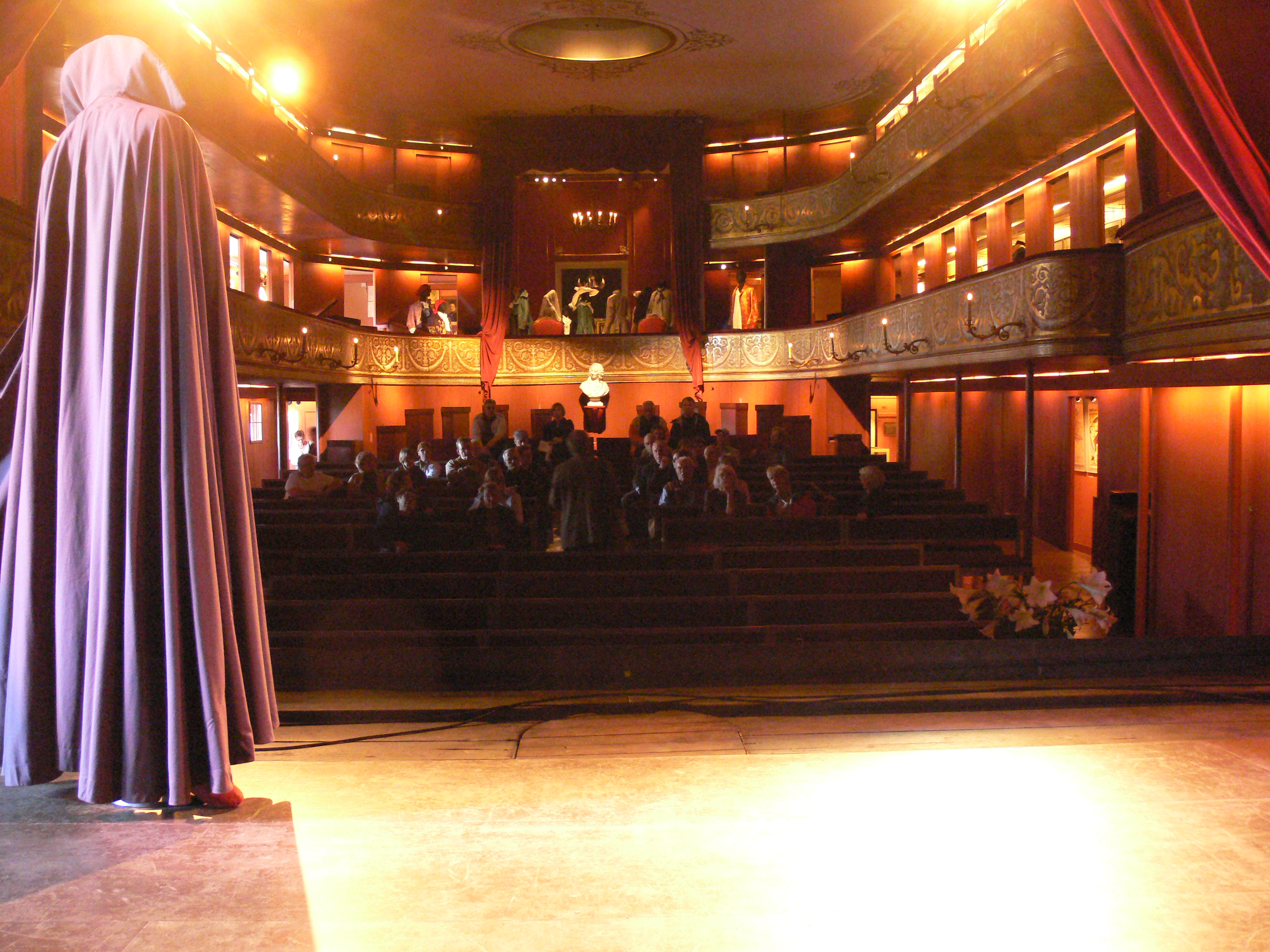
View of the auditorium from the stage

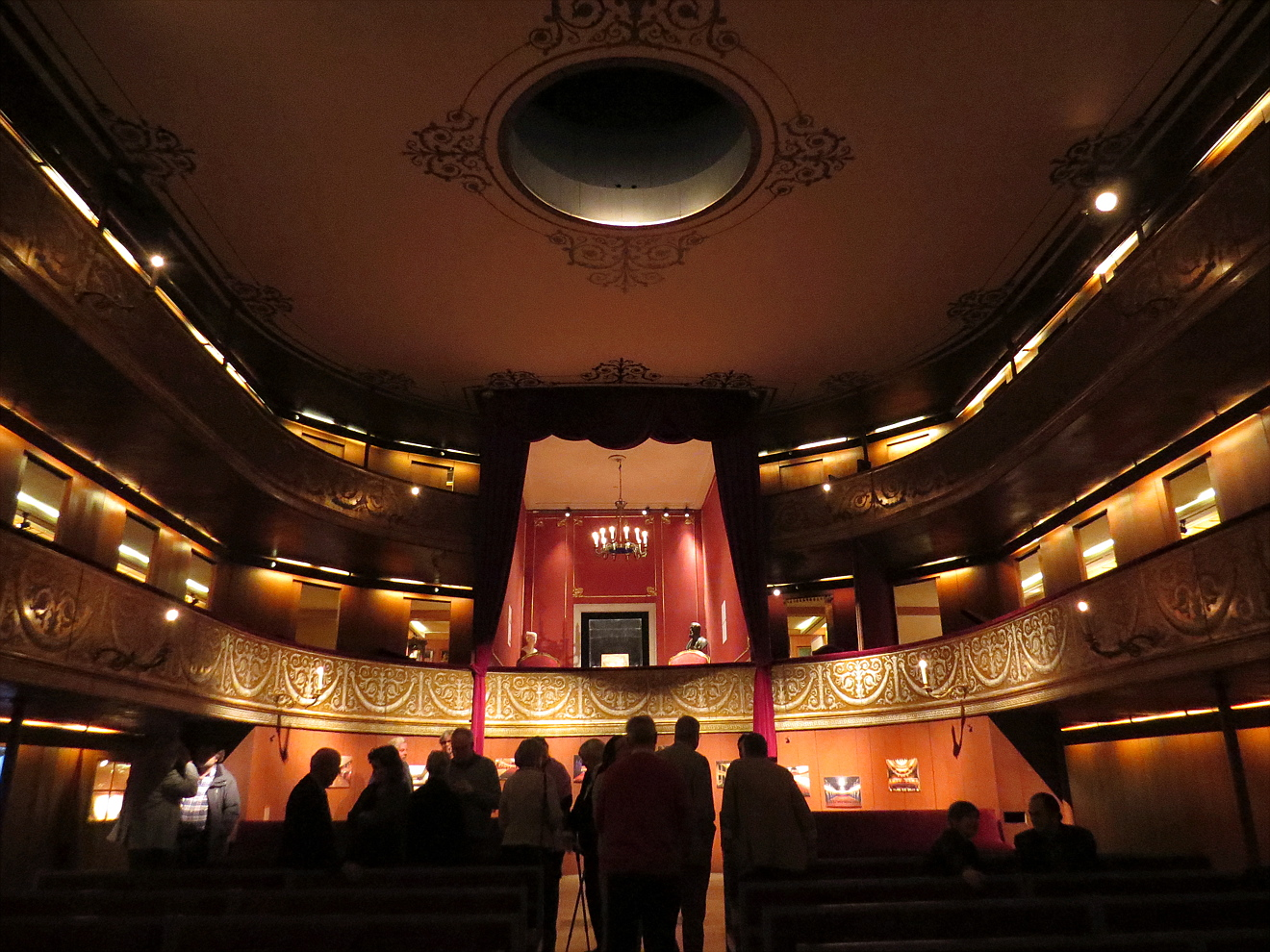
View of the boxes, including the royal box in the centre

The Theatre Museum in the Court Theatre (Danish: Teatermuseet i Hofteatret) is situated at Christiansborg Palace on Slotsholmen, Copenhagen, Denmark, above the Royal Stables, and is on the first floor of the building. Its collection describes Danish theatre history from the 18th century to the present.

== History ==
The museum was originally founded in 1912 by a private group of theatre enthusiasts. Under the leadership of Robert Neiiendam (1880–1966), the head of the Theatre Museum at the Court Theatre, it was moved in 1922 to the old Court Theatre.

The museum deals with Danish theatre history and seeks to document the history of professional theatre through the collection of pictures, letters, costumes, props and models of theatre buildings and set designs. The Court Theatre is actually part of the museum exhibition, since the public has free access to walk around the theatre building. The auditorium is also used for various events such as readings, lectures, concerts and small guest acting. Television programs such as Det Nye Talkshow – med Anders Lund Madsen are broadcast live from the Court Theatre.

== The Court Theatre ==
Copenhagen Castle had a theatre, inaugurated by the French court theatre troupe La troupe du Roi de Danemark in 1712, but when Christiansborg was to be built, the theatre was omitted by the strongly religious and pietistic builder, Christian VI. Later, Christian VII began to have performances in the dining hall and sometimes even participated as an actor himself. It developed into a real palace theatre in 1766. A room that had been built as a tack room above the stables in the eastern equestrian wing was now converted into a theatre hall. The room was designed by architect Nicolas-Henri Jardin and inaugurated in January 1767. No pictures or detailed descriptions are known. The room was intended to be used as both a theatre and a ballroom, and so the sloping boards of the theatre could be made straight.

In 1842 the theatre was rebuilt in the Biedermeier style, and the red box theatre can be seen today. It eventually became an annex to the Royal Theatre, and in 1881 it was closed due to new fire regulations, and most of the furnishings were sold. For a time the room served as a furniture warehouse. There were plans to convert it into a "speech stage" for DKK 600,000 but fire safety was a problem.
