= Asaka =

Asaka may refer to:

== Cities ==
- Asaka, Saitama, Japan
- Asaka, Uzbekistan

== People ==
- Asaka-no-miya (朝香) ōke (princely house), a branch of the Japanese Imperial Family
  - Prince Yasuhiko Asaka
- Asaka (musician) (born 1999), Japanese singer
- Akie Asaka (浅香 あき恵, born 1956), Japanese comedian
- Asaka Kubo (久保 亜沙香, born 1979), Japanese singer
- Asaka Mayumi (朝加 真由美, born 1955), Japanese actress
- Morio Asaka (浅香 守生, born 1967), Japanese storyboard artist and director
- Asaka Seto (瀬戸 朝香, born 1976), Japanese actress
- Takekazu Asaka (浅香 武和, born 1952), Japanese linguist
- Yui Asaka (浅香 唯, born 1969), Japanese actress and singer

== Other uses ==
- Fukushima Prefectural Asaka High School
- Asaka Station (disambiguation)
- Asaka, a character from the musical Once on This Island
- Asaka Narumi, a character from the anime Cardfight!! Vanguard
- Keiichiro Asaka (朝加 圭一郎), a character from the tokusatsu Kaitou Sentai Lupinranger VS Keisatsu Sentai Patranger

== See also ==
- Azaka (disambiguation)
