= 1804 =

1804 in various calendars
- Gregorian calendar: 1804; MDCCCIV
- French Republican calendar: 12–13; XII–XIII
- Ab urbe condita: 2557
- Armenian calendar: 1253; ԹՎ ՌՄԾԳ
- Assyrian calendar: 6554
- Balinese saka calendar: 1725–1726
- Bengali calendar: 1210–1211
- Berber calendar: 2754
- British Regnal year: 44 Geo. 3 – 45 Geo. 3
- Buddhist calendar: 2348
- Burmese calendar: 1166
- Byzantine calendar: 7312–7313
- Chinese calendar: 癸亥年 (Water Pig); 4501 or 4294 — to — 甲子年 (Wood Rat); 4502 or 4295
- Coptic calendar: 1520–1521
- Discordian calendar: 2970
- Ethiopian calendar: 1796–1797
- Hebrew calendar: 5564–5565
- Hindu calendars
- Vikram Samvat: 1860–1861
- Shaka Samvat: 1725–1726
- Kali Yuga: 4904–4905
- Holocene calendar: 11804
- Igbo calendar: 804–805
- Iranian calendar: 1182–1183
- Islamic calendar: 1218–1219
- Japanese calendar: Kyōwa 3 / Bunka 1 (文化元年)
- Javanese calendar: 1730–1731
- Julian calendar: Gregorian minus 12 days
- Korean calendar: 4137
- Minguo calendar: 108 before ROC 民前108年
- Nanakshahi calendar: 336
- Thai solar calendar: 2346–2347
- Tibetan calendar: ཆུ་མོ་ཕག་ལོ་ (female Water-Boar); 1930 or 1549 or 777 — to — ཤིང་ཕོ་བྱི་བ་ལོ་ (male Wood-Rat); 1931 or 1550 or 778

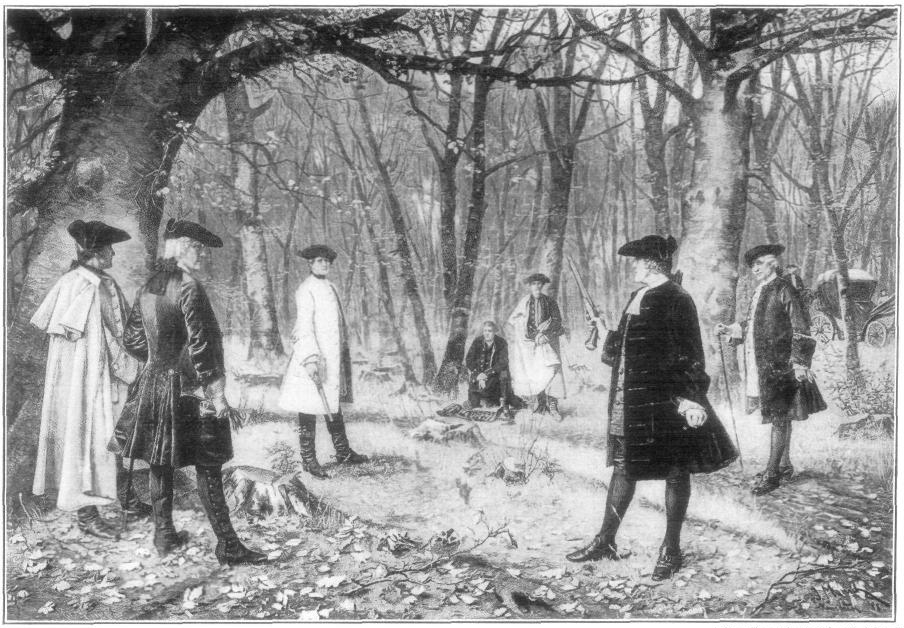
July 11: U.S. Vice President Aaron Burr kills former Treasury Secretary Hamilton. Illustration after painting "Ein Ehrenhandel" by Joseph Munsch (Austrian, 1832-1896)

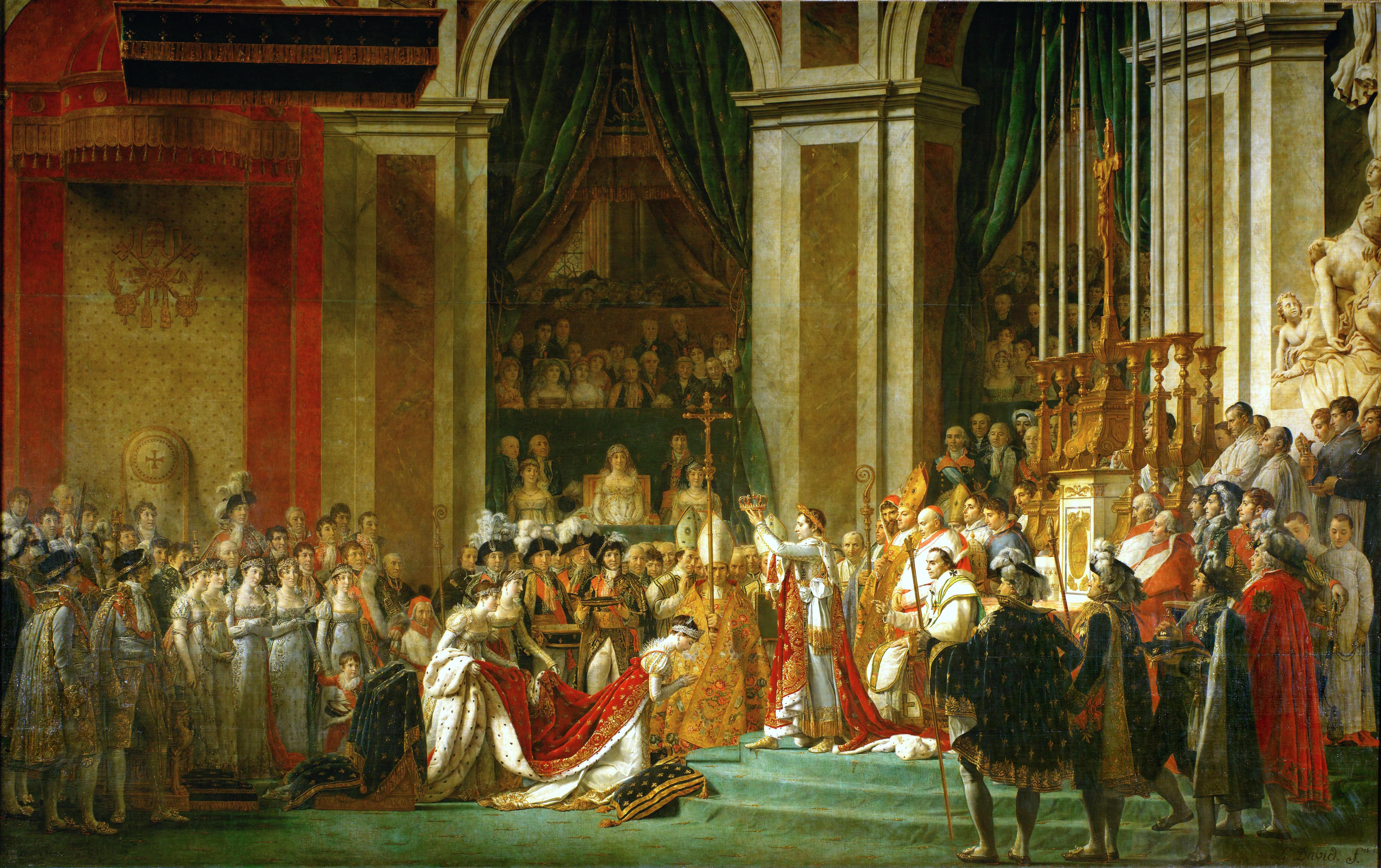
December 2: The Coronation of Napoleon as Emperor takes place

Said Bin Sultan takes office as sultan of Muscat and Oman

1804 (MDCCCIV) was a leap year starting on Sunday of the Gregorian calendar and a leap year starting on Friday of the Julian calendar, the 1804th year of the Common Era (CE) and Anno Domini (AD) designations, the 804th year of the 2nd millennium, the 4th year of the 19th century, and the 5th year of the 1800s decade. As of the start of 1804, the Gregorian calendar was 12 days ahead of the Julian calendar, which remained in localized use until 1923.

== Events ==
=== January–March ===
- January 1 – Haiti gains independence from France, becoming the first independent Black state in the New World.
- February 4 – The Sokoto Caliphate is founded in West Africa.
- February 14 – The First Serbian uprising begins the Serbian Revolution. By 1817, the Principality of Serbia will have proclaimed self-rule from the Ottoman Empire, the first nation-state in Europe to do so.
- February 15 – New Jersey becomes the last of the northern United States to abolish slavery.
- February 16 – First Barbary War: Stephen Decatur leads a raid to burn the pirate-held frigate USS Philadelphia at Tripoli to deny her further use by the captors.
- February 18 – Ohio University is chartered by the Ohio General Assembly.
- February 20 – Hobart is established in its permanent location in Van Diemen's Land (modern-day Tasmania) as a British penal colony.
- February 21 – Cornishman Richard Trevithick's newly built Penydarren steam locomotive operates on the Merthyr Tramroad, between Penydarren in Merthyr Tydfil and Abercynon in South Wales, following several trials since February 13, the world's first locomotive to work on rails.
- February 22–April 22 – 1804 Haiti massacre, an ethnic cleansing with the goal of eradicating the white population on Haiti.
- March 4–March 5 – The Castle Hill convict rebellion breaks out in New South Wales, led by Irish convicts in Australia.
- March 7 – In Britain:
  - John Wedgwood founds the Royal Horticultural Society.
  - Thomas Charles is instrumental in founding the British and Foreign Bible Society.
- March 10 – Louisiana Purchase, Three Flags Day: In St. Louis, a formal ceremony is conducted to transfer ownership of Louisiana Territory from France to the United States.
- March 17 – Friedrich Schiller's play Wilhelm Tell is first performed at Weimar, under the direction of Johann Wolfgang von Goethe.
- March 21 – The Napoleonic Code is adopted as French civil law.

=== April–June ===
- April 2 – Forty merchantmen are wrecked when a convoy led by British frigate HMS Apollo runs aground off Portugal with considerable loss of life.
- April 4 – Samuel Taylor Coleridge sets sail on The Speedwell for the Mediterranean. In Malta, he obtains employment as a public official.
- April 5 – The High Possil meteorite, the first recorded meteorite to fall in Scotland in modern times, falls at High Possil.
- April 26 – Henry Addington resigns as Prime Minister of the United Kingdom.
- May 10 – William Pitt the Younger begins his second term as Prime Minister of the United Kingdom.
- May 14 – The Lewis and Clark Expedition departs from Camp Dubois and begins its historic journey by traveling up the Missouri River.
- May 18 – Napoleon Bonaparte is proclaimed Emperor of the French by the French Senate.
- May 21 – Père Lachaise Cemetery a 118-acre (0.48 km^{2}) cemetery in Paris, France, is opened.
- June 9 – Beethoven's Symphony No. 3 in E–flat is premiered in Vienna.
- June 15 – The Twelfth Amendment to the United States Constitution is ratified by New Hampshire, and arguably becomes effective (subsequently vetoed by the Governor of New Hampshire).
- June 21 – Smithson Tennant announces the discovery of the elements iridium and osmium; three days later, William Hyde Wollaston reveals to the Royal Society that he is the formerly anonymous discoverer of palladium.

=== July–September ===
- July 11 – Aaron Burr, Vice President of the United States, shoots former U.S. Secretary of the Treasury Alexander Hamilton during a duel; Hamilton dies the next day.
- July 27 – The Twelfth Amendment to the U.S. Constitution, which reforms the way that candidates for President and Vice President are chosen, is ratified by Tennessee, removing doubt surrounding adoption.
- August 11 – In reaction to Napoleon being proclaimed emperor of France, Francis II assumes the title of a hereditary emperor of Austria (as Francis I) in addition to his title as emperor of the Holy Roman Empire. This latter title will become obsolete two years later when the formation of the Confederation of the Rhine instigated by Napoleon signals the end of the Holy Roman Empire.
- August 20 – Lewis and Clark Expedition: The Corps of Discovery, whose purpose is to explore the Louisiana Purchase, suffers its only death when Sergeant Charles Floyd dies, apparently from acute appendicitis.
- September 1 – German astronomer K. L. Harding discovers the asteroid Juno.

=== October–December ===
- October 5 – Action of 5 October 1804: War between Spain and the United Kingdom is triggered by the battle between four British warships (Indefatigable, Medusa, Amphion and Lively) and four Spanish frigates (Medee, Fama, Clara and Mercedes), all carrying treasure and merchandise. Captain Graham Moore of Indefatigable informs Spanish Admiral Jose Bustamante of his orders to detain the treasure-laden ships and, "not receiving a satisfactory answer, an Action commenced"; La Mercedes is sunk and the other three ships surrender.
- October 8 – Jean-Jacques Dessalines holds his coronation as Jean-Jacques I, Emperor of Haiti.
- November 3 – The Treaty of St. Louis is signed by Quashquame and William Henry Harrison; controversy surrounding the treaty eventually causes the Sauk people to ally with the British during the War of 1812, and is the main cause of the Black Hawk War of 1832.
- November 20 – Said bin Sultan, Sultan of Muscat and Oman, starts to rule.
- November 30 – The Democratic-Republican-controlled United States Senate begins an impeachment trial against Federalist-partisan Supreme Court of the United States Justice Samuel Chase, on charges of political bias (he is acquitted by the United States Senate of all charges on March 1, 1805).
- December 2 – Coronation of Napoleon I: At the cathedral of Notre Dame de Paris, Napoleon crowns himself as the first Emperor of the French in a thousand years. Witnessing this, Simón Bolívar dedicates himself to liberating Venezuela from Spanish rule.
- December 3 – Thomas Jefferson defeats Charles C. Pinckney in the United States presidential election.
- December 12 – Spain declares war on the United Kingdom.

=== Date unknown ===
- The Nguyễn dynasty emperor Gia Long changes his country's official name from Đại Việt to Việt Nam.
- Morphine is first isolated from the opium poppy by the German pharmacist, Friedrich Sertürner.
- Matthew Flinders recommends that New Holland be renamed Australia (from the Latin australis meaning "of the south").
- Shimizu-gumi, predecessor of Shimizu Corporation, a major construction company in Japan, is founded in Kanda region, Edo (modern-day Tokyo).
- World population reaches 1 billion people.

== Births ==
=== January–June ===
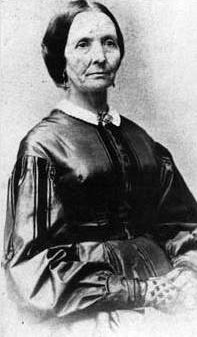
Eliza R. Snow

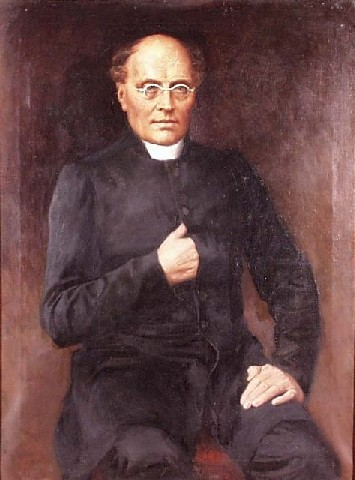
J. L. Runeberg

- January 1 – James Fannin, Texas revolutionary (d. 1836)
- January 9
  - Louis d'Aurelle de Paladines, French general (d. 1877)
  - Sydney Dacres, British admiral (d. 1884)
- January 10 – Élie Frédéric Forey, French general, Marshal of France (d. 1872)
- January 20 – Eugène Sue, French novelist (d. 1857)
- January 21 – Eliza Roxcy Snow, American poet (d. 1887)
- February 5 – J. L. Runeberg, Finnish national poet (d. 1877)
- February 7 – John Deere, American industrialist (d. 1886)
- February 13 – Claude-Étienne Minié, French army officer and weapon inventor (d. 1879)
- February 29 – Carl von Rokitansky, Czech medical doctor and pathologist (d. 1878)
- March 8 – Alvan Clark, American telescope manufacturer (d. 1887)
- March 14 – Johann Strauss Senior, Austrian composer (d. 1849)
- March 17 – Jim Bridger, American trapper and explorer (d. 1881)
- March 20 – Neal Dow, mayor of Portland, Maine and Father of Prohibition (d. 1897)
- April 3 – Lucien Baudens, French military surgeon (d. 1857)
- April 4 – Andrew Nicholl, Northern Irish painter (d. 1886)
- April 18 – Robert Davidson, Scottish locomotive pioneer (d. 1894)
- April 24 – Chō Kōran, Japanese poet, painter (d. 1879)
- April 26 – Charles Goodyear, American politician (d. 1876)
- May 4 – Margaretta Riley, British botanic (d. 1899)
- May 13 – Per Gustaf Svinhufvud af Qvalstad, treasurer of Tavastia province, manor host, and paternal grandfather of President of Finland P. E. Svinhufvud (d. 1866)
- May 16 – Elizabeth Peabody, Transcendental activist, educator (d. 1894)
- June 1
  - Mikhail Glinka, Russian composer (d. 1857)
  - George Sand, French writer (d. 1876)
- June 24 – Willard Richards, American religious leader (d. 1854)

=== July–December ===
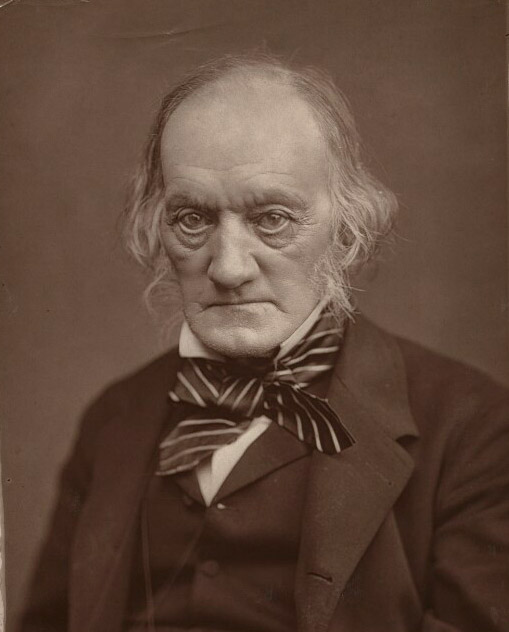
Richard Owen

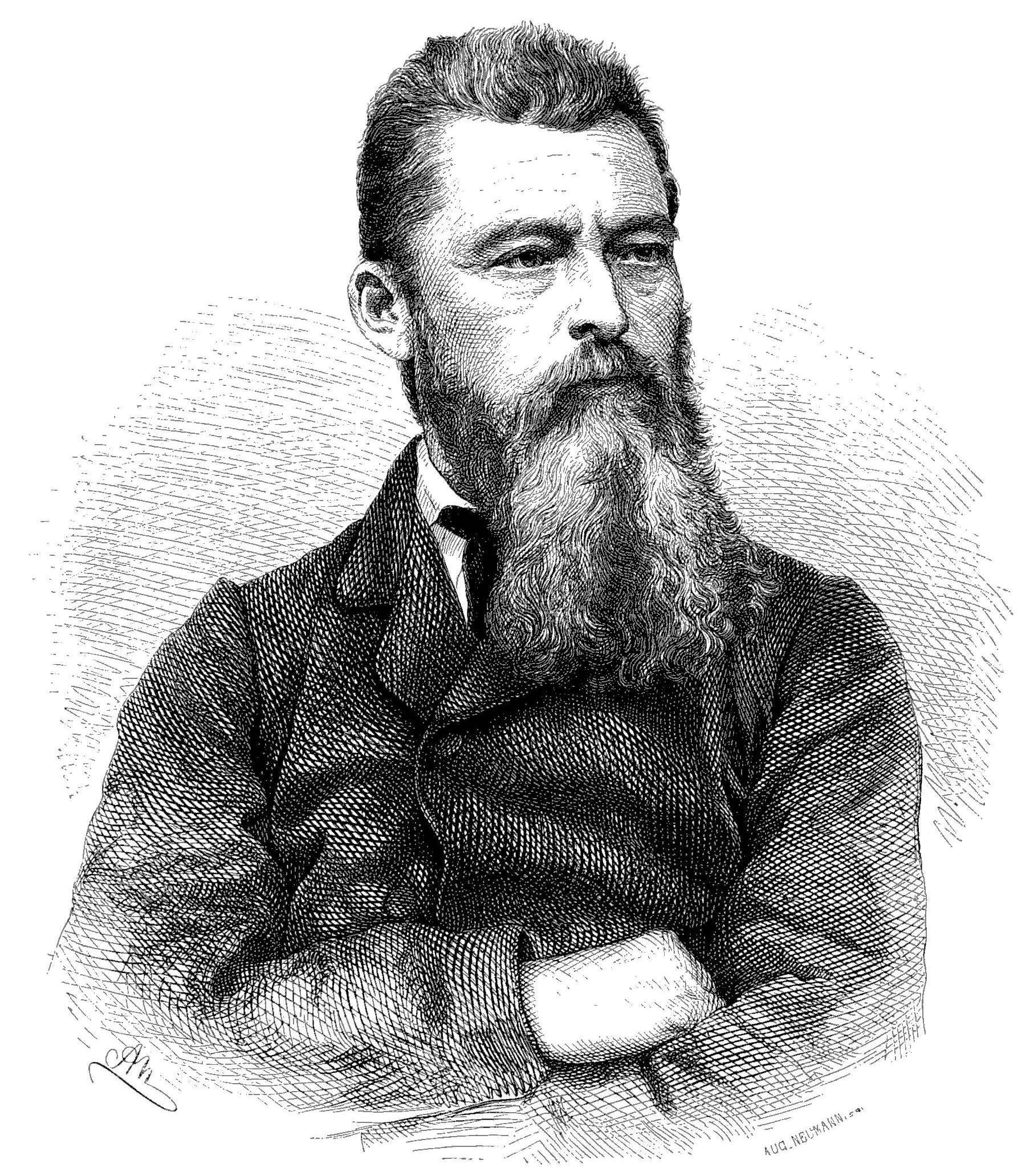
Ludwig Feuerbach

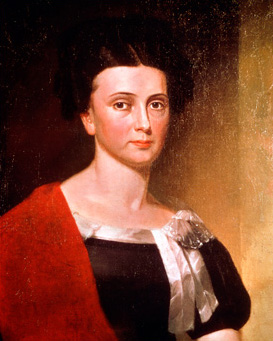
Jane Irwin Harrison

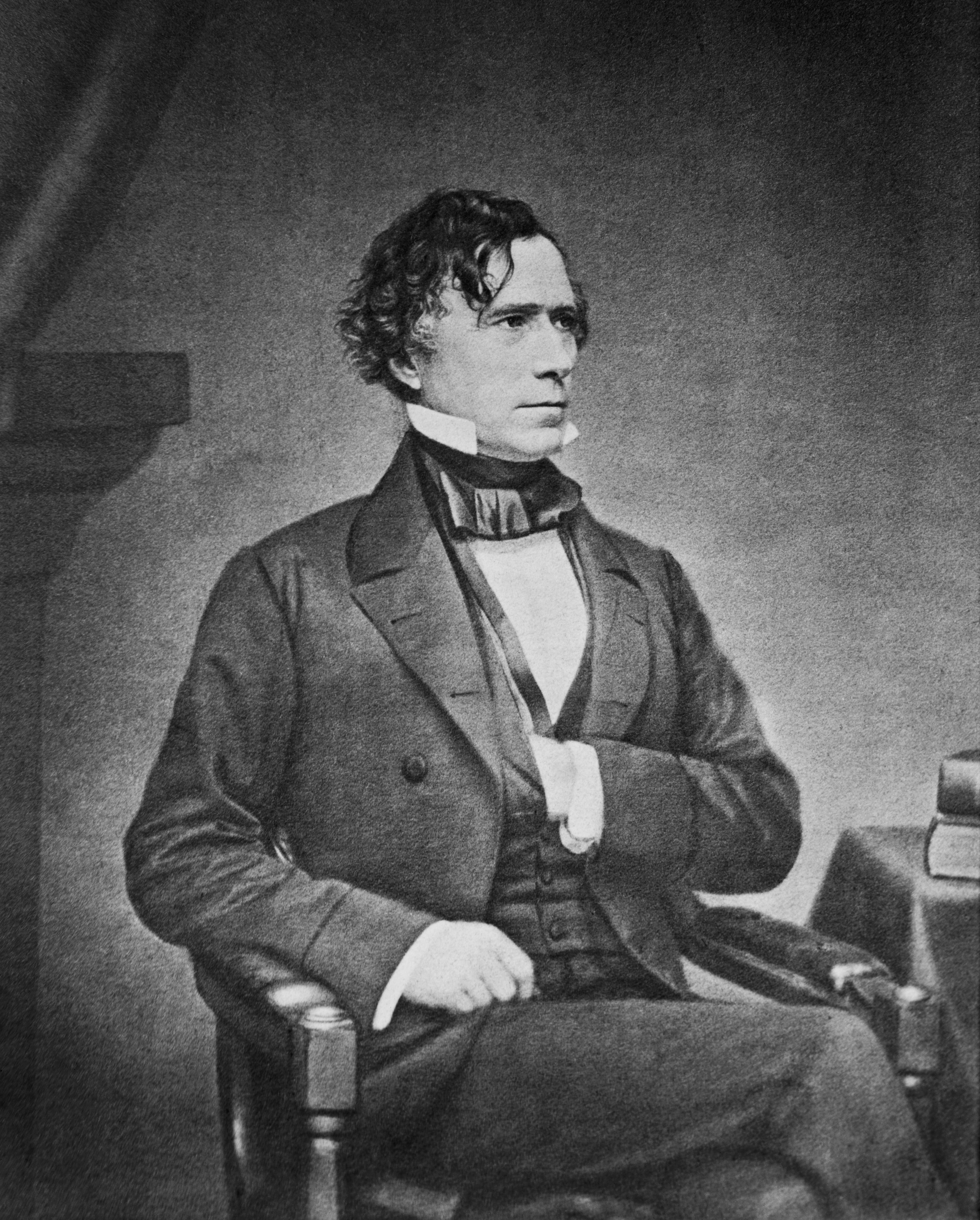
Franklin Pierce

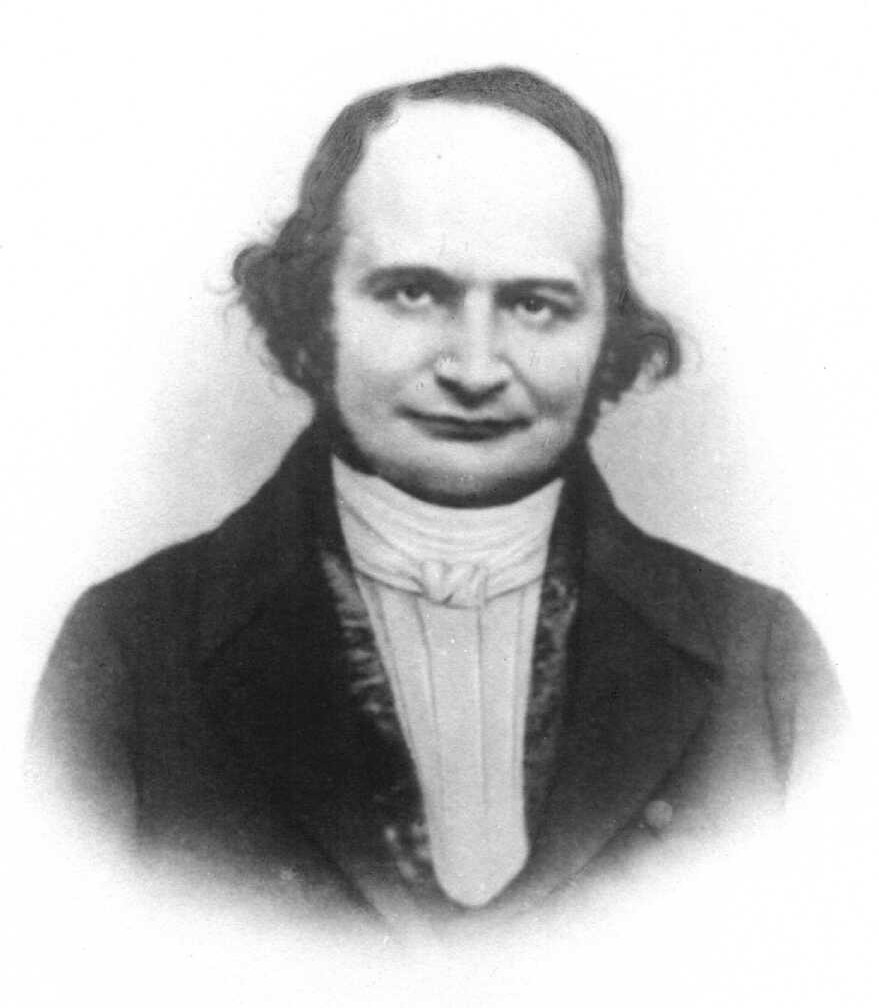
Carl Gustav Jacob Jacobi

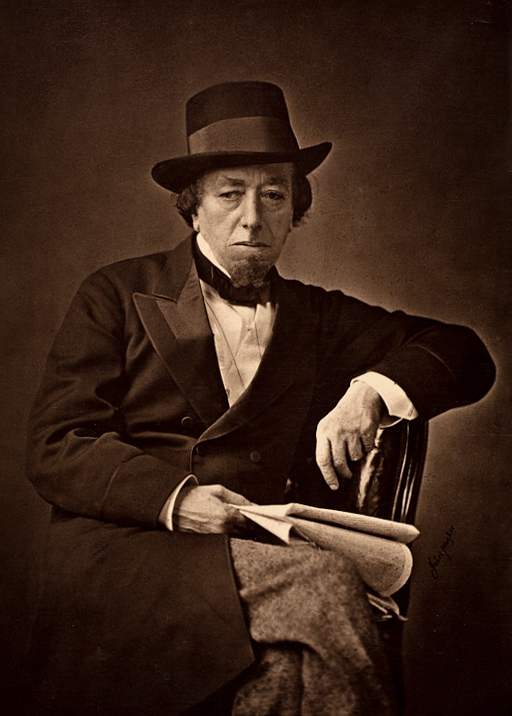
Benjamin Disraeli

- July 1 – George Sand, French novelist (d. 1876)
- July 4 – Nathaniel Hawthorne, American writer (d. 1864)
- July 6 – Jerónimo Carrión, 8th President of Ecuador (d. 1873)
- July 14 – Ludwig von Benedek, Austrian general (d. 1881)
- July 20 – Richard Owen, English anatomist, paleontologist, and zoologist (d. 1892)
- July 23 – Jane Irwin Harrison, de facto First Lady of the United States (d. 1846)
- July 28 – Ludwig Feuerbach, German philosopher (d. 1872)
- September 5 – William Alexander Graham, United States Senator from North Carolina (1840–1843), Confederate States Senator (1864–1865) (d. 1875)
- September 8 – Eduard Mörike, German poet (d. 1875)
- September 11 – Mercedes Marín del Solar, international Chilean poet and reform educator (d. 1866)
- September 14
  - Louis Désiré Maigret, Roman Catholic bishop of Honolulu (d. 1882)
  - John Gould, English ornithologist (d. 1881)
- September 28 – Alpheus Felch, American governor and senator from Michigan (d. 1896)
- October 18 – Mongkut, Rama IV, King of Siam (d. 1868)
- October 24 – Wilhelm Eduard Weber, German physicist (d. 1891)
- November 18 – Alfonso Ferrero La Marmora, Italian general and statesman (d. 1878)
- November 23 – Franklin Pierce, 14th President of the United States (d. 1869)
- December 7 – Noah Haynes Swayne, Associate Justice of the Supreme Court of the United States (d. 1884)
- December 10 – Carl Gustav Jacob Jacobi, German mathematician (d. 1851)
- December 13 – Joseph Howe, Canadian politician (d. 1873)
- December 16 – Viktor Bunyakovsky, Ukrainian-Russian mathematician (d. 1889)
- December 21 – Benjamin Disraeli, Prime Minister of the United Kingdom (1868; 1874–1880) (d. 1881)
- December 23 – Charles Augustin Sainte-Beuve, French literary critic (d. 1869)

=== Date unknown ===
- Isaac Aaron, English-born medical doctor, owner of the Australian Medical Journal and secretary of the Australian Medical Association (d. 1877)
- James Fannin, colonel in Army of the Republic of Texas and slave trader (executed 1836)
- Hortense Globensky-Prévost, Canadian heroine (d. 1873)
- Anne Hill, British-Canadian dancer and actor (d. 1896)
- Chō Kōran, Japanese poet and painter (d. 1879)
- Eugénie Luce, French educator (d. 1882)
- James Mackay, Scottish-born New Zealand politician (d. 1875)

== Deaths ==
=== January–June ===
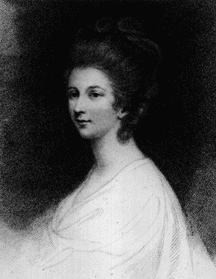
Charlotte Lennox

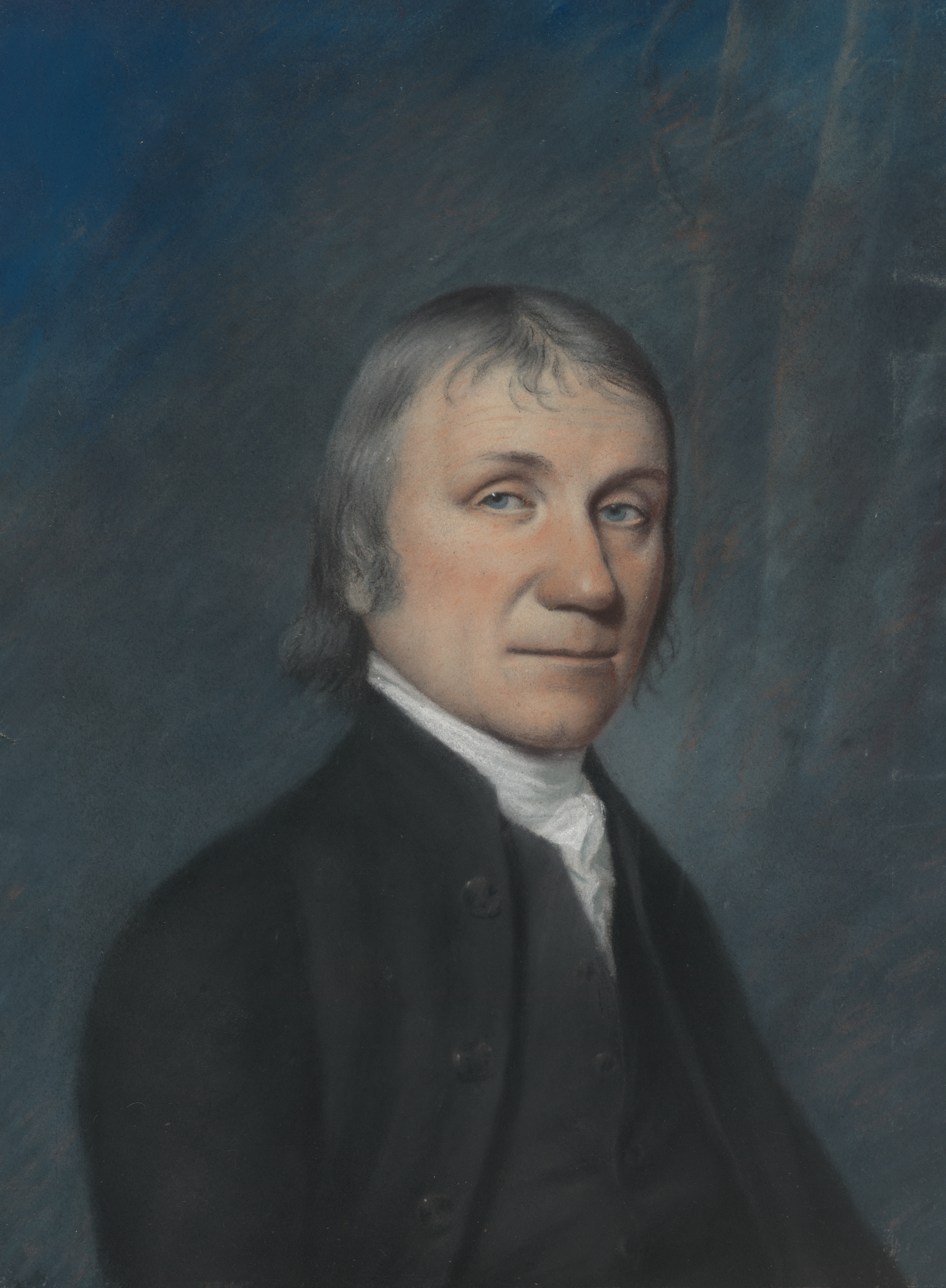
Joseph Priestley

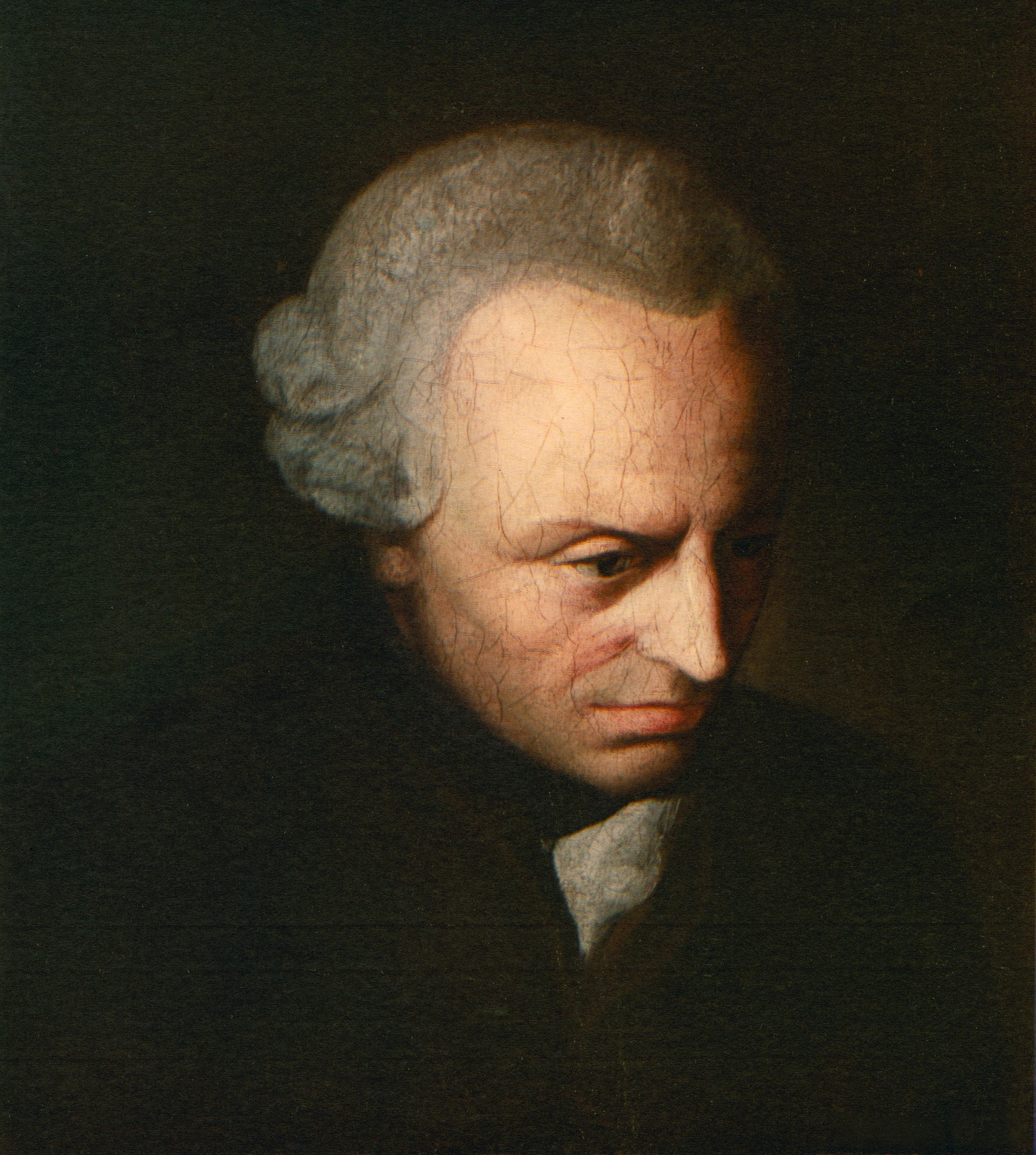
Immanuel Kant

- January 4 – Charlotte Ramsey Lennox, British author and poet (b. 1727)
- January 15 – Dru Drury, English entomologist (b. 1725)
- February 3 – Sir Edward Blackett, 4th Baronet, English politician (b. 1719)
- February 6 – Joseph Priestley, British chemist (b. 1733)
- February 7 – William Bingham, American Continental congressman, senator for Pennsylvania (b. 1752)
- February 12 – Immanuel Kant, German philosopher (b. 1724)
- March 3 – Giovanni Domenico Tiepolo, painter (b. 1727)
- March 13 – Damodar Pande, Prime Minister of Nepal (b. 1752)
- March 16 – Henrik Gabriel Porthan Finnish writer and historian (b. 1739)
- March 21 – Louis Antoine, Duke of Enghien (executed) (b. 1772)
- March 30 – Victor-François, 2nd duc de Broglie, Marshal of France (b. 1718)
- April 9 – Jacques Necker, French statesman (b. 1732)
- April 11 – Miklós Küzmics, Hungarian Slovenes writer, Catholic priest (b. 1737)
- April 15 – Jean-Charles Pichegru, French general (strangled in prison) (b. 1761)
- May 25 – Johann Joachim Spalding, German theologian (b. 1714)

=== July–December ===
- July 12 – Alexander Hamilton, American statesman and Founding Father (killed in a duel) (b. 1755 or 1757)
- September 4 – Richard Somers, American naval officer (killed in battle) (b. 1778)
- September 20 – Pierre Méchain, French astronomer (b. 1744)
- October 2 – Nicolas-Joseph Cugnot, French steam vehicle pioneer (b. 1725)
- October 8 – Thomas Cochran (judge), Canadian judge (b. 1777)
- October 29 – Sarah Crosby, the first female Methodist preacher (b. 1729)
- November 1 – Johann Friedrich Gmelin, German naturalist (b. 1748)
- November 5 – Maria Anna Adamberger, Austrian actress (b. 1752)
- November 18 – Philip Schuyler, general in the American Revolution, a United States senator from New York, father of Angelica Schuyler Church and Elizabeth Schuyler Hamilton, father-in-law of Alexander Hamilton (b. 1733)
- November 23 – Richard Graves, English writer (b. 1715)
- December 18 – Jacob ben Wolf Kranz, Lithuanian maggid (b. c. 1740)
- December 25 – Contarina Barbarigo, famous Venetian noble.
