= 1873 =

1873 in various calendars
- Gregorian calendar: 1873; MDCCCLXXIII
- Ab urbe condita: 2626
- Armenian calendar: 1322; ԹՎ ՌՅԻԲ
- Assyrian calendar: 6623
- Baháʼí calendar: 29–30
- Balinese saka calendar: 1794–1795
- Bengali calendar: 1279–1280
- Berber calendar: 2823
- British Regnal year: 36 Vict. 1 – 37 Vict. 1
- Buddhist calendar: 2417
- Burmese calendar: 1235
- Byzantine calendar: 7381–7382
- Chinese calendar: 壬申年 (Water Monkey); 4570 or 4363 — to — 癸酉年 (Water Rooster); 4571 or 4364
- Coptic calendar: 1589–1590
- Discordian calendar: 3039
- Ethiopian calendar: 1865–1866
- Hebrew calendar: 5633–5634
- Hindu calendars
- Vikram Samvat: 1929–1930
- Shaka Samvat: 1794–1795
- Kali Yuga: 4973–4974
- Holocene calendar: 11873
- Igbo calendar: 873–874
- Iranian calendar: 1251–1252
- Islamic calendar: 1289–1290
- Japanese calendar: Meiji 6 (明治６年)
- Javanese calendar: 1801–1802
- Julian calendar: Gregorian minus 12 days
- Korean calendar: 4206
- Minguo calendar: 39 before ROC 民前39年
- Nanakshahi calendar: 405
- Thai solar calendar: 2415–2416
- Tibetan calendar: ཆུ་ཕོ་སྤྲེ་ལོ་ (male Water-Monkey); 1999 or 1618 or 846 — to — ཆུ་མོ་བྱ་ལོ་ (female Water-Bird); 2000 or 1619 or 847

1873 (MDCCCLXXIII) was a common year starting on Wednesday of the Gregorian calendar and a common year starting on Monday of the Julian calendar, the 1873rd year of the Common Era (CE) and Anno Domini (AD) designations, the 873rd year of the 2nd millennium, the 73rd year of the 19th century, and the 4th year of the 1870s decade. As of the start of 1873, the Gregorian calendar was 12 days ahead of the Julian calendar, which remained in localized use until 1923.

== Events ==
=== January ===
- January 1
  - Japan adopts the Gregorian calendar.
  - The California Penal Code goes into effect.
- January 17 – American Indian Wars: Modoc War: First Battle of the Stronghold – Modoc Indians defeat the United States Army.

=== February ===
- February 11 – The Spanish Cortes deposes King Amadeus I, and proclaims the First Spanish Republic.
- February 12
  - Emilio Castelar, the former foreign minister, becomes prime minister of the new Spanish Republic.
  - The Coinage Act of 1873 in the United States is signed into law by President Ulysses S. Grant. Coming into effect on April 1, it ends bimetallism in the U.S., and places the country on the gold standard.
- February 20
  - The University of California opens its first medical school in San Francisco.
  - British naval officer John Moresby discovers the site of Port Moresby in Papua New Guinea, and claims the land for Britain.

=== March ===
- March 3 – Censorship: The United States Congress enacts the Comstock Law, making it illegal to send any "obscene, lewd, or lascivious" books through the mail.
- March 15 – The Phi Sigma Kappa student fraternity is founded at the Massachusetts Agricultural College.
- March 22 – Emancipation Day for Puerto Rico: Most slaves are freed.
- March 29 – The Rio Tinto Company is formed in Spain, following the February 17 purchase of the Rio Tinto Mine from the Spanish government by a British investment group.

=== April ===
- April 1 – The British ocean liner RMS Atlantic sinks off Nova Scotia, killing 547 people.
- April 4 – The Kennel Club, the world's first kennel club, is founded in the United Kingdom.
- April 13 – Colfax massacre: More than 60 to 150 black men are murdered in Colfax, Louisiana, while surrendering to a mob of former Confederate soldiers and members of the Ku Klux Klan.
- April 15–17 – American Indian Wars: The Second Battle of the Stronghold is fought.
- April 19 – In Richmond, Rhode Island, 11 people perish in a train derailment, due to a bridge washout in the village of Richmond Switch (modern-day Wood River Junction).
- April 23 – Third Carlist War: Brigadier General Carmona confronts the insurgents at the Madrid bullring.

=== May ===
- May 1 – The Vienna World's Fair opens in the capital of Austria-Hungary and runs for six months, closing on October 31.
- May 5 – Third Carlist War in Spain: Battle of Eraul – Carlists under General Dorregaray defeat Republicans at Eraul, near Estella.
- May 9
  - Der Gründerkrach: The Wiener Börse (Vienna stock exchange) crash in Austria-Hungary ends the Gründerzeit, and heralds the global Panic of 1873 and Long Depression.
  - Third Carlist War: The Battle of Montejurra is fought at Navarra, Spain.
- May 20
  - Levi Strauss and Jacob Davis receive United States patent 139121, for using copper rivets to strengthen the pockets of denim work pants. Levi Strauss & Co. begins manufacturing the famous Levi's brand of jeans, using fabric from the Amoskeag Manufacturing Company in Manchester, New Hampshire.
  - In Chipping Norton, England, rioters attempt to free the Ascott Martyrs –16 women sentenced to imprisonment, for attempting to dissuade strikebreakers in an agricultural labor dispute.
- May 23
  - The Canadian Parliament establishes the North-West Mounted Police (which is renamed the Royal Canadian Mounted Police in 1920).
  - The Preakness Stakes horse race is run for the first time in Baltimore.
- May 27 – Classical archaeologist Heinrich Schliemann discovers Priam's Treasure.
- May 28
  - C. Laan brings order to the chaos created by the dockworker riots of Tripoli, Lebanon.
  - The city of Khiva in Turkestan falls to Imperial Russian forces, under the command of General Konstantin von Kaufman.
- May – Henry Rose exhibits barbed wire at an Illinois county fair, which is taken up by Joseph Glidden and Jacob Haish, who invent a machine to mass-produce it.

=== June ===
- June 4 – American Indian Wars: The Modoc War ends with the capture of Kintpuash (Captain Jack).
- June 9 – Alexandra Palace entertainment venue in London is destroyed by fire, only a fortnight after its opening.

=== July ===
- July 1 – Prince Edward Island joins the Canadian Confederation.
- July 5 – New Rush in Griqualand West, South Africa, is renamed Kimberley.
- July 9 –
  - Third Carlist War: Battle of Alpens – Campaigning in Catalonia, a government column under General José Cabrinetty is ambushed at Alpens, 15 miles east of Berga, by Carlist forces under General Francisco Savalls. After heavy fighting, with Cabrinety killed, virtually the entire column of 800 men is killed or captured.
  - The government of Otto von Bismarck in a united Germany introduces the gold mark, a unified currency to replace the various legal tender of the nation-states of the German Confederation..
- July 17 – Richard Southey becomes the first Lieutenant-Governor of Griqualand West.
- July 21 – At Adair, Iowa, Jesse James and the James–Younger Gang pull off the first successful train robbery in the American Old West (US$3,000 from the Rock Island Express).
- July 22 – Sir Benjamin Pine becomes Lieutenant-governor of the Colony of Natal.
- July – The end of the war between the United Kingdom and Ghana's King Kofi KariKari, who is involved in the trading of slaves, leads to the establishment of the Gold Coast Colony.

=== August ===
- August 4 – American Indian Wars: While protecting a railroad survey party in Montana, the Seventh Cavalry, under Lieutenant Colonel George Armstrong Custer, clashes for the first time with the Sioux, near the Tongue River (only 1 man on each side is killed).
- August 12 – A peace treaty is signed between Imperial Russia and the Khanate of Khiva, making the khanate a Russian protectorate.
- August 30 – The Austro-Hungarian North Pole Expedition discovers Franz Josef Land.

=== September ===
- September 15 – The International Meteorological Organization (IMO) is established.
- September 16 – German troops leave France upon completion of payment of indemnity for the Franco-Prussian War.
- September 17 – The Ohio Agricultural and Mechanical College, later Ohio State University, opens its doors with 25 students, including 2 women.
- September 18 – The New York stock market crashes as the Jay Cooke & Company investment firm declares bankruptcy, triggering the Panic of 1873, part of the Long Depression.
- September 25 – Classes begin at Drury University in Springfield, Missouri.

=== October ===
- October 2 – The British ship SS Ismailia, an Anchor Line steamer that departed from New York on September 30 with 52 people disappears while en route to Glasgow.
- October 29 – At Dresden, Albrecht I becomes new King Albrecht I of King of Saxony, an independent state within the German Empire, upon the death of his father King Johann, who had ruled since 1854.

=== November ===
- November 7
  - Alexander Mackenzie becomes the second Prime Minister of Canada.
  - Third Carlist War: Battle of Montejurra – Determined to recapture the key city of Estella in Navarre, Spanish Republican General Domingo Moriones advances on the Carlists under General Joaquín Elío at nearby Montejurra. After very heavy fighting both sides claim victory, but Moriones withdraws, and Estella remains in Carlist hands. Don Carlos is present in the front line.
- November 17 – Budapest, Hungary's capital, is formed from Pest, Buda and Óbuda.
- November 18–21 – Irish Home Rule movement: The Home Government Association reconstitutes itself as the Home Rule League.
- November 22 – SS Ville du Havre, on passage from New York to France, collides with Scottish 3-masted iron clipper Loch Earn in mid-Atlantic and sinks in 12 minutes with the loss of 226 lives.

=== December ===
- December 15 – Women of Fredonia, New York, march against the retail liquor dealers in town, to inaugurate the Woman's Crusade of 1873–74.
- December 16 – The Heineken Brewery is founded in Amsterdam, the Netherlands.
- December 19 (December 7 OS) – Pyotr Ilyich Tchaikovsky's fantasia The Tempest, composed between August and October, is premiered, in Moscow.
- December 21 – French official Francis Garnier is attacked outside Hanoi by Black Flag mercenaries fighting for the Vietnamese.
- December 22 – Third Carlist War: Battle of Bocairente – Campaigning in Valenica, Spanish Republican General Valeriano Weyler is attacked at Bocairente, northwest of Alcoy, by a greatly superior Carlist force under General José Santés. Weyler is initially driven back, losing some of his guns, but in a brilliant counter-attack he turns defeat into victory, and Santés is heavily repulsed and forced to withdraw.
- December 23 – The Woman's Christian Temperance Union is founded, in Hillsboro, Ohio.
- December 27 – Third Carlist War: Siege of Bilbao (until 2 May 1874) – Campaigning in Navarre, Pretender Don Carlos VII and General Joaquín Elío besiege Bilbao, held by General Ignacio del Castillo and 1,200 men. The Carlist force is ten times this number, and includes most of the troops from Navarre, Vizcaya and Álava, although a considerable force is left in Guipúzcoa. Despite defeat at nearby Somorrostro, Republican commander Marshal Francisco Serrano, supported by Generals Manuel de la Concha and Arsenio Martínez-Campos, brilliantly breaks the siege, and Concha then marches on Estella.
- December – Major Walter Clopton Wingfield designs and patents a racquet sport, which he calls sphairistike (Greek σφάίρίστική, "skill at playing at ball"), soon known simply as Stické and an ancestor of lawn tennis, for the amusement of his guests at a garden party on his estate of Nantclwyd, in Llanelidan, Wales.

=== Date unknown ===
- The League of the Three Emperors is created. It links the conservative monarchs of Austria-Hungary, the German Empire and the Russian Empire in an alliance against radical movements.
- Founding in Canada of:
  - Toronto Argonauts (football), the oldest professional sports team still playing in North America.
  - Royal Montreal Club in Montreal, the first permanent golf club in North America.
- Liebig's Extract of Meat Company begins producing tinned corned beef, sold under the label Fray Bentos, from the town in Uruguay where it is processed.
- Coors Brewing Company begins making beer in Golden, Colorado.
- Konishiya Rokubei, predecessor of the Konica Minolta worldwide imaging brand, is founded in Tokyo, Japan.
- The Swedish arms company Aktiebolaget (AB) Bofors-Gullspång, better known as Bofors, is founded.
- In Mexico, the Veracruz–Mexico City railroad is completed.
- Nine Pekin ducks are imported to Long Island (the first in the United States).
- The Married Woman's Property Rights Association is founded in Sweden.
- Demonstration of an electric tram operated on Miller's line at Sestroretsk near Saint Petersburg in the Russian Empire by inventor Fyodor Pirotsky.

== Births ==
=== January–February ===
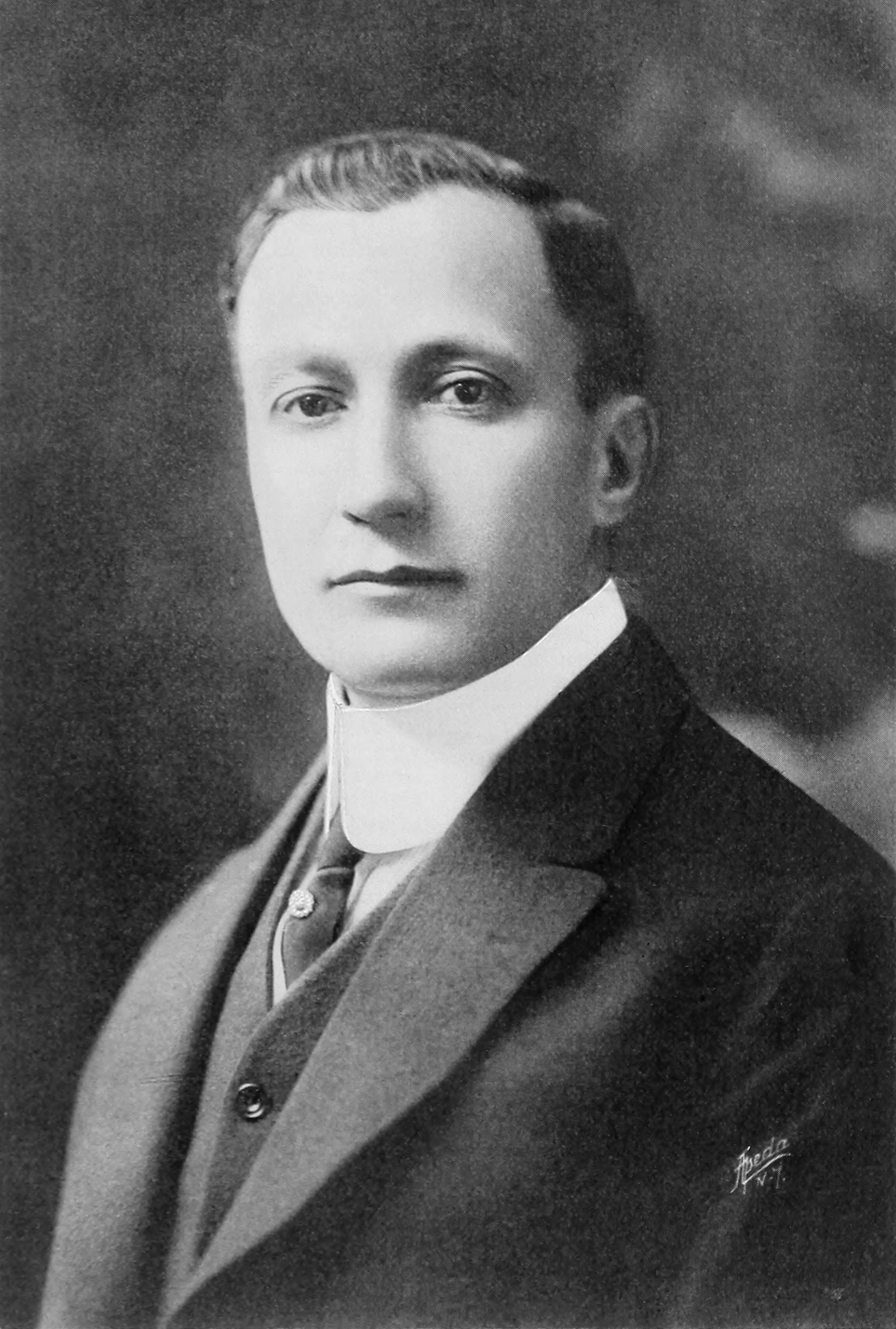
Adolph Zukor

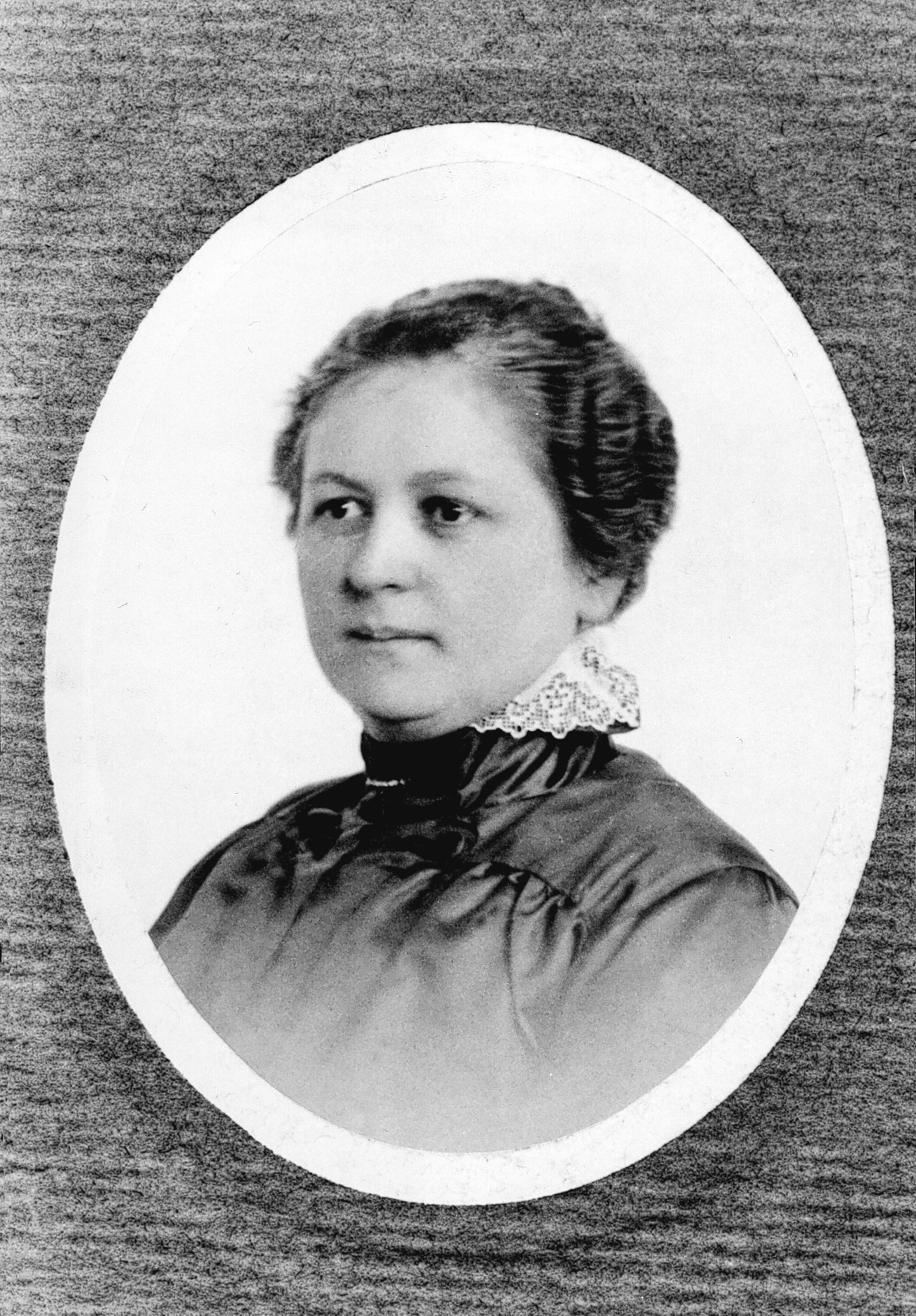
Melitta Bentz

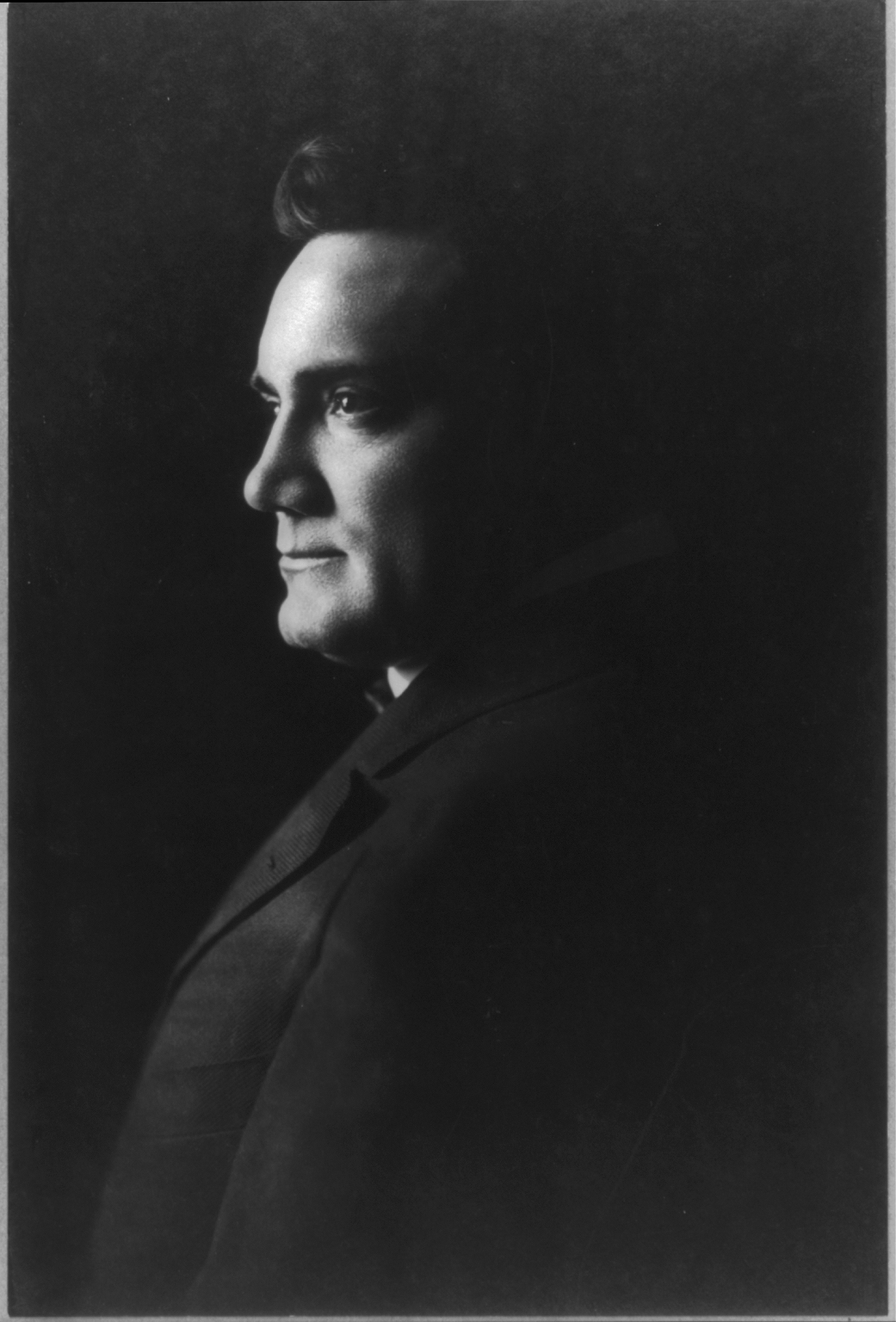
Enrico Caruso

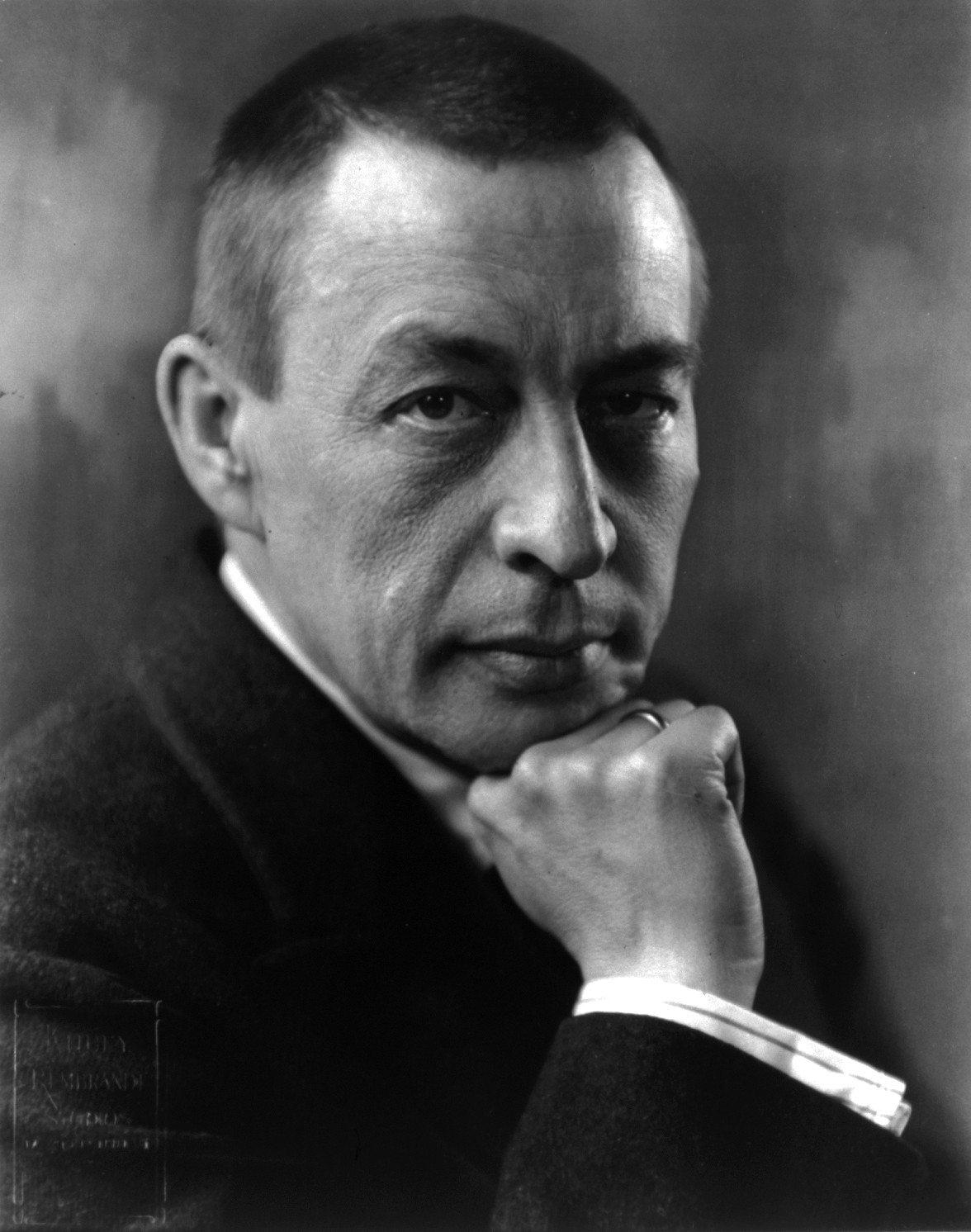
Sergei Rachmaninoff

- January 2 – Thérèse of Lisieux, Catholic saint, mystic (d. 1897)
- January 4 – Blanche Walsh, American stage, screen actress (d. 1915)
- January 7 – Adolph Zukor, Austrian-born film studio pioneer (d. 1976)
- January 8 – Iuliu Maniu, Romanian politician (d. 1953)
- January 9
  - Thomas Curtis, American athlete (d. 1944)
  - Hayim Nahman Bialik, Israel's national poet (d. 1934)
- January 10 – George Orton, Canadian athlete (d. 1958)
- January 12 – Spyridon Louis, Greek runner (d. 1940)
- January 20 – Johannes V. Jensen, Danish writer, Nobel Prize laureate (d. 1950)
- January 28 – Colette, French writer (d. 1954)
- January 29 – Prince Luigi Amedeo, Duke of the Abruzzi, Italian mountaineer, explorer and admiral (d. 1933)
- January 30 – Vassily Balabanov, administrator, Provincial Governor of Imperial Russia (d. 1947)
- January 31 – Melitta Bentz, German entrepreneur who invented the coffee filter in 1908 (d. 1950)
- February 2 – Maurice Tourneur, French film director (d. 1961)
- February 3
  - Hugh Trenchard, British military aviation pioneer (d. 1956)
  - Karl Jatho, German aviation pioneer (d. 1933)
- February 4 – Étienne Desmarteau, Canadian athlete (d. 1905)
- February 7 – Thomas Andrews, Irish shipbuilder (d. 1912)
- February 13
  - Feodor Chaliapin, Russian bass opera singer (d. 1938)
  - Red Wing, Native American silent film actress (d. 1974)
- February 15 – Hans von Euler-Chelpin, German-born chemist, Nobel Prize laureate (d. 1964)
- February 19 – Louis Feuillade, French film director (d. 1925)
- February 25 – Enrico Caruso, Italian tenor (d. 1921)
- February 28 – William McMaster Murdoch, Officer of Titanic (d. 1912)

=== March–April ===
- March 3 – William Green, American labor leader (d. 1952)
- March 11 – David Horsley, English-born film executive (d. 1933)
- March 19 – Max Reger, German composer (d. 1916)
- March 29 – Billy Quirk, American actor (d. 1926)
- April 1 (N.S.)/March 20 (O.S.) – Sergei Rachmaninoff, Russian pianist and composer (d. 1943)
- April 4 – Gyula Peidl, 23rd prime minister of Hungary (d. 1943)
- April 7 – John McGraw, American baseball player, manager (d. 1934)
- April 10 – Kyösti Kallio, Prime Minister and President of Finland (d. 1940)
- April 13 – John W. Davis, American politician, diplomat, and lawyer (d. 1955)
- April 19 – Sydney Barnes, English cricketer (d. 1967)
- April 20 – Gombojab Tsybikov, Russian explorer (d. 1930)
- April 22 – Ellen Glasgow, American writer (d. 1945)
- April 23 – Theodor Körner, President of Austria (d. 1957)
- April 25
  - Walter de la Mare, English poet, short story writer and novelist (d. 1956)
  - Félix d'Herelle, French-Canadian microbiologist (d. 1949)

=== May–June ===
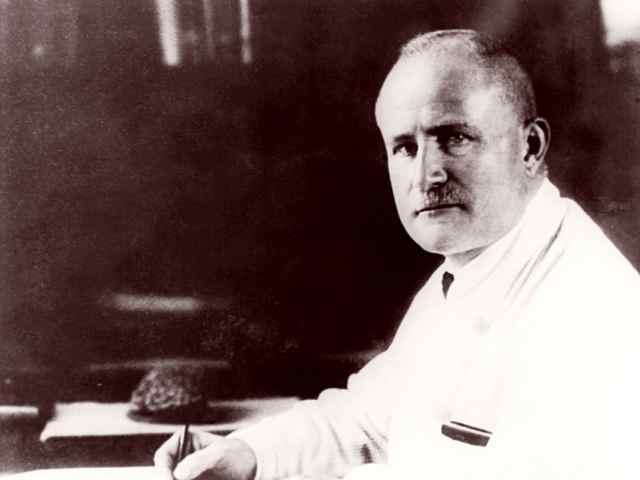
Hans Berger

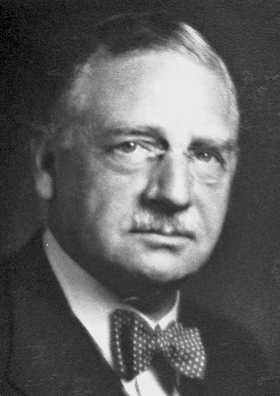
Otto Loewi

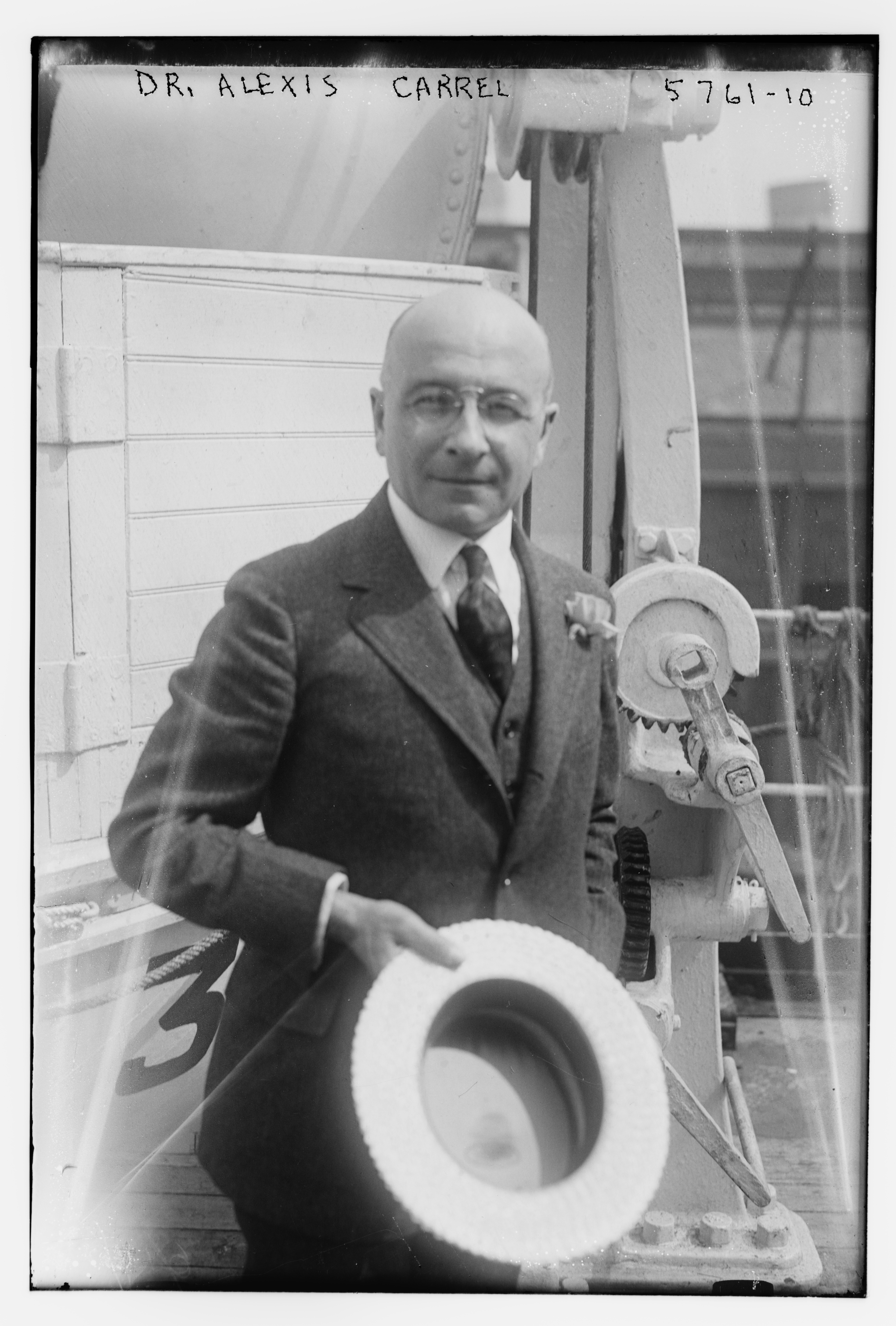
Alexis Carrel

- May 4 – Joe De Grasse, Canadian film director (d. 1940)
- May 5 – Leon Czolgosz, assassin of U.S. President William McKinley (d. 1901)
- May 9 – Anton Cermak, Mayor of Chicago (d. 1933)
- May 10 – Cary D. Landis, American attorney and politician (d. 1938)
- May 15 – Oskari Tokoi, Finnish socialist and the Chairman of the Senate of Finland (d. 1963)
- May 17
  - Henri Barbusse, French novelist, journalist (d. 1935)
  - Dorothy Richardson, English feminist writer (d. 1957)
- May 21 – Hans Berger, German neurologist (d. 1941)
- May 28 – D. D. Sheehan, Irish politician (d. 1948)
- June 2 – Anna Eliza Williams, British supercentenarian and oldest person in the world (d. 1987)
- June 3 – Otto Loewi, German-born pharmacologist, recipient of the Nobel Prize in Physiology or Medicine (d. 1961)
- June 15 – Leonora Cohen, British suffragette and trade unionist (d. 1978)
- June 28 – Alexis Carrel, French surgeon and biologist, recipient of the Nobel Prize in Physiology or Medicine (d. 1944)
- June 29 – Monroe Dunaway Anderson, Founder of Anderson, Clayton and Company; "Father of Texas Medical Center" (d. 1939)

=== July–August ===
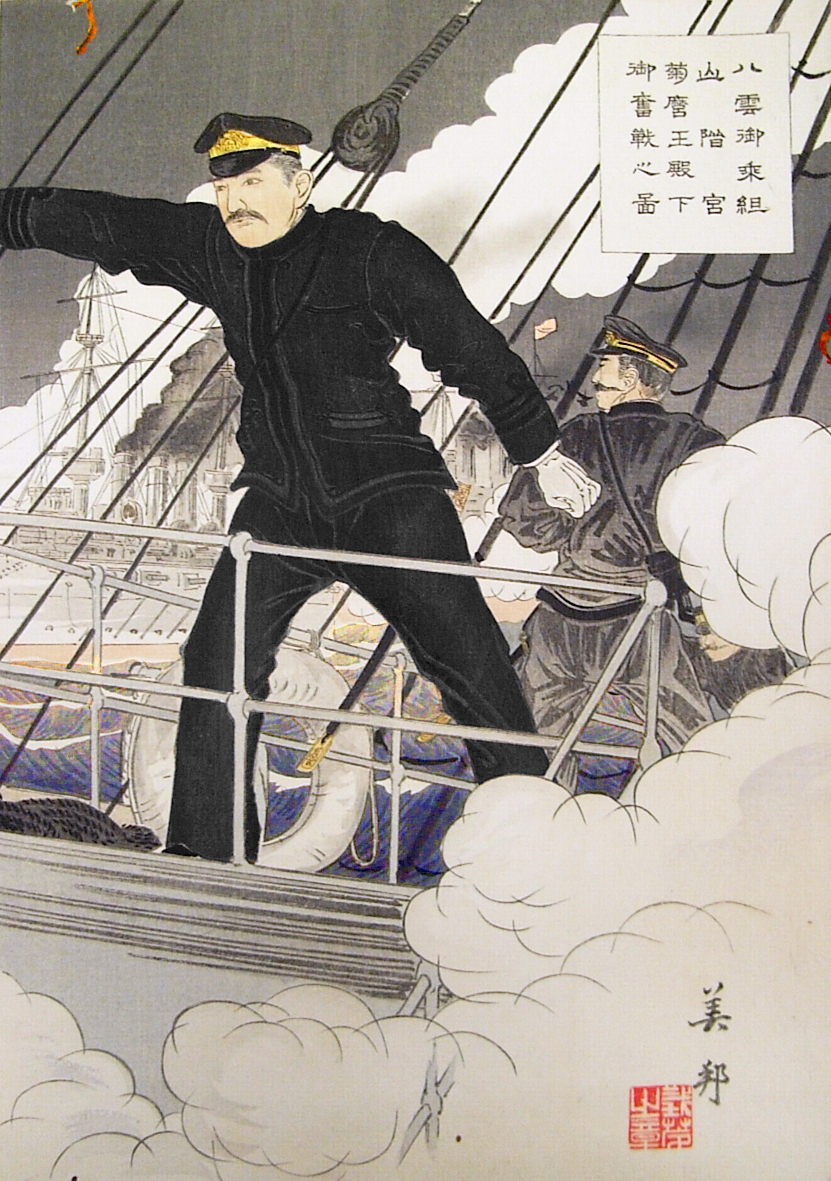
Prince Yamashina Kikumaro

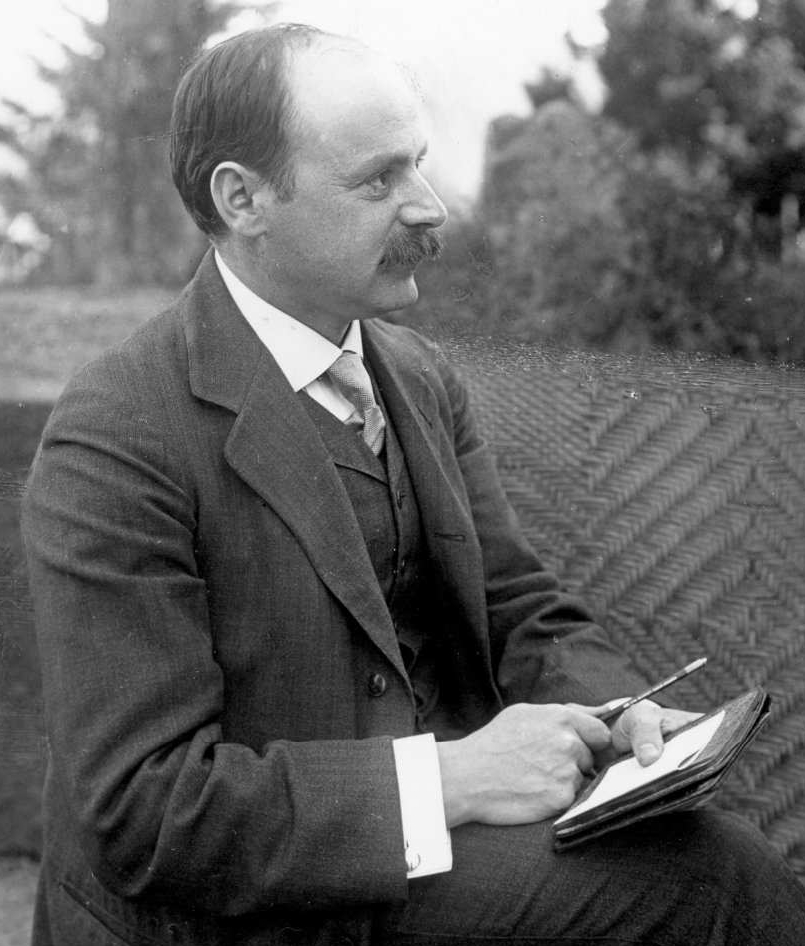
Karl Schwarzschild

- July 1
  - Alice Guy-Blaché, French-American filmmaker (d. 1968)
  - Andrass Samuelsen, 1st prime minister of Faroe Islands (d. 1954)
- July 3 – Prince Yamashina Kikumaro, Japanese prince (d. 1908)
- July 6 – Dimitrios Maximos, Prime Minister of Greece (d. 1955)
- July 8 – Carl Vaugoin, 7th Chancellor of Austria (d. 1949)
- July 12 – Oscar von Sydow, 18th prime minister of Sweden (d. 1936)
- July 17 – Many Benner, French painter (d. 1965)
- July 20 – Alberto Santos-Dumont, Brazilian aviation pioneer (d. 1932)
- August 4 – Dámaso Berenguer, Spanish general and politician (d. 1953)
- August 5 – Joseph Russell Knowland, American politician, newspaperman (d. 1966)
- August 10 – William Ernest Hocking, American philosopher (d. 1966)
- August 13 – Cornelis Jacobus Langenhoven, South African author (d. 1932)
- August 17 – John A. Sampson, American gynecologist (d. 1946)
- August 18 – Otto Harbach, American lyricist (d. 1963)
- August 20 – William Henry Bell, 1st director of the South African College of Music (d. 1946)
- August 21 – Harry T. Morey, American actor (d. 1936)
- August 26 – Lee de Forest, American inventor (d. 1961)

=== September–October ===
- September 1
  - Sir Guy Standing, British actor (d. 1937)
  - João Ferreira Sardo, Portuguese presbyter and founder of Gafanha da Nazaré (d. 1925)
  - Felicija Bortkevičienė, Lithuanian politician and publisher (d. 1945)
- September 5 – Cornelius Vanderbilt III, American military officer, inventor, engineer (d. 1942)
- September 8
  - Alfred Jarry, French author and playwright (d. 1907)
  - David O. McKay, 9th president of the Church of Jesus Christ of Latter-day Saints (d. 1970)
- September 17 – Ibrahim of Johor, Malaysian sultan (d. 1959)
- September 20
  - Sidney Olcott, Canadian-born pioneer film director (d. 1949)
  - Ferenc Szisz, Hungarian-born racing driver (d. 1944)
- September 21 – Papa Jack Laine, American jazz musician (d. 1966)
- October 8 – Ma Barker, American criminal (d. 1935)
- October 9 – Karl Schwarzschild, German physicist, astronomer (d. 1916)
- October 13 – Georgios Kafantaris, Prime Minister of Greece (d. 1946)
- October 14 – Ray Ewry, American athlete (d. 1937)
- October 16 – Juho Kekkonen, Finnish forestry manager and tenant farmer (d. 1928)
- October 18 – Ivanoe Bonomi, 2-time prime minister of Italy (d. 1951)
- October 19
  - Jaap Eden, Dutch skater, cyclist (d. 1925)
  - Bart King, American cricketer (d. 1965)
- October 20 – Jussi Merinen, Finnish politician (d. 1918)
- October 26
  - Thorvald Stauning, 9th Prime Minister of Denmark (d. 1942)
  - A. K. Fazlul Huq, Bengali statesman (d. 1962)
- October 30
  - Dave Gallaher, New Zealand rugby union football player (d. 1917)
  - Francisco I. Madero, 33rd president of Mexico (d. 1913)

=== November–December ===
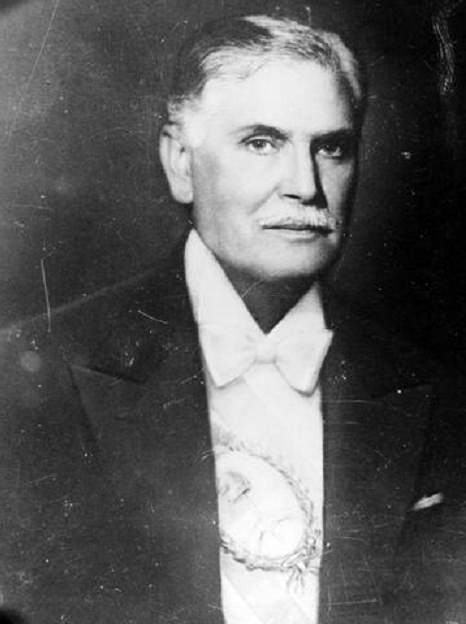
Ramón Castillo

- November 9 – Fritz Thyssen, German industrialist (d. 1951)
- November 16 – W. C. Handy, American blues composer (d. 1958)
- November 20 – Ramón Castillo, Argentinian politician, 25th President of Argentina (d. 1944)
- November 22 – Johnny Tyldesley, English cricketer (d. 1930)
- November 28 – Frank Phillips, American oil executive (d. 1950)
- November 30 – William Boyle, 12th Earl of Cork, British admiral (d. 1967)
- December 7 – Willa Cather, American novelist (d. 1947)
- December 11 – Josip Plemelj, Slovenian mathematician (d. 1967)
- December 17 – Ford Madox Ford, English writer (d. 1939)
- December 20 – Kan'ichi Asakawa, Japanese historian (d. 1948)
- December 26 – Thomas Wass, Nottinghamshire cricketer (d. 1953)
- December 30 – Al Smith, American politician, Democratic presidential candidate (d. 1944)

=== Date unknown ===
- Nesaruddin Ahmad, Bengali Islamic scholar (d. 1952)
- Filip Mișea, Aromanian activist, physician and politician (d. 1944)

== Deaths ==
=== January–June ===
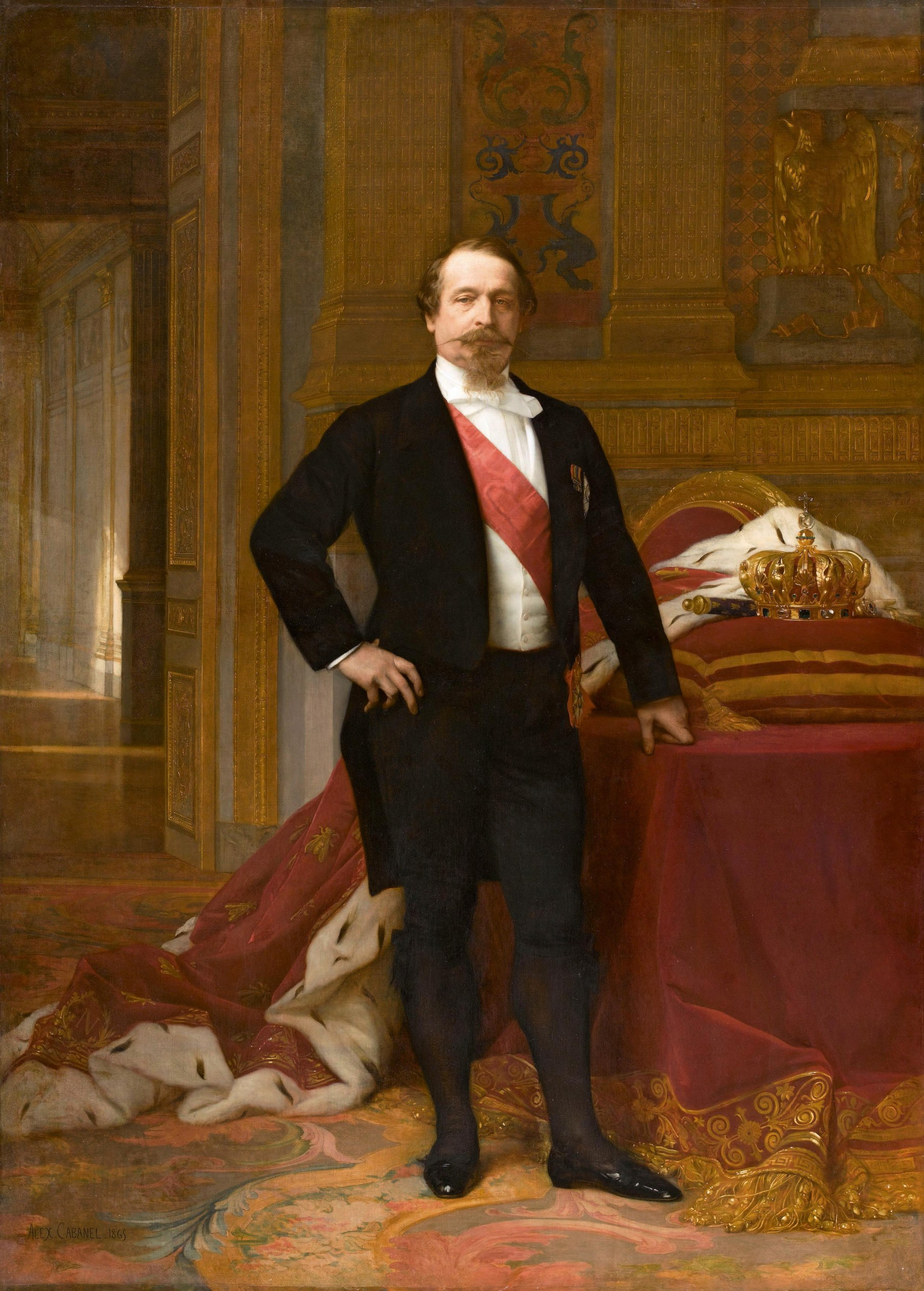
Napoleon III

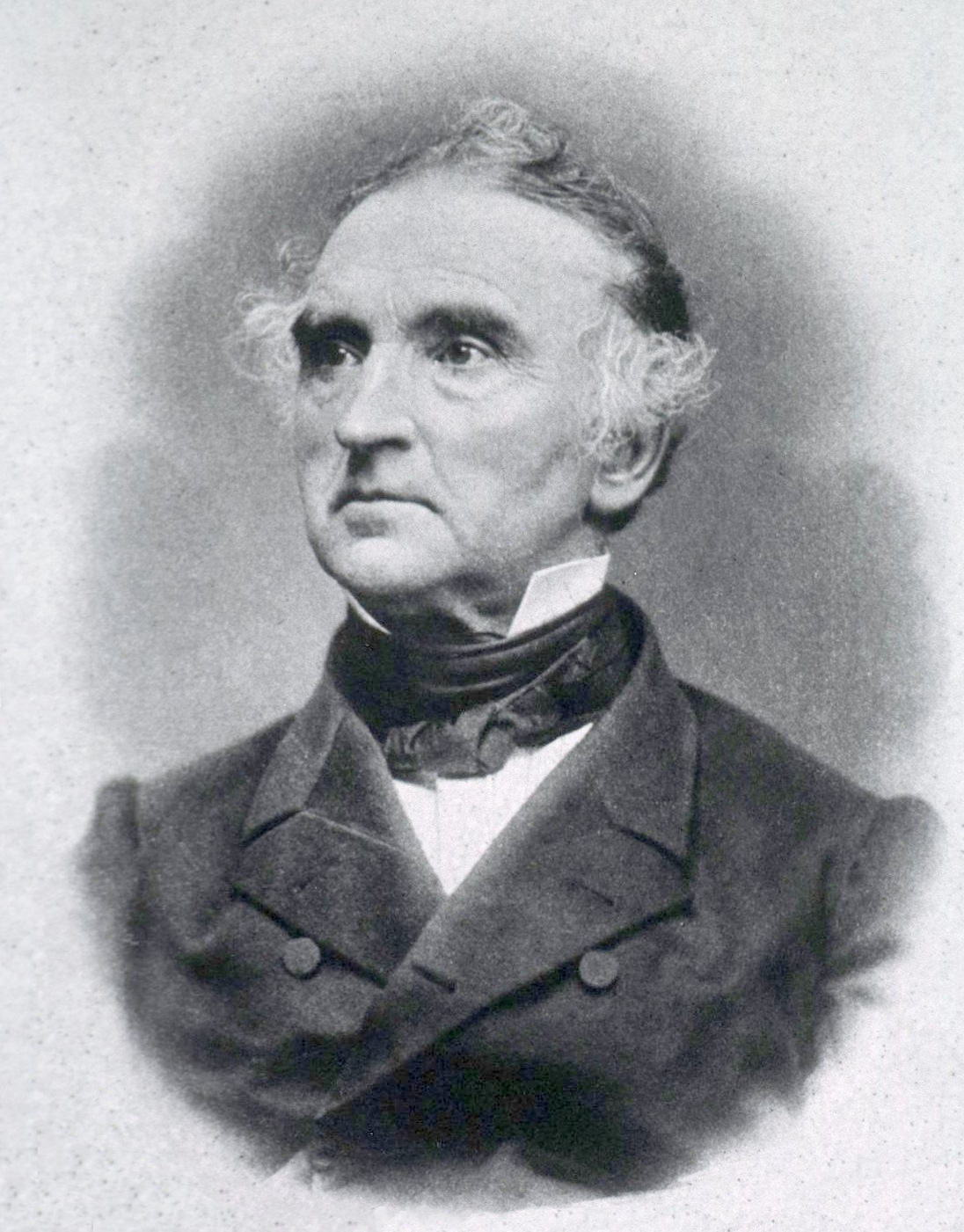
Justus von Liebig

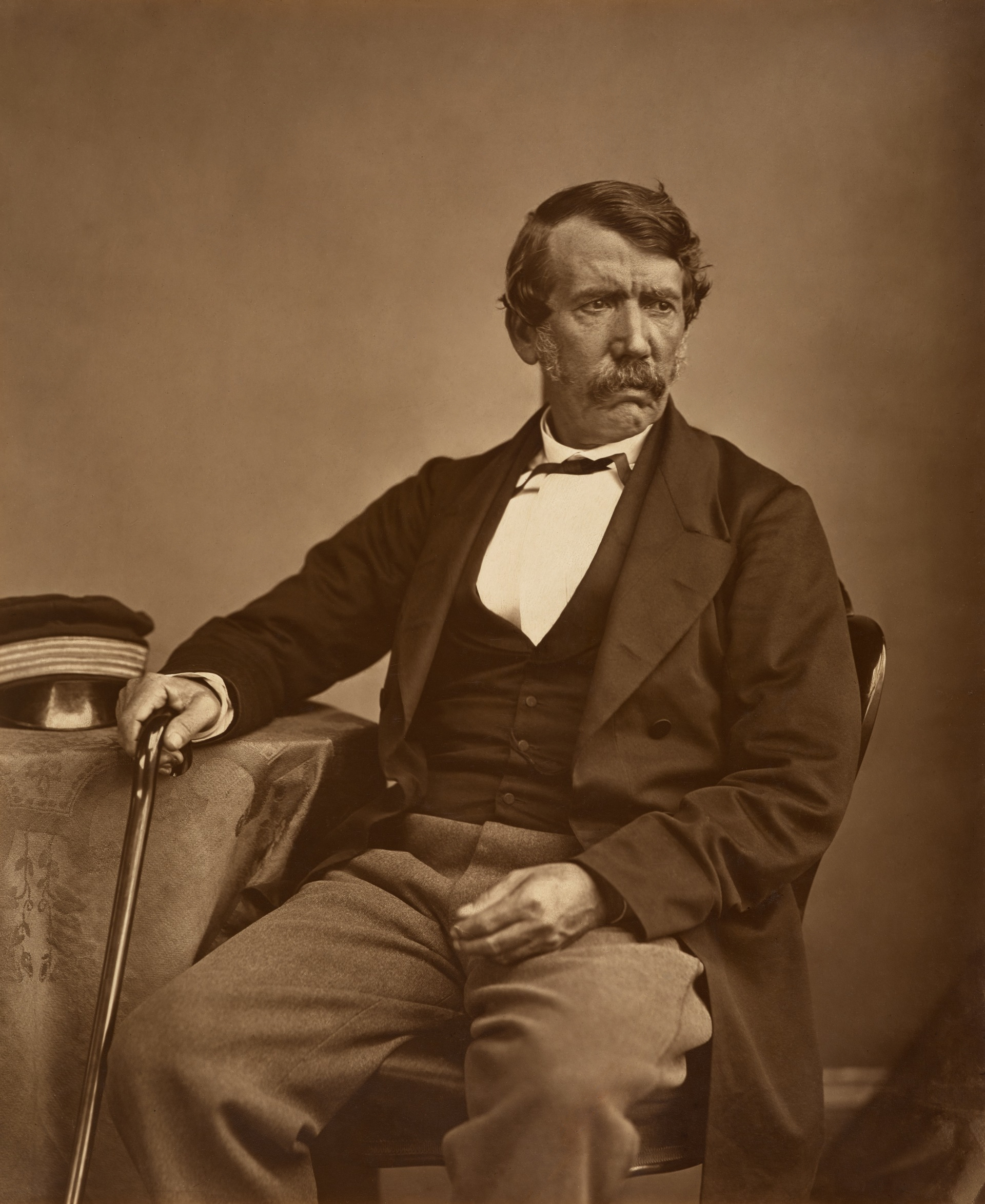
David Livingstone

- January 9 – Napoleon III, last Emperor of the French (b. 1808)
- January 18 – Edward Bulwer-Lytton, 1st Baron Lytton, English novelist (b. 1803)
- January 20 – Basil Moreau, French founder of the Congregation of Holy Cross (b. 1799)
- January 23 – Ramalinga Swamigal, Hindu religious leader (b. 1823)
- January 26 – Empress Amélie, consort of Pedro I of Brazil (b. 1812)
- February 3 – Isaac Baker Brown, English gynaecologist, surgeon (b. 1811)
- February 7 – Sheridan Le Fanu, Irish writer (b. 1814)
- February 18 – Vasil Levski, Bulgarian revolutionary (executed) (b. 1837)
- February 23 – Jakob von Hartmann, Bavarian general (b. 1795)
- March 10 – John Torrey, American botanist (b. 1796)
- March 24 – Mary Ann Cotton, English serial killer (executed) (b. 1832)
- March 25 – Wilhelm Marstrand, Danish painter (b. 1810)
- March 29 – Prince Unakan Ananta Norajaya Prince of Siam (b. 1856)
- March 31
  - Maria Magdalena Mathsdotter, Swedish Sámi educator (b. 1835)
  - Hugh Maxwell, American lawyer, politician (b. 1787)
- April 11
  - Edward Canby, American general (b. 1817)
  - Christopher Hansteen, Norwegian geophysicist (b. 1784)
- April 18 – Justus von Liebig, German chemist (b. 1803)
- April 27 – William Charles Macready, English actor (b. 1793)
- April 29 – Hortense Globensky-Prévost, Canadian heroine (b. 1804)
- May 1 – David Livingstone, Scottish explorer of Africa (b. 1813)
- May 5 – Jerónimo Carrión, 8th president of Ecuador (b. 1804)
- May 6 – José Antonio Páez, first president of Venezuela (b. 1790)
- May 7
  - Salmon P. Chase, Chief Justice of the United States (b. 1808)
  - John Stuart Mill, British philosopher (b. 1806)
- May 13 – Charles Lucy, English painter (b. 1814)
- May 15 – Alexandru Ioan Cuza, first ruler of Romania (b. 1820)
- May 20 – George-Étienne Cartier, Canadian statesman (b. 1814)
- May 22 – Alessandro Manzoni, Italian poet and novelist (b. 1785)
- May 29 – Édouard de Verneuil, French palaeontologist (b. 1805)
- May 30 – Karamat Ali Jaunpuri, Indian Muslim scholar (b. 1800)
- June 1 – Joseph Howe, Canadian politician (b. 1804)

=== July–December ===
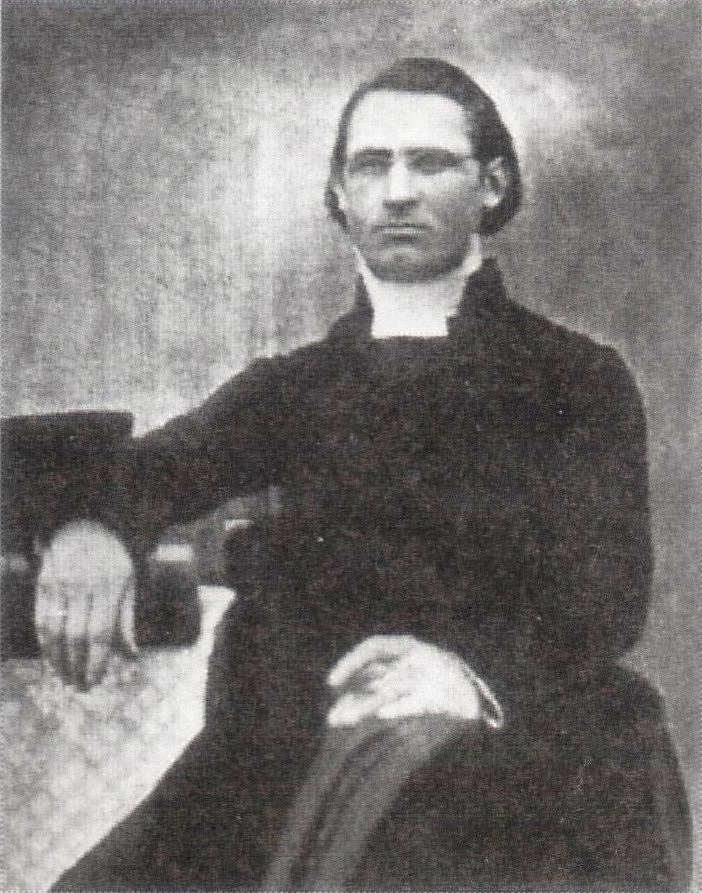
Johan Gabriel Ståhlberg

- August 18 – Charles II, Duke of Brunswick (b. 1804)
- August 31 – Charles Ferdinand Pahud, Governor-General of the Dutch East Indies (b. 1803)
- September 8 – Johan Gabriel Ståhlberg, Finnish priest and father of K. J. Ståhlberg, the first President of Finland (b. 1832)
- September 11 – Agustín Fernando Muñoz, Duke of Riánsares, morganatic husband of Maria Christina of the Two Sicilies (b. 1808)
- September 17 – Alexander Berry, Scottish adventurer, Australian pioneer (b. 1781)
- September 22 – Friedrich Frey-Herosé, Swiss Federal Councilor (b. 1801)
- September 23 – Jean Chacornac, French astronomer (b. 1823)
- September 28 – Émile Gaboriau, French writer (b. 1833)
- October 5 – William Todd, American businessman, Canadian Senate nominee (b. 1803)
- October 9 – George Ormerod, English historian, antiquarian (b. 1785)
- October 17 – Sir Robert McClure, British Arctic explorer (b. 1807)
- December 14
  - Louis Agassiz, Swiss-born geologist, naturalist (b. 1807)
  - Alexander Keith, Scottish-born brewer, mayor of Halifax, Nova Scotia (b. 1795)
