= Azaka =

Azaka are a family of loa in Haitian mythology. The name is shared between:

- Azaka Medeh - loa of harvest
- Azaka-Tonnerre - loa of thunder

== See also ==
- Asaka (disambiguation)
