= Asaka Kubo =

Japanese musician

Asaka Kubo (久保 亜沙香, Kubo Asaka) is the lead vocal singer of the group A+Jyuc.^{[3]} She currently belongs to the show-business production company PLATINUM-S, and is a former member of Pyw-A.

She was born on January 20, 1979, in Kanagawa Prefecture, Japan. She got her start in 1998 when she was scouted and given the opportunity to become a gravure idol. She posed primarily in school uniforms & underwear. Along with the usual gravure idol photosets she also produced a seminude photograph collection (also known as a photobook) and an image video. She switched companies in 2000 and stopped temporarily in 2001 for unknown reasons. In late 2002 she re-emerged and released her final photobook. She has since turned her attention to singing and has been active ever since, performing various stage events. In 2005, she started a music group called Pyw-A, but was unsuccessful. A year later in 2006, she started a new group called A+Jyuc.

A+Jyuc stands for Asaka + the first letter in the name of each member in the group:

- Asaka - vocals
- Jun - bass
- You - guitar
- Ume - keyboard
- Coro chang - drums

The group has not performed in any concerts or for large audiences and it is unknown how popular her music is. Nevertheless, her group still manages to release at least one CD a year, along with an average of three stage performances a month.^{[1]}^{[3]}

== Works ==
=== DVDs ===
- [2000.04.15] Etude
- [2005.05.21] Kossapa 1 (with Akari and Yoshioka Mika)

=== Photobooks ===
- [1998.12.10] 亜沙香, Asaka
- [1999.08.20] めだかの学校, Medaka no Gakkou
- [2000.05.20] クボと、ぼく, Kubou, Boku.
- [2002.09.28] あの頃を忘れない, Ano Koro wo Wasurenai

=== Albums ===
- [2002.10.10] Lovey
- [2003.08.10] Asaka Party
- [2004.01.20] Asaka Collection!!
- [2004.04.29] Choose
- [2005.01.20] Asaka Mode
- [2005.08.28] Kanon -Camellia-
- [2006.01.20] Asaka Style ~unplugged~
- [2007.01.20] aquarium
- [2008.03.21] Luna
- [2013.01.21] A-muse

=== Singles ===
- [2003.05.11] Curtain Call
- [2003.05.11] Happy Perfume
- [2003.11.30] 24 Nijyu-yon
- [2004.06.06] 20 Seiki Mirai Robot Boueitai Tederosu Image Song
- [2004.07.03] Pray ~ 2004
- [2004.09.20] Passionata

== Sources ==
1 - Platinum S Website 2 - Profile written by Asaka Kubo herself 3 - A+Jyuc
