= Takekazu Asaka =

Japanese linguist

- Born: December 1952 (age 73); Tokyo
- Occupations: Linguist and Lecturer

Takekazu Asaka (in Japanese: 浅香 武和), born in Tokyo in 1952, is a Japanese linguist and lecturer of Philology at the Tsuda University, Tokyo. He translated the works of Galician authors such as Rosalía de Castro, Ramón Cabanillas and Uxío Novoneyra into Japanese, and published the first Galician grammar book in Japanese. He defines himself as "ambassador of Galician culture in Japan."

He is also responsible for organizing Galician music and poetry festivals in Tokyo, and in other cities, to celebrate Galician Literature Day. Since June 2017, he has been made an academic correspondent of the Royal Galician Academy in recognition of his work.

== Career ==
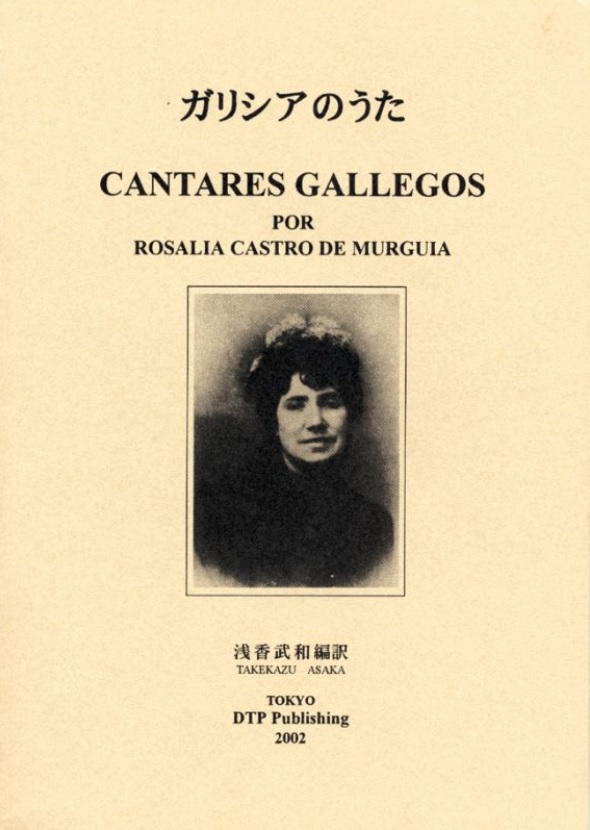
Cantares gallegos, Tokyo.

He visited Galicia for the first time in 1989 while attending the 19th International Congress of Philology and Romance Linguistics, and since he discovered Galician language and Galician culture, and became its great supporter. He is a teacher of Spanish grammar in Tokyo and takes courses in Galician language and culture. In 2002, he translated Cantares gallegos (Galician songs) into Japanese, which was published by DTP Publication. In 2014, he translated Contos da miña terra (Stories of My Land) into Japanese, which was published by DTP Publishing, with a preface by Marie de Carmen Rios Panisse, and a CD containing the texts in audio version.

In 2017, he published a bilingual edition of Uxío Novoneyra's The Eidos.

== Works ==
- Grammar of Modern Galician (bilingual, Japanese-Galician). (1993) Tokyo: Daigakusyorin. (195 pages; ISBN 4-475-01807-2)
- A Guide to Conversational Galician (1994)
- Basic Vocabulary of the Galician Language. (1996) Tokyo: Daigakusyorin. (ISBN 4-475-01231-7). (The first 122 pages are a Galician-Castilian-Japanese index. The following 158 pages are Castilian-Galician equivalents and the rest of the book is devoted to the Japanese-Galician equivalence dictionary. The introductory text of the book indicates that it contains 2600 equivalences.)
- Songs of Galicia (in Galician) (Translated into Japanese in 2002). DTP Publishing.
- Cantata a Ramón Cabanillas (in Galician) (2013)
- The Story of my Land (Translated into Japanese in 2014)
- Xograr Martín Codax (in Galician) (2015)
- New Grammar of Galician (in Galician) (2017)
- Os Eidos (Galician-Japanese bilingual edition published in 2017)
