= Anne Hill (actress) =

Canadian stage actress and ballet dancer

Anne (Amelia) Hill née Fairbrother (London, 1804–1896, Montreal) was a Canadian stage actress and ballet dancer. She was a popular actress and dancer during her active years in 1846–1861; after her retirement, she had a second career as a dance instructor, in which she also attained fame.

== Life ==
She was one of six children of Robert Fairbrother, dancer and acrobat, and Mary Bailey. She married the actor Charles John Hill in 1826.

=== Career in Britain ===
Anne Fairbrother made her debut as Cora's child in Pizarro, by Richard Brinsley Butler Sheridan on London's Drury Lane Theatre in 1816, and was a member of the corps de ballet there. She performed ballet and minor roles in the Surrey and Sadler's Wells theatres in 1819-25. After her marriage, she toured Britain with her spouse, but was not given much attention because of the frequent interruptions of childbirth on her career. In 1835-1837, Anne was engaged at the Drury Lane and Surrey theatres as a dancer and pantomime actress, where she enjoyed considerable success and was appointed principal dancer. In 1837-1840, they were again active in provincial theatres. In 1840, her husband was the manager of Brighton's Theatre Royal when it went bankrupt because of his mismanagement, causing the family to flee to America.

=== Career in America ===
Anne Hill made her American début as an actor and dancer at New York's Park Theatre on 2 September 1840. She was a success, and considered as “one of the most versatile and useful actresses.” The Hills made their debut in Canada at the Theatre Royal, Montréal, 26 June 1843, and continued to be active at that theatre for six years. She was given good reviews and called the “most graceful dancer we have seen” and that she “astonished and delighted the lieges of Montreal by her charming performances.” During the theatre's closing periods in winter, the Hills ran a dancing academy. From 1846 to 1849, when the Montreal theatre was closed during summers, the Hill family toured Upper Canada: Anne Hill danced and acted, Charles Hill served as a manager and character actor, their son Charles John Barton played romantic leads, their daughter Rosalie was second dancer and ingénue, and their younger son Robert Herbert was a box-office manager, while local amateurs played supporting roles. They were normally given good critic and enjoyed success in the towns they visited.

In 1849 the theatre in Montreal was closed, and the Hills was engaged at Charles Kemble Mason's company in Toronto. In 1851, the Hill's family split due to their children's marriages, and Anne Hill was given a benefit performance, during which the Toronto Patriot stated:

“She has won the esteem of all, not merely by her grace and elegance and consequent success in this department, but also by her extreme good temper, good sense and kindness of disposition. As a performer her merits are well known; but the extent of her histrionic exertions in favour of others is known only to a few.”

Anne Hill toured in the United States and Canada with her husband until 1861, when she separated from her spouse and settled in Montreal, where she was active as an actor until her death.
