= Fukushima Prefectural Asaka High School =

Public school in Koriyama, Fukushima, Japan

- 福島県立安積高等学校
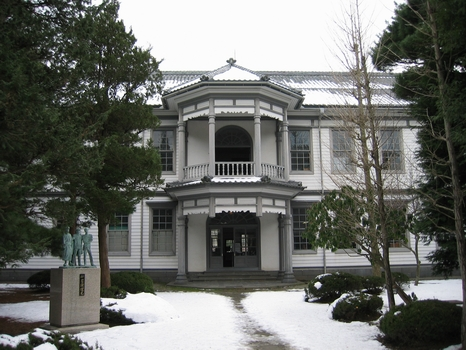
- Asaka High School in winter

Location
- Koriyama; Japan
- Coordinates: 37°23′30″N 140°21′02″E

Information
- Established: September 11, 1884; 141 years ago
- Website: asaka-h.fks.ed.jp

Fukushima Prefectural Asaka High School (福島県立安積高等学校, Fukushima-ken Ritsu Asaka Kōtō Gakkō), abbreviated as Anko (安高, Ankō), is the regionally prestigious prefectural high school in Koriyama city, Fukushima, Japan. It was founded on September 11, 1884, originally as Fukushima Junior High School. After being renamed Asaka Junior High School in 1948, it was changed into a high school due to the restructure of the Japanese education system on April 1, 1948.

== History ==
Asaka High School was a boys' school for a long time, but has recently become coeducational. Simultaneously, it abolished its rule mandating school uniforms.

The old building, which had been formerly used as the main building of former Fukushima ordinary junior high school Fukushima-ken Jinjo Chugakko (福島県尋常中学校, Fukushima-ken Jinjō Chūgakkō), is conserved in the front of its site, as the Asaka history museum. It was designated a cultural heritage site in 1977. The museum was deemed unsafe to enter after the 2011 Tōhoku earthquake and tsunami.

Asaka High School has promoted the themes "Frontier Spirit", "Literary and Military arts", and "Spartan".

It has a rivalry with Fukushima High School and Iwaki High School.

== Notable alumni ==
- Hiroyuki Arai
- Kwan-Ichi Asakawa
- Kōichirō Gemba
- Toru Iwaya
- Masao Kume
- Nakayama Gishu
- Teruhiko Mashiko
- Takumi Nemoto
- Eisaku Satō (governor)
- Shinzo Shinjo
- Takayama Chogyū
- Toshio Tamogami
- Joji Yuasa
