= Chō Kōran =

Japanese poet and artist

- Born: 1804; Sone, Mino Province, Japan
- Died: 1879 (aged 74–75)
- Occupations: Poet, artist
- Spouse: Yanagawa Seigan

Chō Kōran (張 紅蘭; 1804–1879) was a Japanese poet and artist, known for her study of Chinese arts and specialization in bunjinga ink paintings. She traveled extensively across Japan with her husband, fellow poet [Yanagawa Seigan], and her poetry and artwork was published in several volumes. Later in life, she founded a private school and taught Chinese poetry to women.

== Early life ==
Kōran was born in 1804 in the village of Sone in Mino Province (now Gifu Prefecture). Her father was a country samurai. Kōran's parents encouraged her formal education – an unusual move in a culture that did not prioritize early academic learning for girls – and Kōran subsequently learned to read and write Chinese from her uncle, a priest at the Kakeiji temple.

== Marriage and artistic career ==
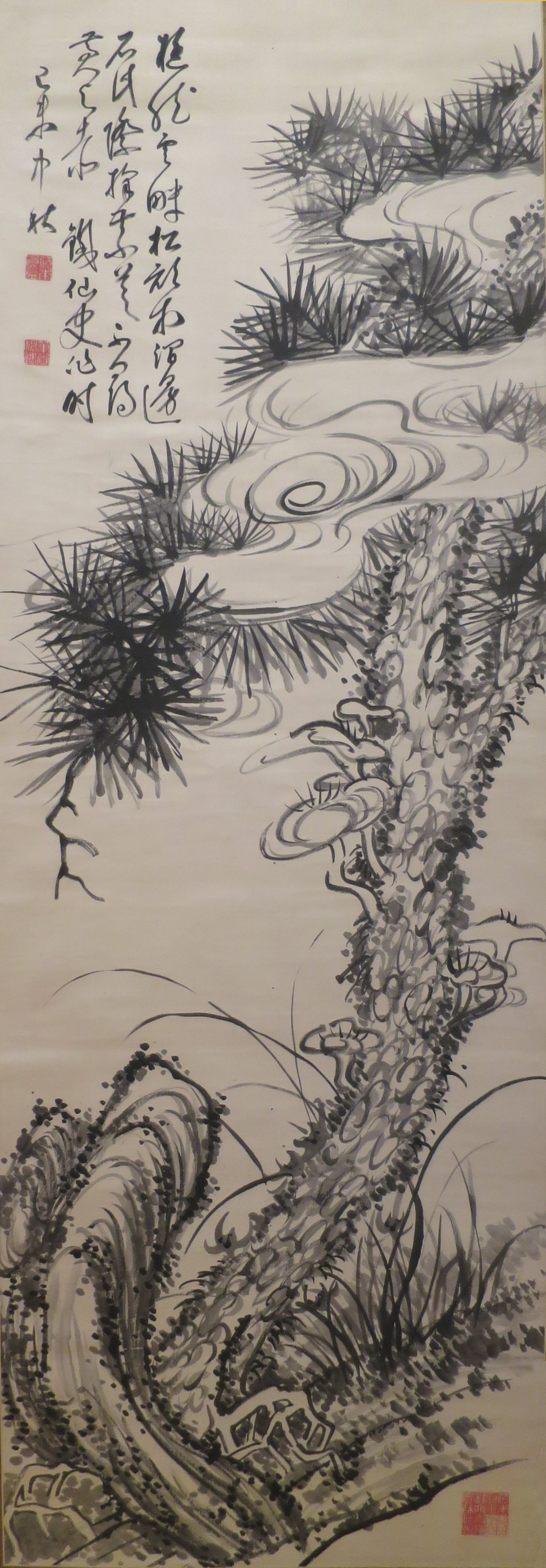
A 19th-century Japanese literati painting of a pine tree, similar to what Chō Kōran's ink paintings may have looked like.

As a teenager, Kōran studied Chinese poetry under the instruction of well-known poet Yanagawa Seigan (1789–1858), and their relationship developed into something more. When Kōran was 17, she married Seigan.

The couple traveled across Japan after their marriage, meeting fellow scholars, poets and artists, alongside new patrons. In 1822, Kōran and Seigan became founding members of the Hakuosha (White Seagull) Poetry Society. Kōran's interest in Chinese arts increased. After several years of travel, the couple settled in Kyoto. Kōran studied a type of ink art called bunjinga – styled after Chinese literati painting – and her reputation as an artist began to flourish. She drew attention for her ink paintings in the "Four Gentlemen" genre, creating images of bamboo, orchid, plum, and chrysanthemum. Kōran often inscribed poems on her paintings. She sometimes collaborated with fellow Japanese painter Yoshida Shuran, who was known for her paintings of orchids. By 1830, Kōran was listed as a specialist of bunjinga in the publication Heian jinbutsu shi (Record of Heian [Kyoto] Notables).

In 1832, the couple moved to Edo (now Tokyo), and Seigan founded a school. Kōran's talent as a painter was attracting public notice, and an illustration of one of her bamboo paintings was included in the Hyaku meika gafu (Album of Calligraphy and Painting by 100 Artists), published in 1837. Four years later, Kōran published a book of her poems titled Kōran kōshu (selected poems by Kōran). With her earnings from the sale of her paintings, Kōran was now able to supplement her husband's income.

In 1845, the couple moved to Ōgaki, a town in Gifu Prefecture. Kōran began learning to play the Chinese qin, a seven-stringed zither instrument. During their time in Edo, they had become acquainted with people who were pursuing government reforms, and by the 1850s authorities had begun to persecute reformers. In 1858, several of Kōran and Seigan's friends were arrested, and the couple found themselves under similar suspicion. Seigan fell abruptly ill with cholera, dying that same year, and Kōran was arrested by authorities and kept in prison for six months.

After being released from prison, Kōran proceeded to establish her own private school, where she taught Chinese poetry to other women and girls. Kōran continued to write poetry and paint bunjinga, remaining active in the literary and artistic community for the rest of her life.

== Death and legacy ==
Kōran died in 1879. By the time of her death, she had written approximately 400 poems. A collection of poems from the latter half of her life was published posthumously, titled Kōran ikō (posthumous manuscripts of Kōran).

In Ōgaki, there is a memorial hall dedicated to Kōran and Seigan.
