= Kan'ichi Asakawa =

Japanese historian (1873–1948)

- 朝河 貫一
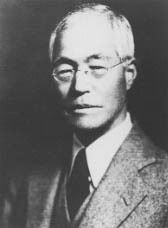
- Asakawa in 1940
- Born: December 20, 1873; Nihonmatsu, Fukushima, Japan
- Died: August 11, 1948 (aged 74); West Wardsboro, Vermont, U.S.
- Education: Waseda University; Dartmouth College (BLitt); Yale University (PhD)
- Occupation: Historian

Kan'ichi Asakawa (朝河 貫一, Asakawa Kan'ichi; December 20, 1873 – August 11, 1948) was a Japanese academic, author, historian, curator and peace advocate. Asakawa was Japanese by birth and citizenship though he lived the majority of his life in the United States.

== Early life and education ==
Asakawa was born in Nihonmatsu, Japan, on December 20, 1873; his parents were Masazumi and Uta. Asakawa was educated at the Fukushima-ken Jinjo School in Fukushima Prefecture and at Waseda University in Tokyo before he traveled to the United States to study at Dartmouth College in Hanover, New Hampshire. There, he was awarded his Bachelor of Letters degree in 1899. He continued his studies at Yale University, earning his Doctor of Philosophy in history in 1902 with a dissertation entitled "The Reform of 645: An Introduction to the Study of the Origin of Feudalism in Japan".

== Career ==
Asakawa lectured at Dartmouth College in 1902; was a professor at Waseda University (1906–07); an instructor at Yale University (1907–10); and became an assistant professor at Yale University in 1910. He carried on special research in Japan in 1906–07 and 1917–19. He became a professor at Yale University in 1937, becoming the first Japanese professor at a major American university. He was the author of many works on Japan, his scholarly interest being medieval history. He taught history at Yale for 35 years. Among those he influenced was John Whitney Hall.

In 1907, Asakawa was appointed curator of the East Asian Collection at Yale's Sterling Memorial Library.

Asakawa helped found Asian studies in the United States.

== Political perspective ==
After the end of the Russo-Japanese War, Asakawa began to speak out against the growth of militarism in Japan. He dedicated himself to serving as a bridge between the United States and Japan to promote amicable relations. In 1941, he sought to avert war between Japan and the United States by trying to convince President Roosevelt to reach out to the Japanese emperor with a personal telegram. After Japan attacked Pearl Harbor, Asakawa believed that Japan would lose the war and sought to prepare both states for an amicable and cooperative relationship after the war.

== Legacy ==
Every summer, Dartmouth students who are studying abroad in Japan take a trip to Asakawa's hometown of Nihonmatsu and pay homage by visiting both the high school where he studied, and his grave site. Some of his remains are interred at Kanairo Cemetery in Nihonmatsu, and others are interred in the Grove Street Cemetery, New Haven, Connecticut.

In 2007 the Asakawa garden in Saybrook College, designed by Shinichiro Abe, was dedicated to mark the centennial of Asakawa's appointment as an instructor of history at Yale.

== Personal life ==
Asakawa's wife Miriam was born in 1879 (exact date unknown) in New Haven, Connecticut, to father David R. Dingwall and mother Catherine Cameron Dingwall. Her parents were Scottish immigrants who set out for the United States after their marriage. Miriam's occupation was a seamstress. She met Asakawa when he was a doctoral student at Yale University after graduating from Dartmouth College in 1899 with a Bachelor of Letters degree. When Asakawa received a Ph.D. degree in 1902 and was an instructor at Dartmouth College, the two married on October 12, 1905, at a church in Crown Point, Essex County, New York, and became a formal couple under church law.

According to reports at the time, the marriage was "a very happy one," but Miriam died on February 4, 1913, and was buried in the Dingwall family graveyard at Evergreen Cemetery in New Haven, Connecticut, owned by Miriam's family. Subsequently, Asakawa never remarried and remained single; they had no children.

== Selected works ==
- 1903 – The Early Institutional Life of Japan: A Study in the Reform of 645 A.d. Tokyo: Shueisha. OCLC 4427686; see online, multi-formatted, full-text book at openlibrary.org
- 1905 – The Russo-Japanese Conflict: Its Causes and Issues. Boston: Houghton-Mifflin. OCLC 2418247 [reprinted by Kennikat Press, Port Washington, New York, 1970.
- 1914 – The Origin of Feudal Land-Tenure in Japan (1914)
- 1928 - Japan, vol. VII of History of Nations
- 1929 - The Documents of Iriki

Asakawa's works also included contributions to the publications Japan edited by Capt. F. Brinkley (1904); the History of Nations Series (1907); China and the Far East (1910); Japan and Japanese-American Relations (1912); and The Pacific Ocean in History (1917).
