= Asaka Station =

Asaka Station is the name of two train stations in Japan:

- Asaka Station (Osaka) (浅香駅)
- Asaka Station (Saitama) (朝霞駅)
