= Hortense Globensky-Prévost =

Hortense Globensky-Prévost (1804 - 29 April 1873) also known as Chevalière des Deux-Montagnes and Héroïne du Nord, was a Canadian woman, known for her role as a British loyalist during the Rebellions of 1837–1838; on two famous occasions, she protected the corpse of her spouse from a lynch mob, and prevented rebellions and riots from taking place in Sainte-Scholastique, respectively.
