= María Rosa Urraca Pastor =

Spanish politician (1900–1984)

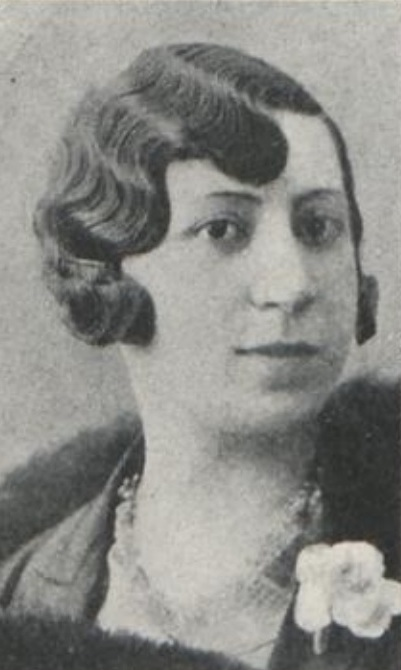
- Born: María Rosa Urraca Pastor; 1900; Madrid, Spain
- Died: 1984 (aged 83–84); Barcelona, Spain
- Occupation: Teacher
- Known for: Orator, propagandist, politician, nurse
- Political party: Comunión Tradicionalista, Falange Española Tradicionalista

María Rosa Urraca Pastor (1900–1984) was a Spanish Carlist politician and propagandist. She is known mostly as a thrilling orator, one of the best public speakers of the Second Spanish Republic. She is also noted as head of Delegación Nacional de Frentes y Hospitales, the Nationalist wartime organization catering for the wounded.

== Family and youth ==
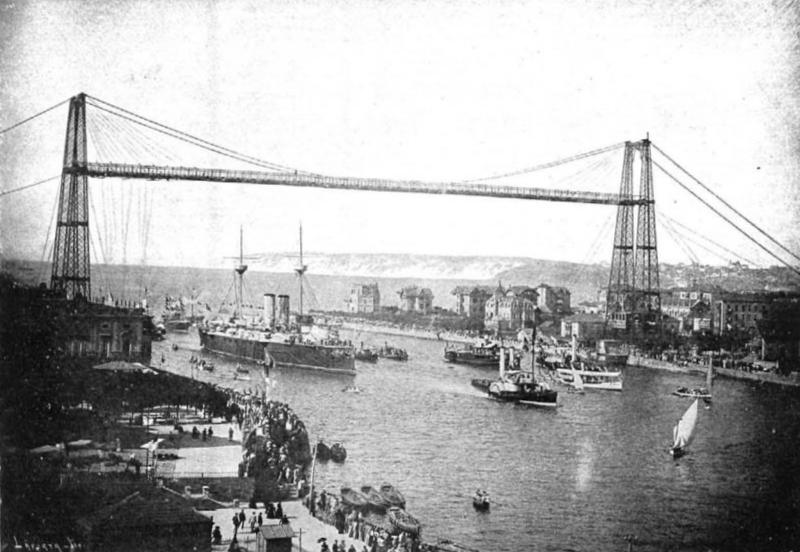
Bilbao around 1900

María Rosa Urraca Pastor's paternal family originated from La Rioja. Her grandfather, Modesto Urraca Victoria, a native of Grañón, was the first reservoir keeper of the pantano de la Grájera. Her father, Juan Urraca Sáenz (1873-1965), was born in Nalda, near Logroño. He joined the army and took part in unspecified combat missions, probably during the Spanish–American War. Back in Spain he first served in Madrid, assigned later to Burgos and finally in the early 20th century to Comisaría de Guerra de Bilbao. In 1913 he was transferred to Cuerpo Auxiliar de Intervención Militar, an intendancy and fiscal administration structure of the military. He first served at modest rank of auxiliar de tercera clase, shortly before retirement promoted to auxiliar mayor in 1928. At unspecified time he married Rafaela Pastor Ortega (died 1941) a native of Villahoz (Burgos). It is not clear how many children the couple had; none of the sources consulted refers to María's siblings.

Though María Rosa was born in Madrid, at the age of 3 she followed her father's professional lot and in her early childhood the family moved from the capital to Burgos and then to Bilbao. She was raised in fervently Catholic ambience, as her father was member of a number of local religious societies like Hermandad de Nuestra Señora de Valvanera; he passed the pious zeal to the daughter. Nothing is known of political views of María's parents, except that her father was a non-Carlist monarchist. Another feature of her upbringing was profound respect for the military, considered the "backbone of the nation". Her early formation was completed by books; she later admitted that at the age of 14 she had been profoundly moved by the works Concepción Arenal and Graciano Martínez. The former advocated active public stance of women in the modern society; the latter, a Catholic friar, pursued the regenerationist path by focusing on social work of the Christians, also underlining the role of females.

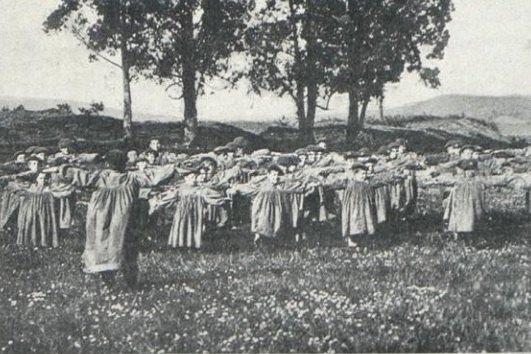
PE at Escuelas Ave Maria

It is not clear where María received her primary education; she later frequented Escuela Normal Superior de Maestras de Vizcaya, graduating in 1923. It is also not evident whether she has ever pursued the university path; herself she claimed having studied Filosofía y Letras, though neither the timing nor location are known; according to her later account, she followed the classes of Miguel de Unamuno and Julián Besteiro. Vivacious, straightforward and vibrant, Urraca commenced her professional career by teaching at La Obra del Ave-María, a network of Catholic schools founded by Andrés Manjón and focused on poverty-stricken children, at unspecified time in the 1920s acting as directora of the Bilbao branch. She also became auxiliary teacher at Escuela Normal de Bilbao, at that time considered the "universidad femenina". Urraca Pastor never married and had no children.

== Early public activity ==
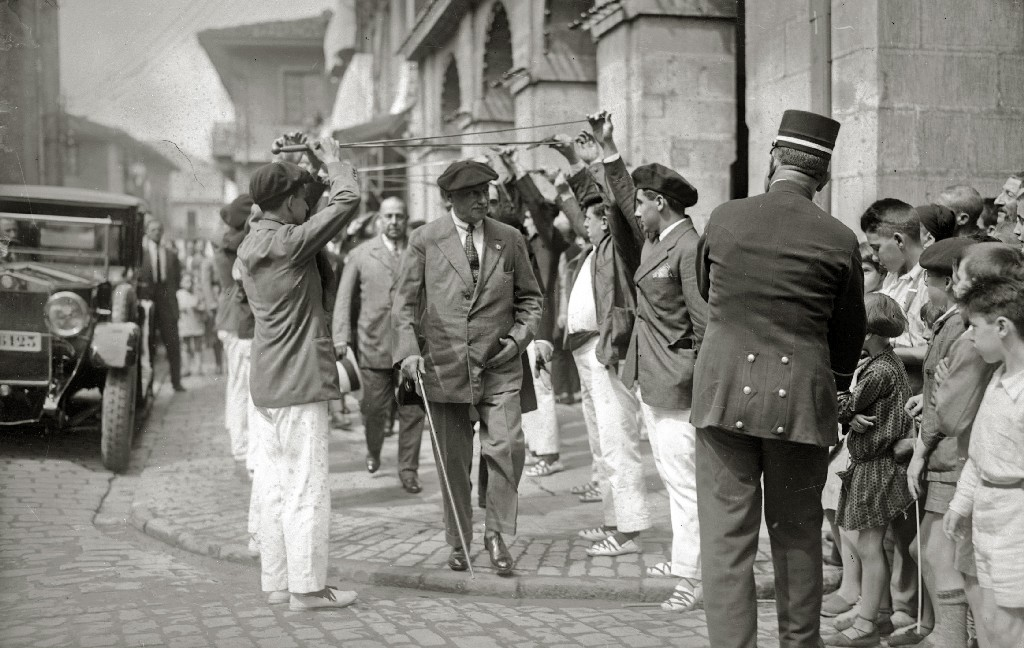
Primo in Vascongadas, 1920s

Urraca first spoke publicly in 1923 during Semana Pedagogica in Bilbao. In the mid-1920s she entered Acción Católica de la Mujer; her insatiable character and a knack for letters produced the 1925 appointment to manager of Boletín de la ACM de Vizcaya. Some scholars claim that by the end of the decade she became president of the entire Bilbao section of ACM. Urraca got enthusiastically involved in a number of social, charity and educational initiatives of the organization, at that time very much encouraged by the Primo de Rivera dictatorship. In the mid-1920s she became engaged in the nascent radio broadcasting; she was noted by the press as occasionally on air giving lectures on cultural subjects and commenced close co-operation with T.S.H., a weekly issued by Asociación Radio Española. She also admitted contributing to El Sol, a Madrid daily of Liberal leaning, though nature of this engagement is rather obscure.

The young María Rosa became a role model for a new breed of Catholic female public activists, opposed to the old-style Catholic wife and mother epitome and throwing themselves in social and education work. A number of senior nationwide ACM militants – including her idol, Carmen Cuesta - entered the primoderiverista quasi-parliament, Asamblea Nacional Consultiva; riding the wave of regime's modernizing attempts and its support for females activists, Urraca was appointed to the official labor administration. In 1929 she was nominated Inspectora De Trabajo, which converted her standing from a Catholic social worker to a state official. She took part in schemes like Patronato De Previsión Social de Vizcaya and Patronato Nacional De Recuperación De Inválidos Para El Trabajo. She started to address social issues by publishing in the press, be it local Biscay titles like El Nervión, La Gaceta del Norte and El Pueblo Vasco or national ones like La Nación. Urraca also started to gain recognition beyond Biscay: professional duties brought her to other regions and ACM assignment enabled her to take part in 1929 Congreso Femenino Hispanoamericano, staged by the organization in Seville.

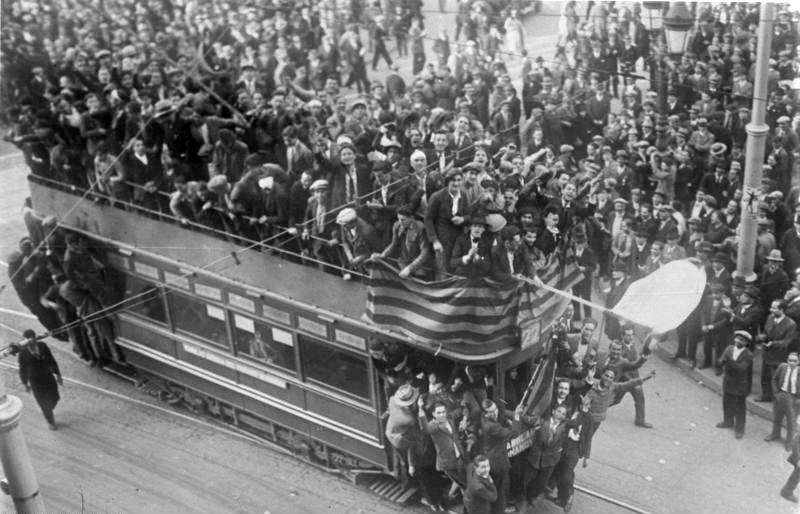
Republic declared, 1931

Urraca considered the fall of the monarchy a national disaster. Almost immediately she engaged in public rallies either in favor of the monarchy or protesting against militantly secular policy of the Republic. Already in May 1931 she was detained and fined 500 pesetas for promoting a meeting classified as non-constitutional conspiracy. She seemed politically disoriented; due to her earlier engagements she was considered sort of a socialist, ACM record made her look towards Christian organizations, in the April 1931 elections Urraca worked as propagandist supporting Alfonsine candidates and she neared José María Albiñana and his Legionarios. In late 1931 she co-organized Agrupación de Defensa Femenina, a conservative female organization grouping Alfonsine monarchists, Carlists and the Basque Emakumes, and was later asked to write the program draft. Extremely active, she helped to organize 50 meetings during four months. In 1932 she was fired as labor inspector.

== Carlist ==
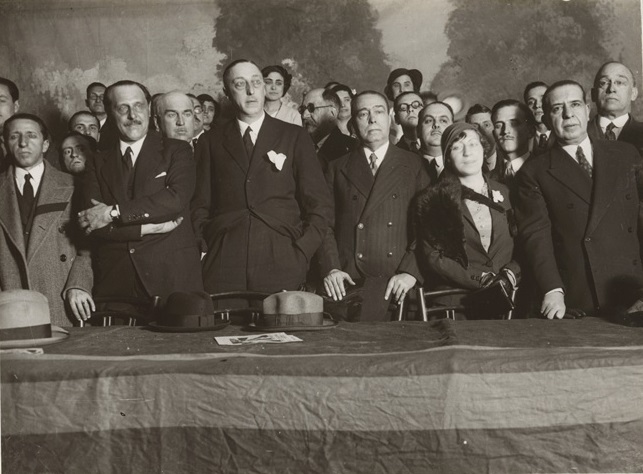
Urraca at Carlist rally, 1932

When detained, active in joint right-wing women groupings or collecting funds to pay fines, Urraca started to meet and forged closer relations with female Carlists; she was particularly impressed by María Ortega de Pradera. She later claimed having been fascinated by their unshaken Christianity, valiance and fortitude. During the winter of 1931-1932 she neared the Carlists, starting to appear on their public rallies and becoming sort of a rising star of the Carlist propaganda; her earlier combined experience in ACM, broadcasting, schools and newspapers turned her into a thrilling orator. Already in 1932 she was speaking at Carlist and Catholic meetings all over Spain, appearing among top Traditionalist politicians. Urraca contributed also to Carlist press, activity which triggered further fines. In 1933 she was already sort of a Carlist celebrity, acclaimed by their political leaders. and called omnipresent. She was noted by political opponents: Indalecio Prieto ridiculed her in the press stating that "the cavemen got their miss", to which the Carlist Requetés responded by greeting her with "Long Live Miss Cavemen" cry.

In the 1933 elections she ran for the Cortes from Gipuzkoa as Carlist representative in Unión Regionalista Gipuzcoana; greeted by the Republican press as „candidatura de la Edad Media, típicamente troglodita", she narrowly missed the election. Embittered by backstage political haggling Urraca was disillusioned by parliamentary politics; she went on with hectic propaganda activity across Spain, gaining nationwide recognition as an inflammatory and thrilling orator and greeted by homages from the Right and abuse from the Left. As Carlist leaders realized how important the female votes were she gained weight within the movement and entered correspondence with the Carlist queen, María de las Nieves.

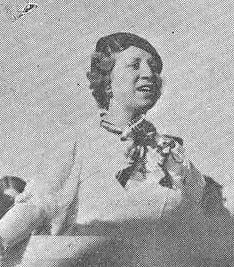
Urraca speaking, 1934

Following organizational shakeup of the party executive in 1934, the new leader Manuel Fal entrusted her with re-modeling the Secciones Femeninas of Comunión Tradicionalista. Female groupings, known as Margaritas, operated as affiliated with local circulos; apart from boosting membership and launching new activities, Urraca was entrusted with turning the organization from very loose federation into a nationwide structure; since the task has never been fully completed she did not assume formal presidency, though some scholars name her de facto leader. Up to 1936 Margaritas recruited 23,000 women, mostly in Valencia, Navarre and Vascongadas. Urraca encouraged them to take courses in nursing (and took it herself), getting ready to the anticipated violent overthrow of the Republic. In 1936 she unsuccessfully run for the parliament again, this time from Teruel. Urraca continued her favorite social activities setting up Socorro Blanco, the Carlist relief organization. In the movement's press she campaigned for Spiritual Crusade of Prayer. In April 1936 she was detained for illegal possession of a pistol but was smuggled out of custody and spent the last few months of peace hiding in a village of Arcos de la Llana near Burgos. Republican press claimed later that anti-republican conspirators appointed her the minister of industry and commerce in the future post-coup government, the information quoted as serious by a present-day historian.

== Civil war ==
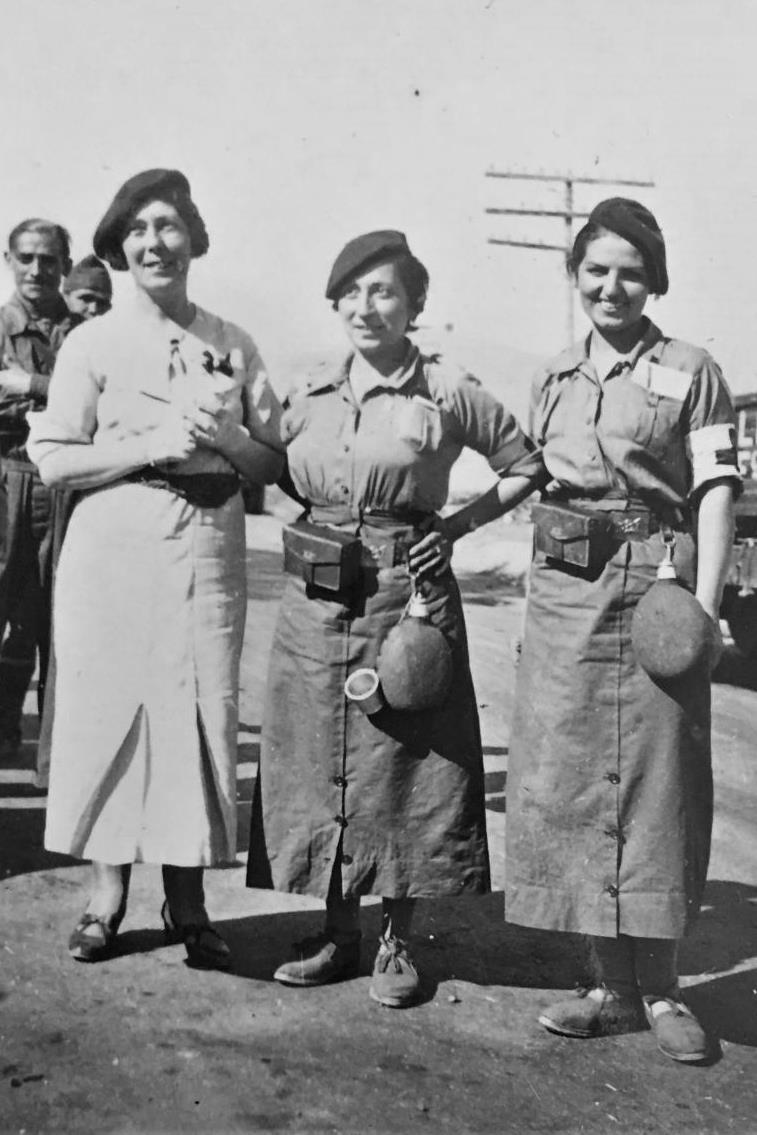
Urraca (middle), Guadarrama 1936

In Aranda de Duero Urraca joined the Navarrese troops commanded by García Escámez and heading for Madrid. On the intermittent basis she served as nurse on the Guadarrama front; during breaks she engaged in propaganda work and threw herself into organizing Carlist medical services, mostly recruiting women as nurses and auxiliary staff. November 1936 back in Guadarrama she spent Christmas among the soldiers, but moved – still as a nurse - to the Northern front in early 1937, partially present during the Nationalist conquest of Vascongadas. In immediate vicinity of the frontline Urraca made a picturesque figure; apart from typical medical activities she dispensed cognac at arbitrary doses to the wounded. According to some testimonies, she inflicted her Christian compassion upon the otherwise fanatical Carlist soldiers and prevented Nationalists from executing the Republican prisoners; she also publicly defended some captured Republicans accused of crimes. Other accounts point to her cruelty and suggest that she was co-responsible for Nationalist atrocities, especially for executions of Basque priests. She is also quoted writing that the orphaned Republican children should not be treated the same way as the Nationalist ones.

In late April called to Salamanca and received by Franco, she entered Sección Femenina of the newly created state party and along Pilar Primo de Rivera and Mercedes Sanz Bachiller became one of its leaders. Urraca assumed management of Delegación Nacional de Frentes y Hospitales, one of three branches of the Sección and entrusted with catering for the wounded. In FET she emerged as one of 3 Carlists among 14 heads of all Delegaciones. In October 1937 she was appointed - as one of 12 Carlists - to the newly established, 50-member Consejo Nacional, which triggered her expulsion from Comunión Tradicionalista. Engaged in organization and propaganda work, she kept visiting frontlines and was fêted along Nationalist heroes like Moscardó. Paradoxically, in the Republican media Urraca enjoyed no lesser popularity than in the Nationalist ones, mocked and ridiculed by the enemy press.

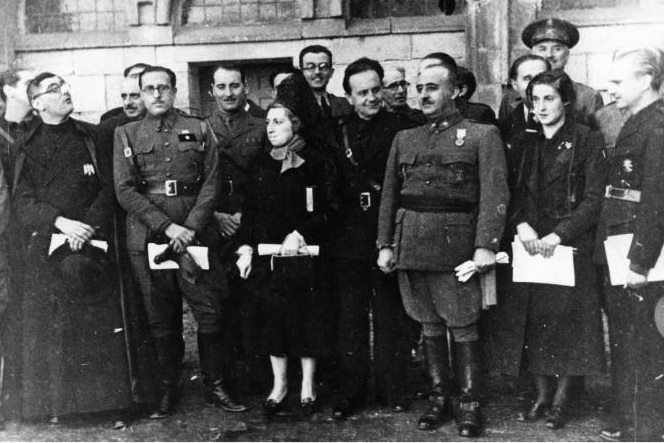
Urraca with Franco, Pilar Primo de Rivera and others, 1937 or 1938

In Sección Femenina Urraca clashed with Pilar Primo de Rivera. Apart from the rivalry of strong female personalities, the conflict was fuelled by ideological differences between the original Falange and the Comunión. Urraca tried to ensure autonomy of the Delegación against the Falange-dominated Sección. Uneasy relationship developed into open conflict already in 1937, going from bad to worse and culminating in showdown related to personal appointments of provincial Delegación leaders, badges designed for the service and creation of Cuerpo de Enfermeras. Primo de Rivera got the upper hand and Urraca resigned from leadership posts in Sección Femenina in July 1938, which in some areas led to massive departures of the Margaritas and the ultimate failure of amalgamating Margaritas into FET. Though in 1939 she was confirmed as member of the II. Consejo and awarded Cruz Roja del Mérito Militar, Urraca was not appointed to the III. Consejo in 1942 and dropped out of the FET executive, soon retiring to privacy and settling temporarily with her parents in Zaragoza.

== Privacy ==
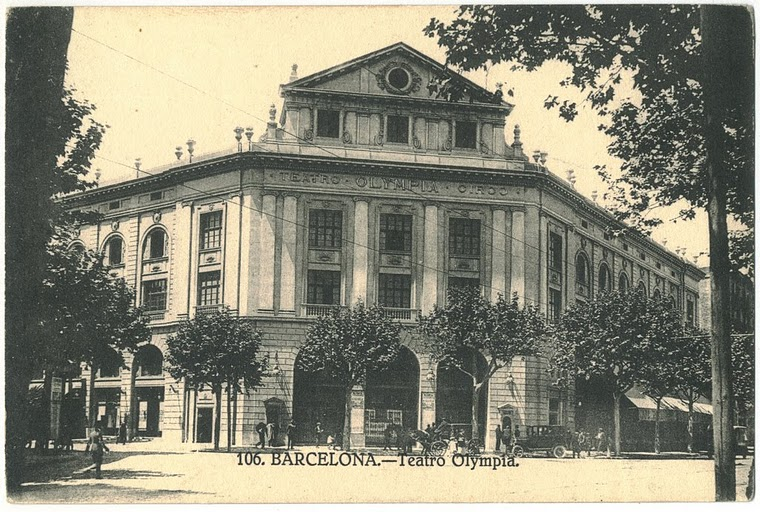
Teatro Olympia, Barcelona

When the civil war ended Urraca was only 39; her hectic activity of the past, abundant with a variety of initiatives and well portrayed in historiography, was to remain in sharp contrast with the next 45 years of her life, spent in privacy and ignored by historians: there is almost no scholarly information on her during that period. Her fate is compared to getting lost in "horror vacui", or disappearance in "tierra di nadie".

When in Zaragoza Urraca befriended María Pilar Ros Martínez; she was Catalan herself and persuaded Urraca to move together to Barcelona. In 1939 or 1940 Urraca settled with her parents in the Catalan capital. In the new setting she turned her home into a cultural circle. In the 1940s Urraca staged regular reunions at home; they were intended as artistic events, often with prestigious guests invited and covering music, painting and theatre. She did not resume teaching; in 1940 Urraca started to deliver public lectures. Advertised in the press as „charlas-recitales", they were intended as homages to patriotic virtues. Applauded in the newspapers as "ilustra charlista", she continued on commercial basis until the late 1940s, appearing also in Alava or Leon. The event, typically formatted as a semi-scholarly lecture, in her case was a theatrical monodrama, a genre of stage performance and actually delivered in places like Teatro Olympia.

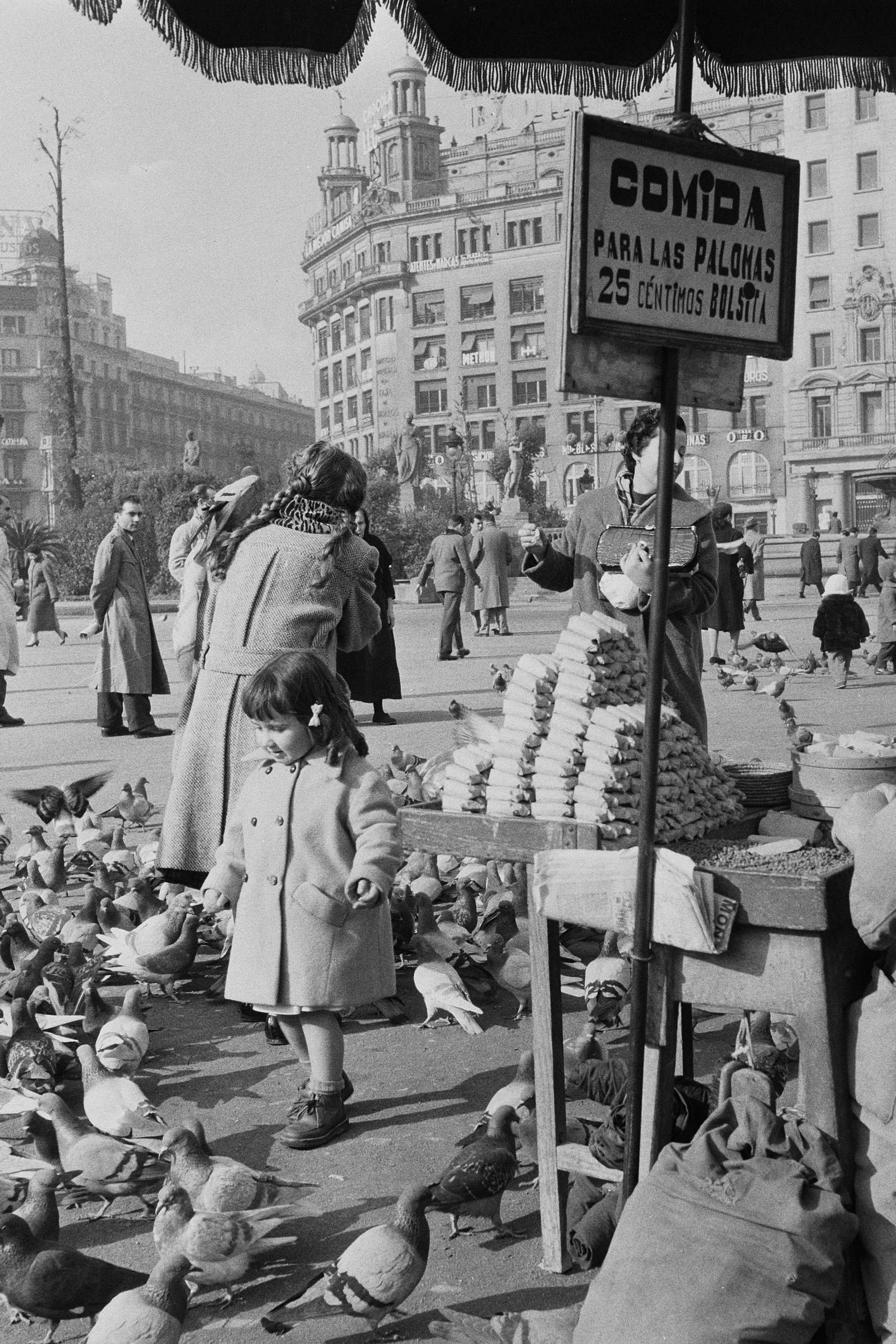
Barcelona, mid-1950s

In 1940 Urraca published wartime memoirs Así empezamos; the work contained homage references to Franco, but was designed as praise of males and especially females who contributed to the Nationalist war effort. The work steered clear of assailing the Republican opponents; it highlighted serenity of serving the cause of God and Spain. In Barcelona Urraca set up her own publishing house named MRUPSA, which in the 1940s co-issued two biographical books she had written and edited herself: one dedicated to Francis Borgia and another one to Lola Montes; she also published few books of other authors. The enterprise ceased to operate in the late 1940s. In 1949 a "Martina Urraca Pastor" was charged with fraud and sentenced to 6 years in prison; in 1950 she was additionally convicted to 3 years in prison for falsifying commercial documentation. It is not clear whether the person in question was María Rosa, whether the charges were related to her publishing business and whether there was any politics involved. Martina was pardoned respectively in 1951 and 1952.

As the family finances were sustained only by her father's military pension, in mid-1950s Urraca started to give lessons in oratory skills. Though initially she advertised also teaching castellano, later she dropped this feature from her press ads, which were appearing regularly in the local newspapers until the late 1960s; the last identified was published when she was 70 years old. Since the death of her father in 1965, having no close family Urraca was increasingly alienated, also by the changing lifestyle patterns of the Spanish society. She maintained particularly close relationship only with María Pilar Comín Ros, almost 20 years her junior and the Barcelona press pundit on women's fashion.

== Late public activity ==
Carlist standard

Upon termination of Urraca's term in the II. Consejo Nacional of Falange in 1942 she has almost entirely disappeared from politics, be it either this related to official Falangist structures, unofficial Carlist movement or semi-political Catholic organizations. In scholarly works on political life during Francoism she is almost absent, very few times appearing marginally in works dealing with post-war Carlism. Her public activity – apart from organizing reunions, delivering charlas and editorial work, all intended mostly to sustain ailing family finances – was mostly about engagement in local parochial and municipal Christian initiatives. She is noted as busy in apostolate of the lay, sort of going on with her earlier teaching work when running cursillos organized by España Cristiana, and maintaining interest in social issues by animating Catholic charity.

In the early 1940s Urraca was still noted as taking part in broad public Carlist initiatives. In 1942 she was among the distinguished guests present at the Montcada i Reixac cemetery, attending memorial service to the fallen requetés and led by the Catalan Carlist leader Maurici de Sivatte by the Mausoleum, erected 2 years earlier. None of the sources consulted refers to her engagement in Carlist political structures; some authors claim that the Carlists have never forgiven her the 1937-1942 engagement in Falange. It is not clear what stand – if any – she took when faced with fragmentation of Carlism, especially the Carloctavista breakup in the 1940s and the Sivattista secession in the 1950s. The official propaganda ignored her; her old-time rival, Pilar Primo de Rivera, made sure Urraca did not grow to prominence and the feminine model she advanced was not in line with masculine domination in public life, advanced by Francoism. She is noted, however, as taking part in various commemorative events organized by Catholic or social organizations. She also remained in touch with some personalities from both the Carlist and Republican camp.

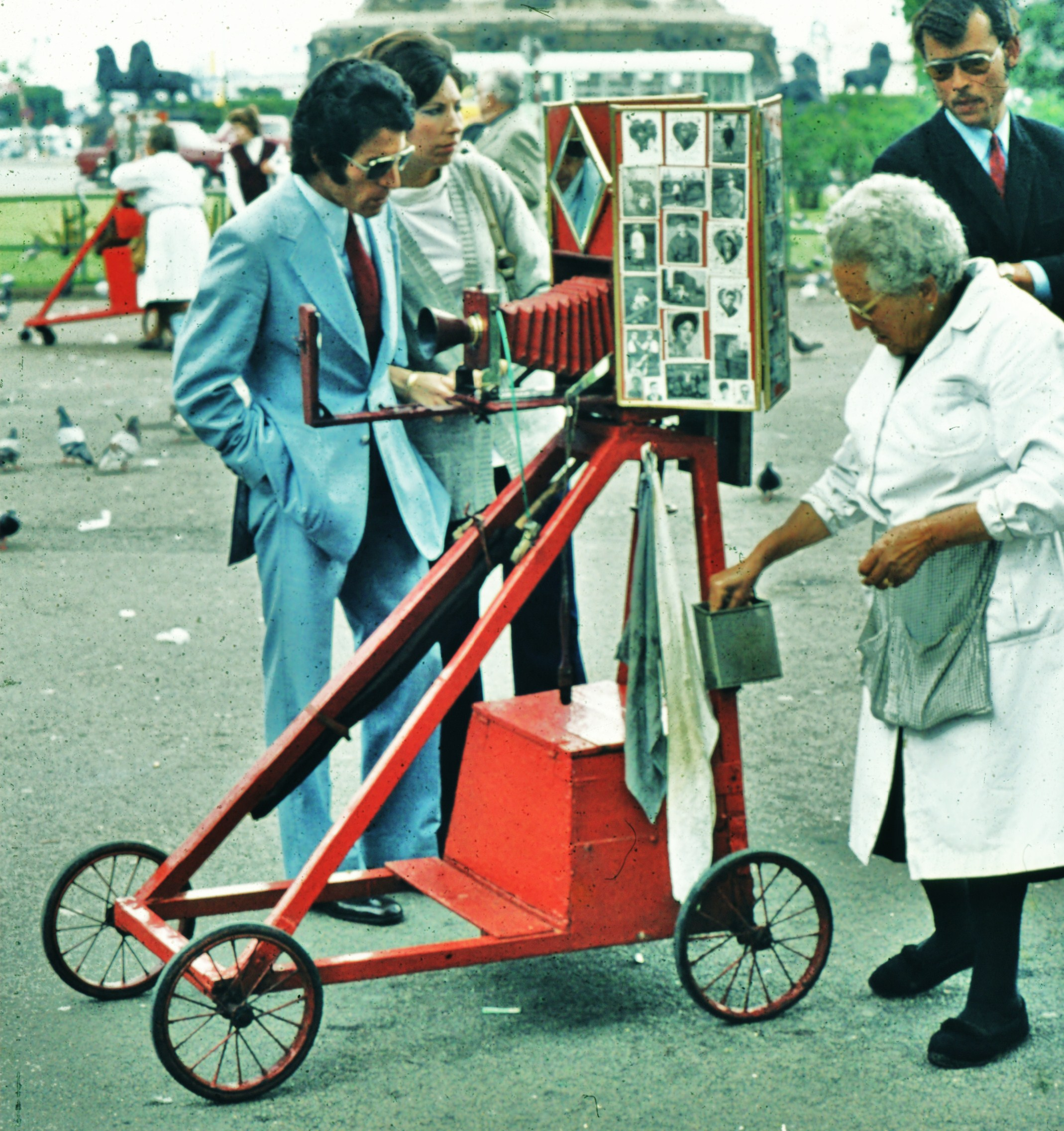
Barcelona, mid-1970s

Urraca increased her public profile by the end of her life, re-engaging in Carlism. As at that time the movement was torn between the Traditionalists and the socialists from Partido Carlista, she sided with the former; in 1972 she co-signed a document issued by Junta Nacional del Requeté, which lambasted Carlos Hugo as the one who abandoned the Carlist standard. Urraca remained engaged in anti-hugocarlista backlash also later on, her last voice on the issue was heard in 1974. Also during transición she took part in cultural events related to orthodox Carlism. In return, she was berated by the Partido Carlista propagandists as traitor and "enfermera de Franco". In the late 1970s she is known to have neared the post-Francoist búnker; in 1976 she lent her support to Blas Piñar and his Fuerza Nueva; in 1977, shortly before official dissolution of Movimiento Nacional, she still used to frequent its Barcelona premises, recorded as affable, restrained, but energetic and committed to her ideals. Until her death she considered herself a Carlist. In a letter sent to La Vanguardia in 1982, Urraca proudly confirmed her lifetime identity.

== Reception and legacy ==
In the 1930s hailed by the Right as electrifying orator and ridiculed by the Left as political troglodyte, after the Civil War Urraca has almost fallen into oblivion, save for three of her scarcely popular books. In the tightly censored media of the late 1940s an ex-Republican soldier turned graphics artist, Miguel Bernet Toledano, was permitted to create and publicize her malicious alter-ego known as Doña Urraca, a comics figure to become iconic character in the Spanish print. A direct reference has never been made; some claim the cartoon figure had nothing to do with Urraca Pastor, some maintain that there is little doubt the ugly black-dressed witch, keen to abuse the weak with a sole purpose to do evil was aimed to mock her. During transición she took the brunt of long-suppressed Republican anger; a wartime Francoist agent in France, an unrelated Pedro Urraca Rendueles, was presented as „Urraca Pastor" and there was even a 1979 theatric play featuring him as a villain involved in execution of Companys. Shortly before death she was mocked as a mustached nurse by the Nobel Prize winner José Cela in his Mazurca para dos muertos (1983); in literature she also appears - as bulky and ugly conspirator - in Inquietud en el Paraíso (2005) by Óscar Esquivias.

In historiography she is approached as a representative of various social phenomena rather than as a personality herself. One author considers Urraca a typical example of middle-class woman politicized by rocky times of the Second Republic. Another scholar advances a competitive thesis, namely that she engaged in public life mostly as a result of modernizing primoderiverista attempts combined with rising social activity of the Catholics. Some point to social issues as a key thread of her activity, some point to her traditional Catholicism and some focus on feminism. This approach is particularly popular, as Urraca is often mentioned when discussing growing role of women in the recent history of Spain. Though in the Basque realm she is held responsible for executions of priests, by many other scholars Urraca is viewed with cautious sympathy, as a person who was allegedly passionate about equality of the sexes, social justice, classless society and post-war reconciliation, a victim rather than a culprit.

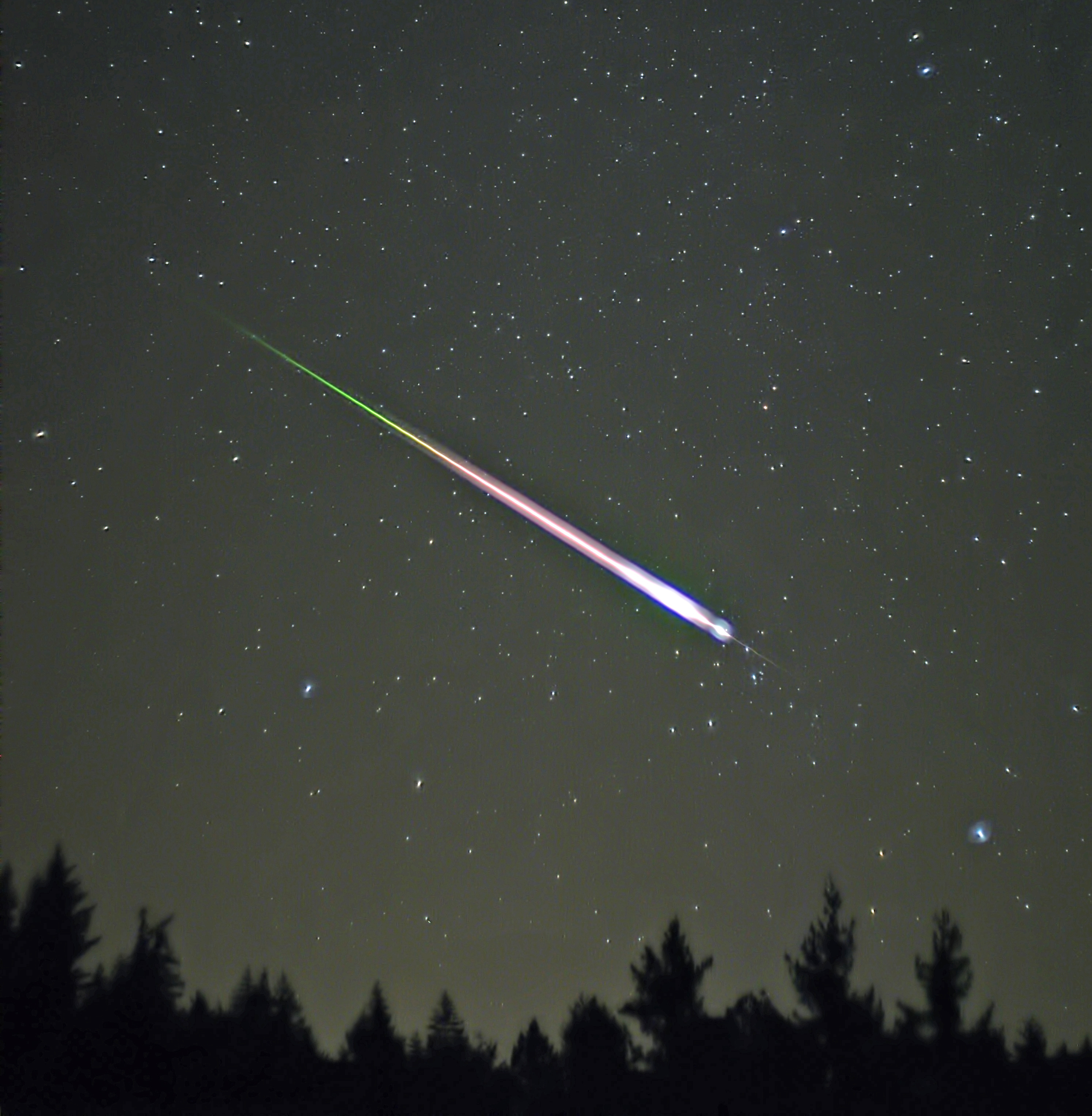
some compared Urraca to estrella fugaz

Except one early re-edition of Asi empezamos none of Urraca's books has been re-printed. In Carlist historiography she either tends to be ignored by Traditionalist writers or to be abused by Partido Carlista militants. Apart from a handful of related scholarly articles, she has earned one monograph so far, a master thesis in gender studies accepted at Universidad de Salamanca in 2012. A highly sympathetic, Carlism-flavored full-size biography was released in 2024. In a remote tiny Andalusian village of La Dehesa there is a street commemorating Urraca Pastor. An internet myth has it – information not confirmed by any scholarly work – that Urraca was responsible for Roman Catholic re-conversion of Dolores Ibarruri few years before death.

== See also ==
- Carlism
- Sección Femenina
- Second Spanish Republic
