= Electoral Carlism (Second Republic) =

Election history of Carlism

Carlist standard

In terms of electoral success Carlism of the Second Spanish Republic remained a medium-small political grouping, by far outperformed by large parties like PSOE and CEDA though trailing behind also medium-large contenders like Izquierda Republicana. During three electoral campaigns to the Cortes combined the Carlists seized less than 50 seats, which is below 3% of all seats available. Disorganized during the 1931 elections, the Carlist candidates were a first-choice political option for some 50,000 voters; following re-organization in successive campaigns the number grew to 420,000 (1933) and 365,000 (1936), respectively 4.9% and 3.8% of active electors. In the mid-1930s as a second-choice option the Carlists were acceptable candidates for some 1.8m voters (18%). The movement enjoyed support mostly in the Northern belt of Spain; the party stronghold was Navarre, the only region where Carlism remained a dominating force; it was a minority group still to be reckoned with in Vascongadas, Old Castile and Aragón, with rather testimonial presence in some other regions. The best known Carlist Cortes personality was Tomás Domínguez de Arévalo, who held the mandate during all three Republican terms.

== Background ==
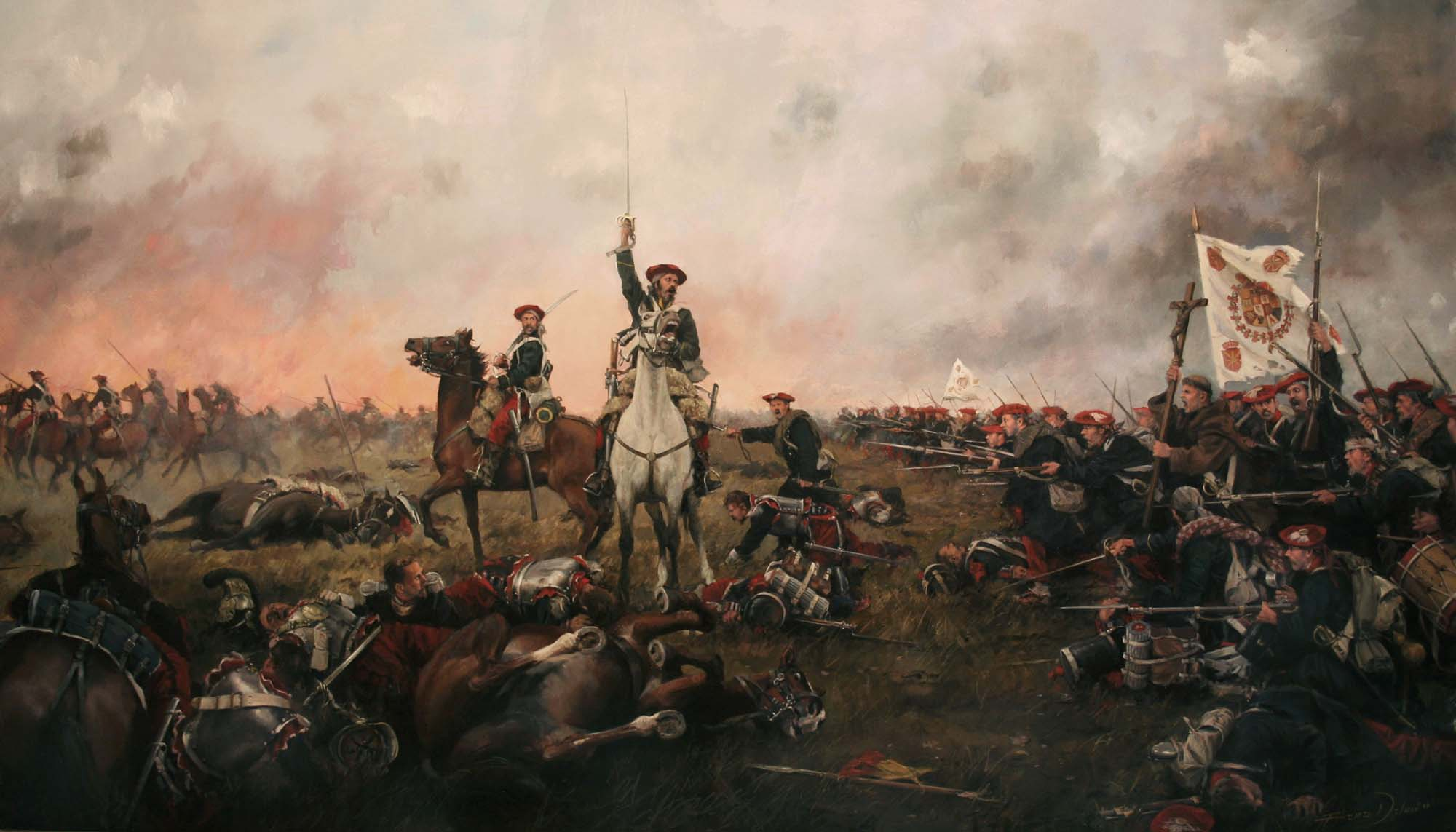
Exaltation of belligerent Carlism, painting by Augusto Ferrer-Dalmau

Carlism has been known for waging wars rather than for electoral efforts, and the principal Carlist tool when striving for political power has always been a rifle, not a ballot paper. When competing for parliamentary mandates the party calibrated its efforts as means of political mobilization and the way to maintain momentum before the next opportunity for a violent overthrow arises. This is how the Carlist contingent in the Cortes operated in the Isabelline period and during the Restoration era; usually reduced to a tiny group, only periodically it was growing to a sizeable yet still minoritarian parliamentary force. It was most numerous in the early 1870s, when 50 Carlist MPs made up 13% of the entire chamber; in the later Alfonsine monarchy era they were reduced to 1-4% of all deputies. The Carlist strategy and position in the parliamentarian realm of the Second Spanish Republic was not very much different; the Carlists viewed the republican system as a transitory regime to be toppled one way or another. They engaged in all three electoral campaigns to the Cortes, yet their efforts were formatted as means of political mobilization rather than as a path to power.

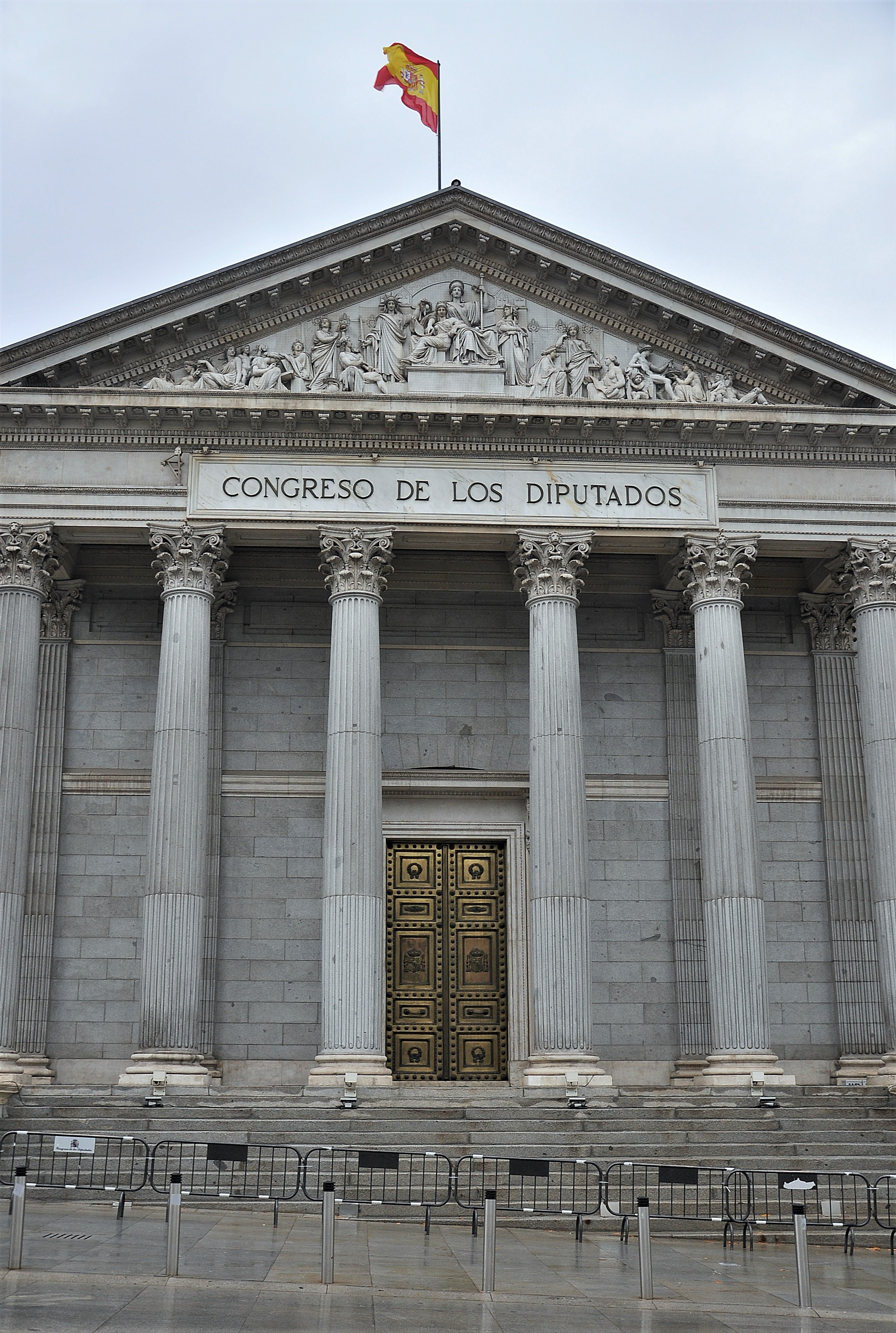
exterior of the Cortes building

In Spain of the early days of the Republic Carlism was generally considered "already dead, though not buried yet". The phrase expressed a popular belief that in the early 1930s the movement was nothing but an archaic relic of the Spanish past. Born hundred years earlier as epigone of feudalism, pathetically obsolete already in the late 19th century, it was supposedly delivered a mortal blow by the 1919 breakup. If there were still Carlist periodicals issued and some politicians active, it was – the theory went – only because a few old partisans of the cause refused to acknowledge the new times. After they died, Carlism was expected to be laid to rest on the ash heap of history; poor results of the 1931 elections seemed to confirm this view.

The years to come proved that with over 2m votes gained in each electoral campaign the movement demonstrated a revival. Scholars offer differing explanations of the phenomenon. According to one theory, sectarian republican milieu drove many voters to extremes, and Carlism as an extreme right-wing party was beneficiary of the process. According to another reading, in turbulent times Carlism has always thrived as an amalgamating force; in the 1830s it attracted absolutist defenders of the ancién regime, in the 1870s it attracted neocatólicos, in the 1930s it attracted all these anxious to prevent revolution. However, there were limits to Carlist appeal. As defenders of Catholic values they were outperformed by modern large Christian parties like CEDA. As advocates of the royal rule they struggled against the mainstream monarchist grouping, the Alfonsists. As campaigners for de-centralization and separate regional establishments they were no match for Basque and Catalan nationalists. A combination of the above features, plus issues related to electoral strategy, are deemed responsible for overall Carlist performance at the polls.

== Performance at the polls: Carlism and around ==
Overall Carlist performance
year	% of voters	% of seats
1931	1.2% (4.8%)	1.1%
1933	4.9% (17.7%)	5.1%
1936	3.8% (18.3%)	2.1%

Scholarly works provide various numbers of Carlist candidates and Carlist deputies between 1931 and 1936; depending upon a combination of sources, aggregate figures might range from 32 MPs to 50 MPs (2.3% to 3.5% of all seats available in 3 legislatives combined). In case of the 1931 campaign only 3 mandates are beyond doubt and the other 8 remain debated, which brings the share of mandates gained to a range between 0.6% and 2.3%. In case of the 1933 balloting the number of Carlist deputies listed by various authors ranges from 19 to 24 (4.0% to 5.1%) and in case of the 1936 elections the discrepancy is between 9 and 16 (2.1% to 3.5%). Regardless of the differences, the Carlist performance at the polls lagged far behind that demonstrated by the most successful parties, CEDA, PSOE and the Radicals, who in all three campaigns combined seized around 200 seats each; the Carlists were outperformed also by medium-large parties like Esquerra or various breeds of Republicanism, who between 1931 and 1936 won between 50 and 100 mandates each. The Carlists rank in the group of medium-small contenders claiming 25-50 seats each, like the Agrarians, Lliga, Renovación Española or PNV. In turn their score was above the results obtained by minor Republican parties, PCE, other workers’ organizations and various ephemeral groupings.

Differences in number of Carlist mandates reported result mostly from categorization issues, as a deputy in question might have been listed in one or another political rubric. By and large the question is about telling Traditionalism from Carlism. Some scholars discuss candidates related to various breeds of Traditionalism as Carlists, other students also group them together but ignore the Carlist denomination and prefer the Traditionalist heading, one more group of authors reserve the Traditionalist name for the Jaimistas only. In 1931 three Traditionalist branches, the Integristas, the Jaimistas and the Mellistas, were in transition, drawn together yet not formally re-united. The united Carlist organization which co-ordinated electoral efforts of 1933 and 1936, Comunión Tradicionalista (CT), formally took shape in early 1932. However also after that date the numbers are subject to doubt. Some hopefuls remained ambiguous in their party allegiances, while in 1936 Comisión de Actas cancelled few Carlist mandates; some scholars quote original results and some opt for these announced after the by-election.

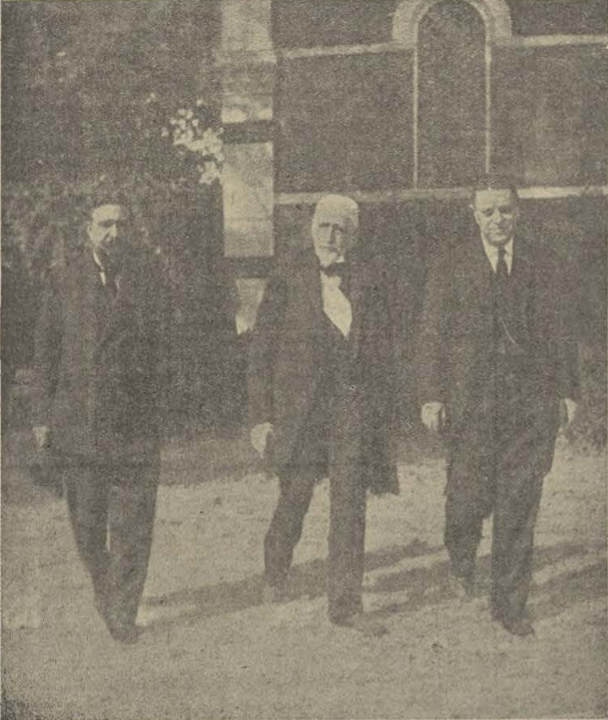
1931: Carlist leadership

Categorizing candidates and deputies in terms of their political identity is a major problem for historians of the Second Republic. Javier Tusell, a scholar expert in electoral history of the period, put forward a general proposal; it is based on analysis of political allegiances demonstrated by politicians in question afterwards. According to this methodology, only the candidates who later joined the Carlist Cortes minority or engaged in CT would qualify as Carlists. Others scholars ignore the proposal and apply their own criteria, e.g. when claiming that since 1931 the parliamentarian "minoria carlista" was divided into 2 formal factions, católico-fueristas and agrarios; some consider Tusell's approach anachronistic and useless when gauging electoral support for specific parties.

== Program and alliances ==
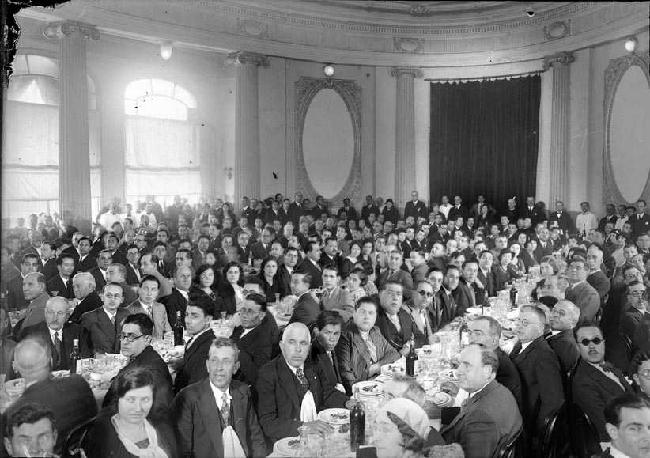
Carlist meeting, 1932

Two threads marking the general tone of all Carlist electoral campaigns were defense of Catholicism, perceived as endangered by militantly secular republican legislation, and countering the revolution, reportedly advanced by parties of the Left. In 1931 another major thread was promotion of the fueros, though the feature was sidelined and marginalized later on. As the republican regime demonstrated extreme vigilance towards all monarchist references, in Carlist propaganda they appeared rather veiled, though there were exceptions. Dynastic overtones were also somewhat muted; in case Don Jaime or later Don Alfonso Carlos was mentioned, he appeared as "nuestro augusto caudillo". Other motives, repeatedly featured during Carlist electoral meetings, were exaltation of Patria and patriotism, protection of traditional values, especially the family, and defense of law and order, including private property. Remarks tackling social issues were rare, either maintained within the framework of Christian solidarity or calibrated as buttressing agrarian interests. The traditional Carlist negative point of reference, Liberalism, was gradually giving way to Marxism in both its Socialist and Communist incarnations; occasionally anti-Masonic and anti-Jewish motives surfaced in Traditionalist electoral discourse.

General and vaguely specified objectives of Carlist candidates in theory seemed to facilitate their access to many Right-wing coalitions; however, in practice the party tended to rigidity when discussing would-be alliances with potentially akin political groupings. The champion of Catholic rights, CEDA, was approached by the Carlists with suspicion due to its Christian-Democratic format of religiosity and the accidentalist political outlook. Another monarchist grouping, Renovación Española, generated even more mistrust because of its strongly Alfonsist leaning. The parties standing for regional regulations, the Basque PNV or the Catalan La Lliga, provoked skepticism about perceived support for separatist nationalisms and dubious Spanish loyalty. Perhaps the party which turned the most likely Carlist alliance partner was Partido Agrario, a conservative grouping of landowners and small-to-medium farmers; candidates of both organizations particularly frequently appeared on common election lists, some posed as representing both parties and some Agrarians were indeed officially backed by the Carlists.

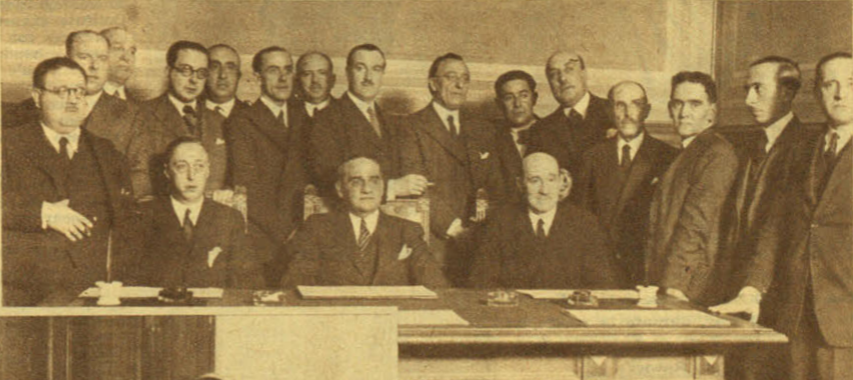
1933: sitting of TYRE (Tradicionalistas y Renovación Española), a monarchist electoral co-ordination bureau

The party remained divided over its alliance policy, most inclined towards coalition deals during leadership of Rodezno (mid-1932 to mid-1934). The result was that the Carlists have never signed a fully-fledged nationwide pact with another party. Twice they concluded electoral deals nearing such an alliance. Prior to the 1931 campaign the Carlists formed a joint "católico-fuerista" list with PNV, though it was limited to Vascongadas and Navarre only. Prior to the 1933 campaign they joined Renovacion Española in TYRE, an electoral co-ordination bureau; half-heartedly supported, the initiative was barely revived in 1936. The result was that in 1933 and 1936 all cases of Carlists joining multi-party lists were agreed on provincial level; except Navarre, the Carlists were always a minority partner. If talks failed a Carlist candidate ran on his own, usually unsuccessfully. Dislike of inter-party bargaining, demonstrated particularly in 1936, translated into electoral results. In 1933 and 1936 all party candidates combined gathered some 2.1m votes in each campaign; in 1933 the candidates supported obtained 24 mandates, while in 1936 the result was merely 10 seats.

== Electorate ==
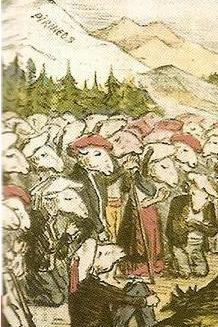
Carlist electorate (older Liberal cartoon)

The Republican electoral system strongly encouraged coalitions and voters tended to block-vote all candidates from a specific electoral list; the result is that according to expert historians, the size of particular party electorate is impossible to be defined exactly. The simplest estimate of general Carlist electoral support is based on aggregating all votes obtained by candidates identified as Carlists; in 1931 this total was 0.27m votes (0.45m in case also disputed candidates are counted in), in 1933 it neared 2.11m and in 1936 it stood at 2.21m votes. Apart from the fact that due to different legislation the numbers from 1931 and from 1933/36 are not comparable and that there is some de-duplication needed, the aggregates by no means indicate how many voters preferred Carlism as their first-choice political option. Since every voter was entitled to choose a number of candidates, the figures might at best demonstrate that in the mid-1930s some 1,8 million Spaniards above 23 years of age (13% of the electorate and 18% of active voters) were prepared to support a Carlist candidate, either as a first-choice option or as an acceptable alliance partner.

Though dividing the entire Spanish electorate by strict party allegiances seems impossible on basis of electoral results only, historians devised workarounds intended to arrive at least at some estimates. One method is based on calculating "proporción de decisiones" (PdD), another one focuses on calculating so-called "media de votos" (MdV); in most circumstances PdD and MdV methods return quite similar results. Since one component of the PdD method is available for 1931 only, the MdV method is followed to calculate figures for 1933 and 1936 campaigns. The number of voters who preferred Carlism as their first-choice political option is hence estimated at 51,000 people in 1931 (99,000 in case also dubious candidates are counted in), 422,000 people in 1933 and 366,000 people in 1936. In relative terms these figures amounted to 1.2% of all active voters in 1931 (0.8% of all those entitled to vote), 4.9% in 1933 (3.3%) and 3.8% in 1936 (2.7%). As there were probably some Carlist voters in districts with no Carlist candidate running the above figures should be understood as the lowest acceptable estimates, yet any substantial revision upwards does not seem likely.

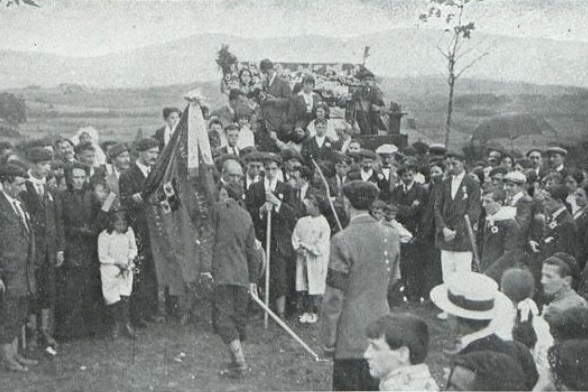
Rural Carlist feast

None of the works consulted attempts to define a social profile of the Carlist electorate, be it in terms of sex, age, education, occupation, residence or any other feature. Some approximation is offered by electoral studies dedicated to specific areas – not necessarily representative for the entire Spain – and by works providing social analysis of Carlism at the outbreak of the Civil War. Both types of analysis suggest that Carlism was generally a heterogeneous, inter-class movement; some scholars claim that it was "el movimiento de derechas más interclasista de Epaña". However, it enjoyed popular particularly in rural milieu of small towns and villages rather than in major urban centers; only 3 mandates were obtained by the Carlists in a strictly urban constituency of a large city. Many scholars note also that implantation of Carlism was not equal in all rural areas; it was small- and mid-size farmers rather than landless rural proletariat who were particularly attracted.

== Geography ==
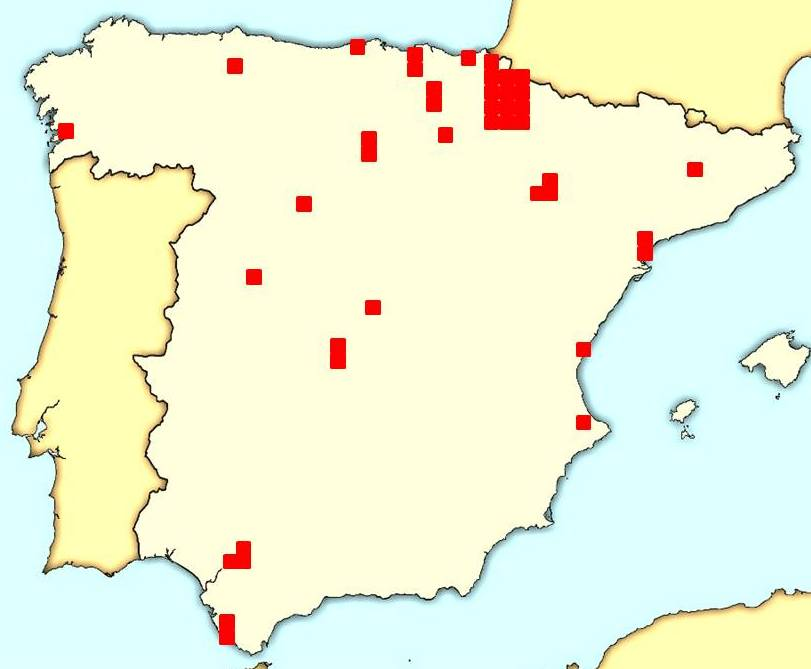
Geography of Carlist deputies

Carlism was not a genuinely nationwide grouping; its so-called Mass Party Index, a parameter devised to gauge capacity to compete in all electoral districts, ranged from meager 20% (1931) to 48% (1933) and 43% (1936). Measured in terms of the number of mandates won, geographical support for Carlism during the Republican period remained uneven; some two thirds of seats were obtained in the Northern half of the country. However, the result was far more balanced than in the Restoration period, when no seat was won South of Sierra de Guadarrama; in the 1930s the party recorded some modest revival in New Castile and Andalusia. Under the democratic regime of 1876-1923 the three Carlist strongholds, Catalonia, Navarre and Vascongadas, provided 81% of all seats gained; in 1931-1936 the three regions were responsible for only 46% of Carlist seats. Navarre clearly remained the Carlist nucleus and ensured 26% of all seats gained; however, the party reduced its dependence on the province from 35% during the Restoration era. The Carlist centre of gravity moved away particularly from Vascongadas and Catalonia; the former ensured only 13% of seats compared to 30% during the Alfonsine monarchy; for Catalonia the number was 8% compared to 16%.

most Carlist regions (% of seats won)
no	district	1931	1933	1936	total
1	Navarre	28.6%	57.1%	57.1%	47.6%
2	Vascongadas	11.8%	11.8%	5.9%	9.8%
3	Aragon	0.0%	9.5%	4.8%	4.8%
4	Old Castile	0.0%	9.8%	2.4%	4.1%
5	Asturias	0.0%	6.3%	0.0%	2.1%
6	Catalonia	0.0%	3.8%	1.9%	1.9%
7	Andalusia	0.0%	4.5%	1.1%	1.9%
8	Valencia	0.0%	5.4%	0.0%	1.8%
9	New Castile	1.6%	1.6%	1.6%	1.6%
10	Leon	0.0%	4.5%	0.0%	1.5%
11	Galicia	0.0%	2.1%	0.0%	0.7%
12	Baleares	0.0%	0.0%	0.0%	0.0%
12	Canarias	0.0%	0.0%	0.0%	0.0%
12	Extremadura	0.0%	0.0%	0.0%	0.0%
12	Murcia	0.0%	0.0%	0.0%	0.0%
	SPAIN	1.1%	5.1%	2.1%	2.8%

In terms of support measured as the number of seats gained compared to the number of seats available, the region which remained a Carlist stronghold was Navarre, where the party seized 48% of all seats contested in 1931–1936. In three regions electoral Carlism remained a secondary force still to be reckoned with: Vascongadas (10% of all seats available), Old Castile (5%) and Aragón (5%). In 6 regions electoral presence of the party was merely testimonial, the ratio of mandates won ranging from 1,5% to 2%: Andalusia, Asturias, Catalonia, León, New Castile and Valencia. Compared to the Alfonsine period the Carlist success ratio deteriorated visibly though not dramatically across most of the country, detrimental especially in former bulwarks of Vascongadas and Catalonia. However, there were exceptions; in Navarre the Carlist share of seats gained rose from 36% in the Restoration period, with relative growth also in Old Castile and regions where the party failed to obtain a single seat prior to 1923. Application of MdV method to calculate Carlist share of votes (not seats) across regions suggests that it ranged from some 40% in Navarre to 15-17% in the Vascongadas, 3-7% in Old Castile, 2-6% in Valencia, 4-5% in Aragón and Catalonia and 2-4% in Andalusia, León and New Castile.

Because single-mandate smaller electoral districts of the Restoration period were replaced with multi-mandate larger districts of the Republic no detailed geographic comparison is possible. On provincial level – the lowest one available – the entities which recorded the highest Carlist success ratio were Navarre (48%), Álava (33%), Tarragona (10%) and Zaragoza (aldea, 9%); the most striking change was recorded in Gipuzkoa, where prior to 1923 the Carlists grabbed 33% of all seats available; in 1931-1936 this ratio fell to 6%. Also other provinces with traditionally noticeable Carlist support, especially these on the Mediterranean coast, turned increasingly lukewarm in their Carlist preferences; these were the Catalan cases of Girona and Barcelona.

== Personalities ==
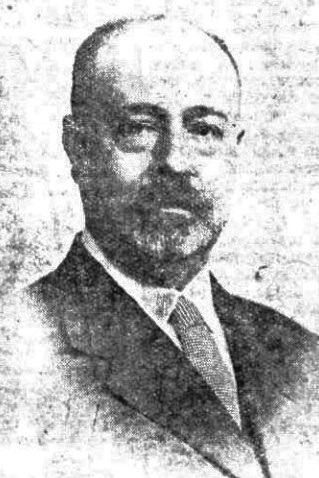
3 x failed: Larramendi

There were 65 individuals who represented Carlism competing for the Republican Cortes tickets; out of these, 30 were successful. One person, Tómas Domínguez de Arévalo or conde de Rodezno, won the mandate in all 3 campaigns, while 5 Carlist politicians sat in the chamber during 2 terms: Luis Arellano Dihinx, Joaquín Bau Nolla, Jesús Comín Sagüés, Gínez Martínez Rubio and José Luis Oriol Uriguen. However, none of the Carlist MPs gained esteem comparable to this enjoyed by such Right-wing parliamentary tycoons like José Calvo Sotelo or José María Gil-Robles. Though there were Carlist politicians recognized for their intellectual format, some – like Víctor Pradera – did not aspire to the Cortes mandate, and some – like Luis Hernando de Larramendi – failed in their bids. The figure of Larramendi stands out for another reason – he was the sole Carlist candidate who ran in 1931, 1933 and 1936 and who lost in all 3 campaigns.

Detailed profiling of all Carlist candidates is not possible due to data shortages, perhaps except noting that they were 64 males and 1 female. The MP contingent was made mostly of lawyers, landowners and entrepreneurs; 13 were in their 30s, 12 in their 40s, 10 in their 50s and few individuals remained either below 30 or above 60. Among the Carlist deputies 5 gained parliamentary practice in the Restoration Cortes; the most experienced of them, Esteban Bilbao, served three terms prior to 1923. His record pales in comparison with this of Manuel Senante, who served 8 terms as the Integrist deputy during the Restoration period; however, Senante failed in his two Republican parliamentarian bids. The MP who eventually rose to highest honors was Bilbao, in the Francoist Spain the minister of justice and the longtime president of the Cortes; on the other end, 6 Carlist MPs were later killed by their political opponents.

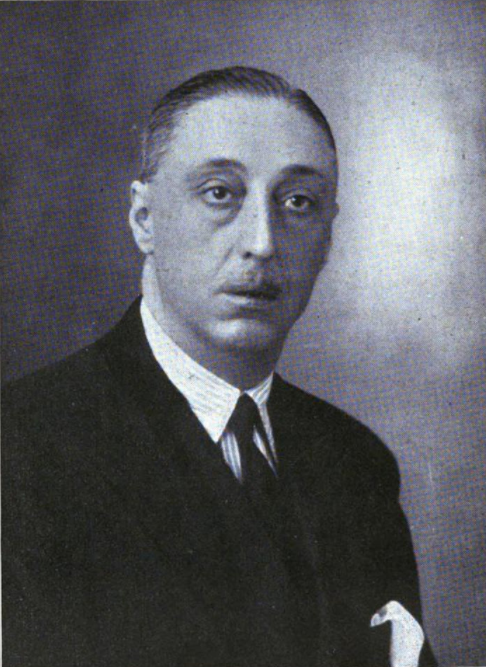
3 x elected: Rodezno

It might look paradoxical that out of 10 candidates who gathered the largest number of votes 7 failed; the phenomenon resulted from their standing in large urban constituencies, usually at best lukewarm towards Carlism, and its key victim was Roman Oyarzun; in Madrid in 1936 he was supported by 186.000 voters. In terms of the largest share of votes gathered the best performing Carlist candidate was Miguel de Miranda y Mateo, who in Logroño in 1933 was supported by 87% of active voters. The worst recorded result was this of Francisco Martínez García, who in Murcia in 1936 gathered 1.469 votes only; similarly disastrous appears to be the result of José Roca y Ponsa in the Canarias in 1931, yet his 735 votes were gathered under the legislation which allowed only male suffrage. The post of Carlist political leader, jefe delegado, was held by 3 individuals; in 1931 marqués de Villores ran on his own in Valencia and lost miserably, in 1933 conde de Rodezno won comfortably in Navarre, and in 1936 Fal Conde, who unsuccessfully tried his luck as Integrist in 1931, refrained from fielding his candidature. During the 1931–1933 term there was no formal Carlist minority, yet the Catholic-Fuerista bloc they formed part of was headed by Joaquin Beunza; during the 1933–1935 term and the term which commenced in 1936 it was Conde de Rodezno who formally headed the Carlist Cortes parliamentary group.

== Appendix. Carlist candidates, 1931–1936 ==
year	name	district	region	votes	MdV	result
1933	ORIOL Y URIGUEN, JOSE LUIS DE	ALAVA	VASCONGADAS	20718	20718	ELECTED
1936	ORIOL Y URIGUEN, JOSE LUIS DE	ALAVA	VASCONGADAS	16020	16020	ELECTED
1933	SENANTE MARTINEZ, MANUEL	ALICANTE	VALENCIA	40015	5002	FAILED
1936	SENANTE MARTINEZ, MANUEL	ALICANTE	VALENCIA	9926	9926	FAILED
1936	RADA PERAL, RICARDO	ALMERIA	ANDALUSIA	49623	9925	FAILED
1933	QUINT ZAFORTEZA, JOSE	BALEARES	BALEARES	9485	1897	FAILED
1931	GAMBUS RUSCA, FRANCISCO	BARCELONA (C)	CATALONIA	24131	1724	FAILED
1936	GOMIS CORNET, JOAQUIN	BARCELONA (C)	CATALONIA	151018	9439	FAILED
1936	PRAT PIERA, JOSE	BARCELONA (P)	CATALONIA	144670	13152	FAILED
1931	SOLER JANER, JUAN	BARCELONA (P)	CATALONIA	3500	292	FAILED
1933	SOLER JANER, JUAN	BARCELONA (P)	CATALONIA	64000	5333	FAILED
1933	TRAVERIA PUBILL, JUAN	BARCELONA (P)	CATALONIA	63000	5250	FAILED
1931	OREJA ELOSEGUI, MARCELINO	BISCAY (C)	VASCONGADAS	15982	3996	ELECTED
1936	JUARISTI LANDAIDA, JOSE MARIA	BISCAY (C)	VASCONGADAS	30027	7507	FAILED
1933	LEZAMA LEGUIZAMON, LUIS	BISCAY (C)	VASCONGADAS	18498	4625	FAILED
1936	GAYTAN DE AYALA Y COSTA, JOSE LUIS	BISCAY (P)	VASCONGADAS	24726	12363	FAILED
1933	OREJA ELOSEGUI, MARCELINO	BISCAY (P)	VASCONGADAS	20259	10130	ELECTED
1933	ROJO BARONA, HERMOGENES	BISCAY (C)	VASCONGADAS	18834	9417	FAILED
1936	ESTEVANEZ RODRIGUEZ, FRANCISCO	BURGOS	OLD CASTILE	66324	13265	FAILED
1933	ESTEVANEZ RODRIGUEZ, FRANCISCO	BURGOS	OLD CASTILE	68037	11340	ELECTED
1933	GOMEZ ROJI, RICARDO	BURGOS	OLD CASTILE	18891	3149	FAILED
1936	VALIENTE SORIANO, JOSE MARIA	BURGOS	OLD CASTILE	94986	12997	ELECTED
1933	MARTINEZ DE PINILLOS SAENZ, MIGUEL	CADIZ	ANDALUSIA	47299	5912	ELECTED
1936	PALOMINO JIMENEZ, JUAN JOSE	CADIZ	ANDALUSIA	58082	7260	FAILED
1933	PALOMINO JIMENEZ, JUAN JOSE	CADIZ	ANDALUSIA	46362	5795	ELECTED
1931	CHICHARRO SANCHEZ GUIO, JAIME	CASTELLON	VALENCIA	10867	2717	FAILED
1933	CHICHARRO SANCHEZ GUIO, JAIME	CASTELLON	VALENCIA	49479	12370	FAILED
1933	GRANELL PASCUAL, JUAN	CASTELLON	VALENCIA	56199	14050	ELECTED
1936	SOLER MARTI, JUAN BAUTISTA	CASTELLON	VALENCIA	11955	5987	FAILED
1933	ARAUZ DE ROBLES, JOSE MARIA	GERONA	CATALONIA	4747	949	FAILED
1936	HERNANDO DE LARRAMENDI, LUIS	GERONA	CATALONIA	59302	11860	FAILED
1933	LLANAS DE NIUBO, RENE	GERONA	CATALONIA	4558	912	FAILED
1936	MUGICA MUGICA JOSE	GIPUZKOA	VASCONGADAS	44549	11137	FAILED
1936	OREJA ELOSEGUI, RICARDO	GIPUZKOA	VASCONGADAS	44845	12211	FAILED
1933	PAGOAGA Y PAGOAGA, ANTONIO	GIPUZKOA	VASCONGADAS	32055	8014	FAILED
1936	PAGOAGA Y PAGOAGA, ANTONIO	GIPUZKOA	VASCONGADAS	44711	11178	FAILED
1933	TELLERIA MENDIZABAL, AGUSTIN	GIPUZKOA	VASCONGADAS	31708	7927	FAILED
1931	URQUIJO IBARRA, JULIO	GIPUZKOA	VASCONGADAS	35819	8955	ELECTED
1933	URRACA PASTOR, MARIA ROSA	GIPUZKOA	VASCONGADAS	31618	7904	FAILED
1936	ARAUZ DE ROBLES, JOSE MARIA	GRANADA	ANDALUSIA	145934	14593	FAILED
1936	GARZON MARIN, ANTONIO	JAEN	ANDALUSIA	131506	13151	FAILED
1933	DIAZ AGUADO Y SALABERRY, RAFAEL	LA CORUNA	GALICIA	16006	1334	FAILED
1936	SANGENIS BERTRAND, CASIMIRO DE	LERIDA	CATALONIA	57889	14472	FAILED
1933	SANGENIS BERTRAND, CASIMIRO DE	LERIDA	CATALONIA	51869	12967	ELECTED
1933	MIRANDA Y MATEO, MIGUEL DE	LOGRONO	OLD CASTILE	37456	12485	ELECTED
1936	TOLEDO Y ROBLES, ROMUALDO DE	LOGRONO	OLD CASTILE	9942	9942	FAILED
1931	HERNANDO DE LARRAMENDI, LUIS	MADRID (C)	NEW CASTILE	7521	2507	FAILED
1933	HERNANDO DE LARRAMENDI, LUIS	MADRID (C)	NEW CASTILE	130594	43531	FAILED
1936	OYARZUN OYARZUN, ROMAN	MADRID (C)	NEW CASTILE	185266	14251	FAILED
1933	TOLEDO Y ROBLES, ROMUALDO DE	MADRID (P)	NEW CASTILE	71486	10212	ELECTED
1933	HINOJOSA LASARTE, JOSE MARIA	MALAGA (P)	ANDALUSIA	34711	4959	FAILED
1936	HINOJOSA LASARTE, JOSE MARIA	MALAGA (P)	ANDALUSIA	46478	7746	FAILED
1936	MARTINEZ GARCIA, FRANCISCO	MURCIA	MURCIA	2052	2052	FAILED
1936	ARELLANO DIHINX, LUIS	PAMPLONA	NAVARRA	78861	11266	ELECTED
1936	DOMINGUEZ AREVALO, TOMAS	PAMPLONA	NAVARRA	81770	11681	ELECTED
1936	ELIZALDE Y SAINZ DE ROBLES, JESUS	PAMPLONA	NAVARRA	78159	11166	ELECTED
1936	MARTINEZ DE MORENTIN, FRANCISCO JAVIER	PAMPLONA	NAVARRA	79224	11318	ELECTED
1933	ARELLANO DIHINX, LUIS	PAMPLONA	NAVARRA	72377	14475	ELECTED
1931	BEUNZA Y REDIN, JOAQUIN	PAMPLONA	NAVARRA	46102	9220	ELECTED
1933	BILBAO Y EGUIA, ESTEBAN	PAMPLONA	NAVARRA	77714	15543	ELECTED
1931	DOMINGUEZ AREVALO, TOMAS	PAMPLONA	NAVARRA	45940	9188	ELECTED
1933	DOMINGUEZ AREVALO, TOMAS	PAMPLONA	NAVARRA	89901	17980	ELECTED
1933	MARTINEZ DE MORENTIN, FRANCISCO JAVIER	PAMPLONA	NAVARRA	79487	15897	ELECTED
1936	DELAGE SANTOS, RAMON	ORENSE	GALICIA	25357	3622	FAILED
1933	MERAS NAVIA OSORIO, GONZALO	OVIEDO	ASTURIAS	124645	10387	ELECTED
1933	LIS QUIVEN, VICTOR	PONTEVEDRA	GALICIA	67111	7457	ELECTED
1936	LAMAMIE DE CLAIRAC, JOSE MARIA	SALAMANCA	LEON	64906	10818	FAILED
1933	LAMAMIE DE CLAIRAC, JOSE MARIA	SALAMANCA	LEON	78020	15604	ELECTED
1933	ZAMANILLO Y GONZALEZ-CAMINO, JOSE LUIS	SANTANDER	OLD CASTILE	68950	13790	ELECTED
1936	ZAMANILLO Y GONZALEZ-CAMINO, JOSE LUIS	SANTANDER	OLD CASTILE	11735	11735	FAILED
1936	MARTINEZ RUBIO, GINES	SEVILLA (C)	ANDALUSIA	43091	10773	ELECTED
1933	DIAZ CUSTODIO, JUAN	SEVILLA (P)	ANDALUSIA	26150	3269	FAILED
1933	MARTINEZ RUBIO, GINES	SEVILLA (C)	ANDALUSIA	37155	9289	ELECTED
1933	TEJERA DE QUESADA, DOMINGO	SEVILLA (P)	ANDALUSIA	42798	5350	ELECTED
1933	BAU NOLLA, JOAQUIN	TARRAGONA	CATALONIA	59755	11951	ELECTED
1936	BAU NOLLA, JOAQUIN	TARRAGONA	CATALONIA	69405	13881	ELECTED
1931	ROCA CABALL, JUAN BAUTISTA	TARRAGONA	CATALONIA	10315	2063	FAILED
1936	URRACA PASTOR, MARIA ROSA	TERUEL	ARAGON	22478	5620	FAILED
1931	MADARIAGA ALMENDROS, DIMAS	TOLEDO	NEW CASTILE	31576	3947	ELECTED
1936	REQUEJO SAN ROMAN, JESUS	TOLEDO	NEW CASTILE	125513	15589	ELECTED
1933	MANGLANO Y CUCALO, JOAQUIN	VALENCIA (C)	VALENCIA	54767	10953	ELECTED
1931	SELVA MERGELINA, JOSE DE	VALENCIA (C)	VALENCIA	13172	2634	FAILED
1931	DIAZ AGUADO Y SALABERRY, RAFAEL	VALENCIA (P)	VALENCIA	11357	1136	FAILED
1933	LINARES ARINO, CARLOS	VALENCIA (P)	VALENCIA	87725	8773	FAILED
1936	PUIGDOLLERS OLIVER, MARIANO	VALENCIA (P)	VALENCIA	126414	12641	FAILED
1933	CALZADA RODRIGUEZ, LUCIANO DE LA	VALLADOLID	OLD CASTILE	64358	16090	ELECTED
1931	ROCA PONSA, JOSE	LAS PALMAS	CANARIAS	735	735	FAILED
1933	COMIN SAGUES, JESUS	ZARAGOZA (P)	ARAGON	54125	10825	ELECTED
1936	COMIN SAGUES, JESUS	ZARAGOZA (P)	ARAGON	70462	14092	ELECTED
1933	RAMIREZ SINUES, JAVIER	ZARAGOZA (P)	ARAGON	54819	10964	ELECTED

== See also ==
- Carlism
- Traditionalism (Spain)
- Electoral Carlism (Restoration)
- Carlo-francoism
