= Pelayos (organization) =

Carlist paramilitary

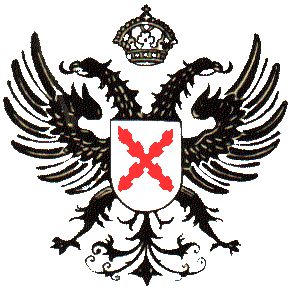
- Logo of Pelayos
- Founded: 1930s
- Ideology: Carlism
- Colours: Red and White
- Mother party: Traditionalist Communion
- Magazine: Pelayos (es)

Pelayos was a Spanish paramilitary youth organization of the Carlist political party Traditionalist Communion during the Second Spanish Republic.

== History ==
Pelayos was founded by the Carlist movement of Spain during the early 1930s. The group was named after Pelagius of Córdoba (known as "Pelayo" in Spanish) who was killed as a martyr in 926AD. Members of Pelayos were given pre-military training and indoctrinated into the Carlist beliefs. During the Spanish Civil War, the magazine Pelayos (es) was created to spread Carlist values among Spanish youths.

== Song of the Pelayos ==
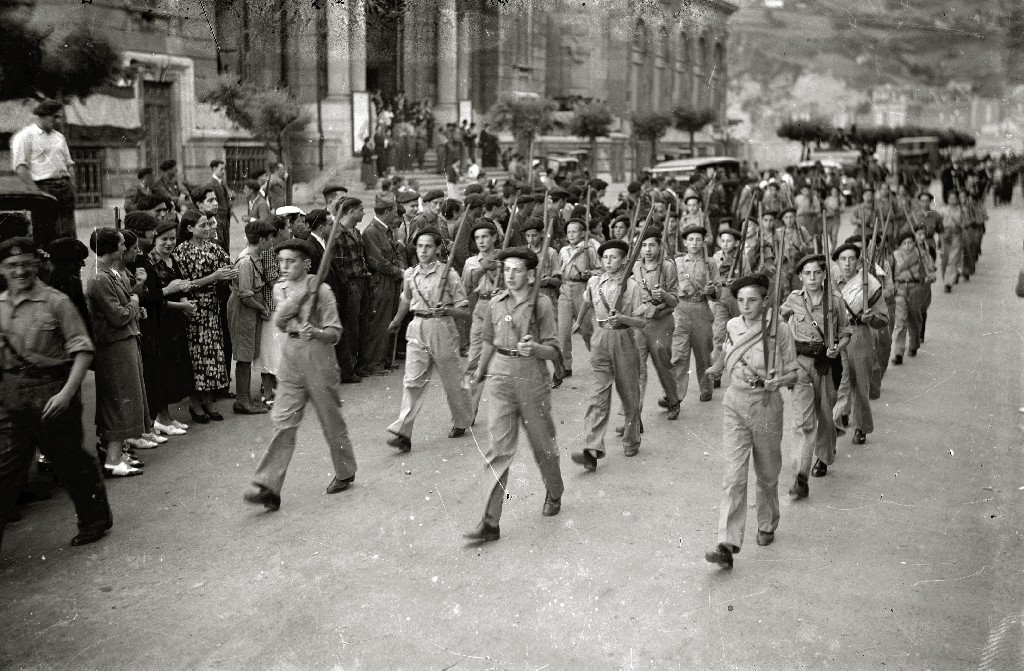
Pelayos in 1936.

Somos niños los Pelayos mas seremos sin tardar los soldados más valientes que a su Patria salvarán.	We are children, the Pelayos We will be without delay The very valiant soldiers That save their Fatherland.
