= José Roca y Ponsa =

Spanish Roman Catholic priest

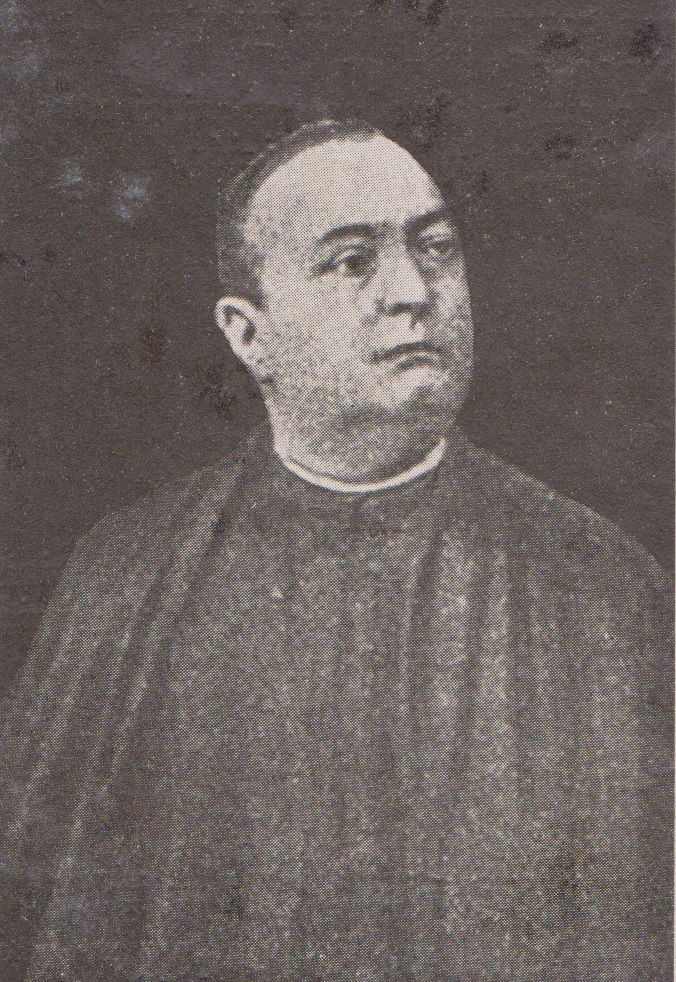
- Born: José Roca y Ponsa; 1852; Vic, Spain
- Died: 1938 (aged 85–86); Las Palmas, Spain
- Occupation: religious
- Known for: priest, theorist
- Political party: Carlism

José Roca y Ponsa (1852–1938), known also as "Magistral de Sevilla", was a Spanish Roman Catholic priest. In historiography he is known mostly for his role in the 1899 conflict between the archbishops of Toledo and Seville. Catapulted to nationwide notoriety, in the early 1900s he was a point of reference for heated debates on religion and politics; today he is considered a representative of intransigent religious fundamentalism. Roca served as lecturing canon by the cathedrals of Las Palmas (1876-1892) and Seville (1892-1917), animated some diocesan periodicals, and published numerous booklets. He was one of very few nationally recognizable personalities of the Spanish Church who openly and systematically supported the Carlist cause, though he remained sympathetic also towards the Integrist breed of Traditionalism.

== Family and youth ==
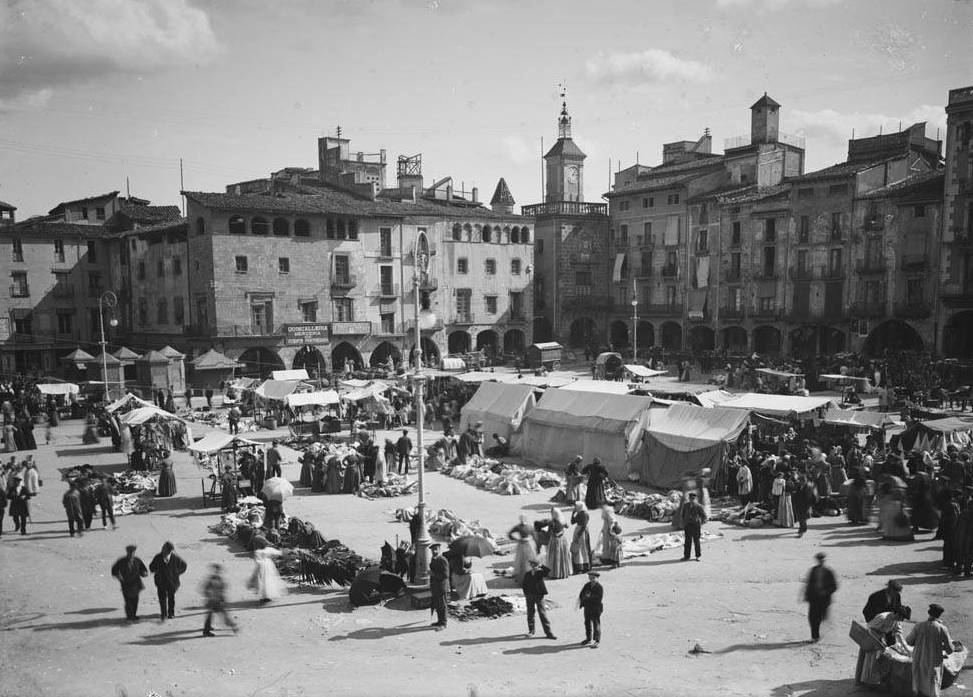
Vich, 19th c.

The ancient Catalan family of Roca became very branched throughout the centuries, with its representatives scattered across all of the region. It is not clear what particular line the ancestors of Roca y Ponsa followed; none of the sources consulted provides any information on his distant forefathers. It is established that his father, Cayetano Roca Subirachs (1828-1918), was a native of Vich; he formed part of the local bourgeoisie and in the mid-19th century either owned or otherwise operated a corset factory, manufacture or workshop. At an unspecified time he married Engracia Ponsa; nothing is known either about her or about her family. The couple settled at Calle de la Riera. It is not clear how many children they had; among José's siblings there was at least one brother Cayetano and two sisters, Dolores and Margarita.

The children were brought up in a pious and religious home, though there is no available information on José's childhood. A few sources claim that he “commenced ecclesiastic education” upon entering the local diocesan Vich seminary in 1861; it is not clear whether at the age of 9 he was indeed admitted to the seminary or was rather attending a school run by local Church structures. Roca y Ponsa spent teenage years in his native town as a seminarian preparing for religious service. His education in Seminario de Vich was terminated in unclear circumstances, related to the fall of the Isabelline monarchy and the Glorious Revolution. Later, vague accounts suggest that in the early 1870s he was engaged either in the Carlist conspiracy or Carlist propaganda, and that “in times of political agitation, persecutions, deportations” Roca y Ponsa was “declared undesirable and expelled from the peninsula in order not to interfere in consolidation of revolutionary work”.

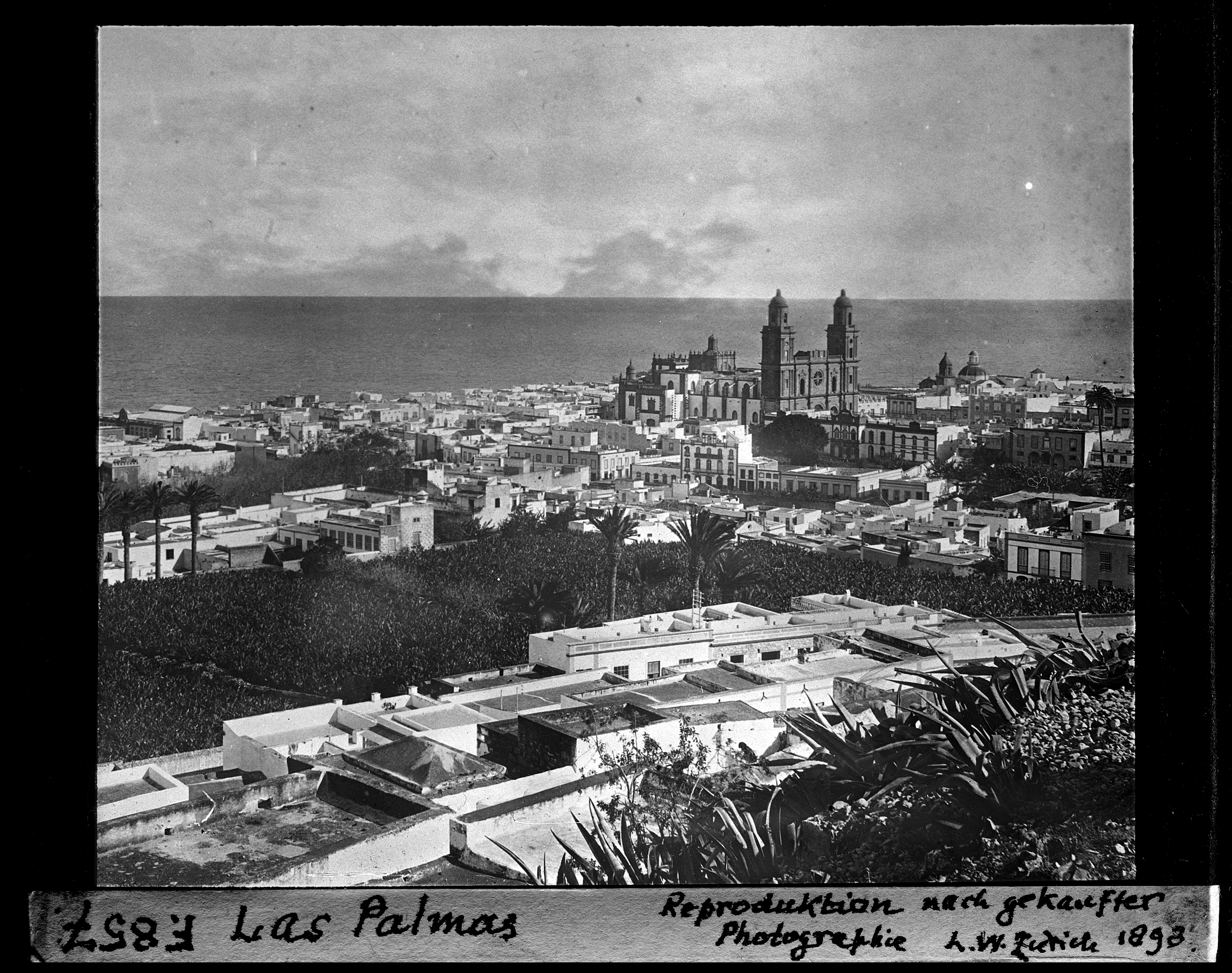
Las Palmas, 19th c.

Either in late 1872 or in early 1873 Roca y Ponsa and 3 other Vich seminarians were transferred to the seminary in Las Palmas; it is there he completed bachillerato in teología in 1873. He became a deacon in 1874 and was ordained a priest in 1875; he held his first Mass on 27 March 1875. Between June and September Roca y Ponsa served as ecónomo in the Canarian village of Artenara, where in 1876 he ascended to párroco castrense. The same year, and following a brief spell on the peninsula, he obtained bachillerato, licenciatura and doctorado of canon law in Granada. Back on the Canary Islands he assumed teaching at the Las Palmas seminary, first as catedrático of Hermenéutica y Oratoria Sagrada but over the years having classes also in Latin, philosophy, Hebrew and dogmatics. Still in 1876 he passed exams for prebenda de Canónigo Lectoral by the Las Palmas cathedral.

== Ecclesiastic career ==
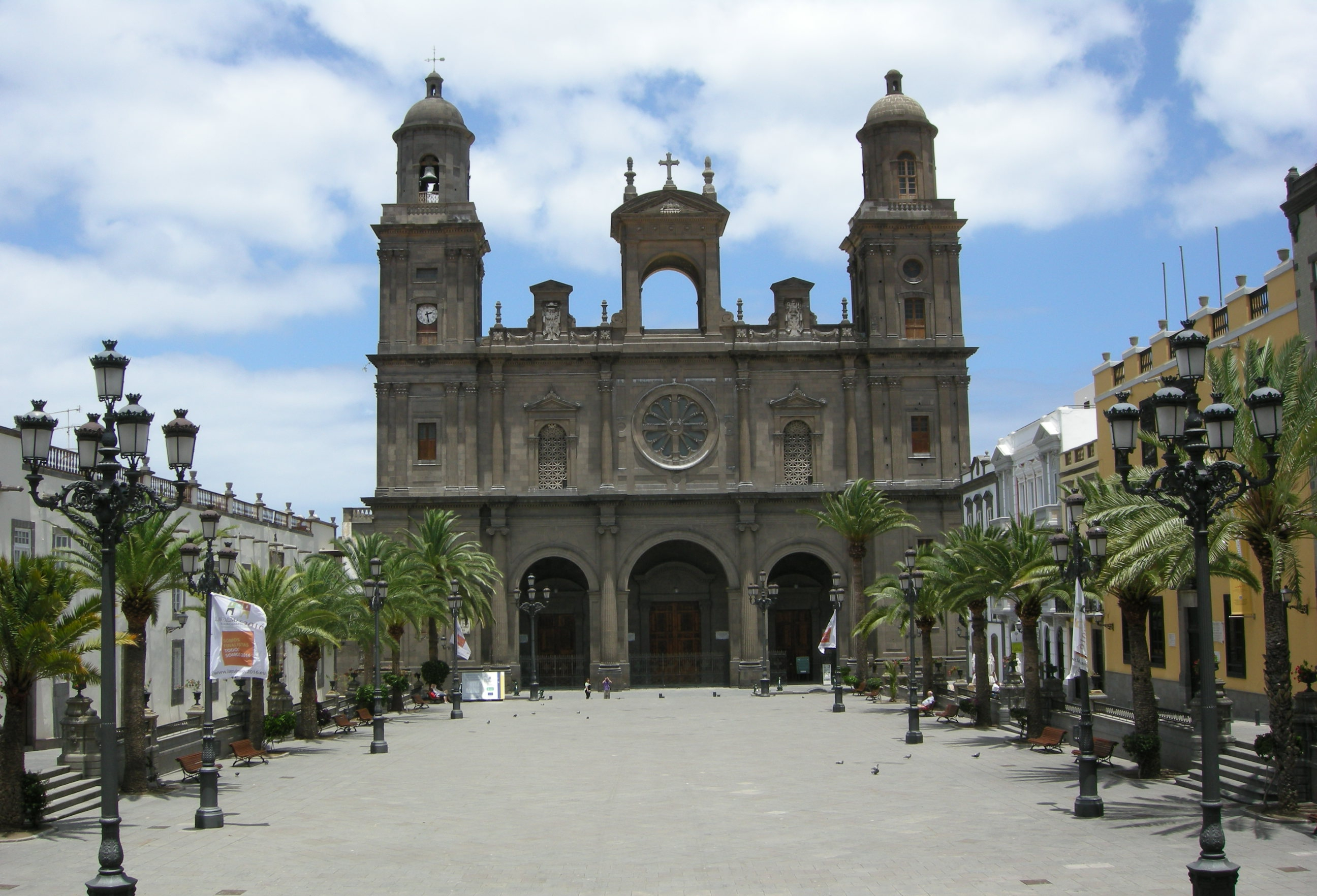
Las Palmas Cathedral

In Las Palmas Roca y Ponsa kept serving as lecturing canon by the cathedral and as catedrático by the local seminary. Another role he assumed was managing newly launched diocesan reviews. He was gradually gaining recognition; in 1877 the Canary bishop José María Urquinaona nominated him head of the diocesan pilgrimage to Rome. Roca was also assuming prestigious roles during local ceremonies. His position in the Las Palmas hierarchy was enhanced with the 1879 arrival of the new bishop, José Proceso Pozuelo; in 1881 Pozuelo nominated him to sort out the politically sensitive question of the local cemetery. At the turn of the decades Roca launched a short-lived diocesan daily and then a bi-weekly, which he managed until 1888. His militant articles aimed against the liberal regime cost him trial; in 1885 he was sentenced to living 3,5 years 25 km away from Las Palmas, but it is not sure whether the sentence was enforced. In 1890 Roca ascended to rectorship of Seminario de Canarias.

In the early 1890s Roca was already basking in local prestige as a great preacher. However, for reasons which remain unclear he decided to leave the islands and applied for the position of canon at the Seville Cathedral. In 1892 he was nominated canonigo penitenciario, and in 1893 he took over Canongía Magistral. His first years in Andalusia were uneventful, as in the mid-1890s he was noted merely for regular sermons. Things changed in 1899 when Roca gained nationwide recognition following publication of his pamphlet directed against teachings of the primate, cardinal Sancha. Because it was wrongly assumed that the criticism was authorised by the Seville archbishop Spínola it caused a scandal and widespread debate. As a well-known personality he was then active in Catholic congresses staged in the early 1900s. Though he gained recognition bordering notoriety, Roca did not progress in terms of his ecclesiastical career, especially since in 1911 his new booklets triggered a negative response from the Vatican. Apart from his role of lecturing canon he assumed only some new teaching jobs in the local seminary, at Hispalense, and at various private establishments.

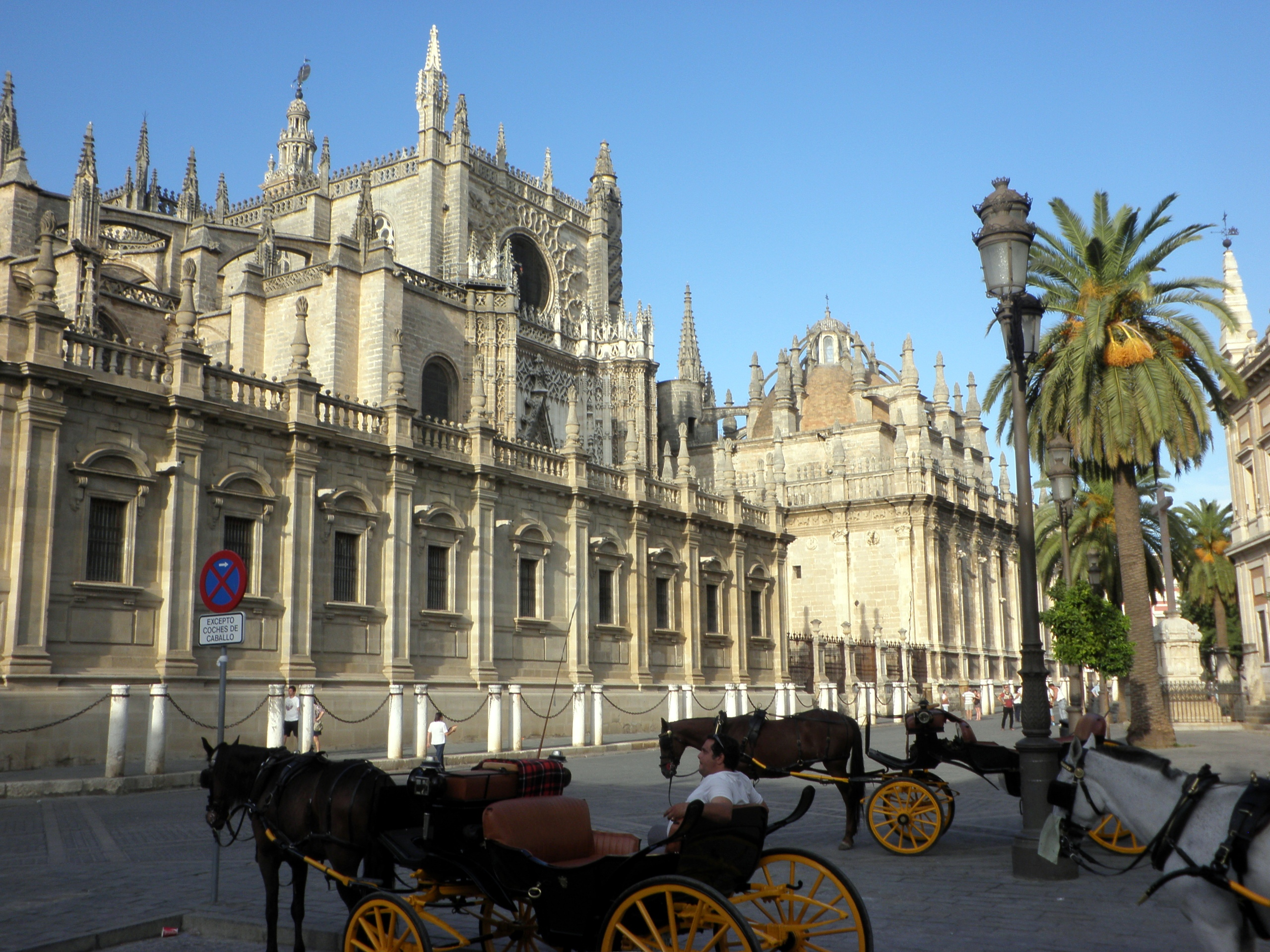
Seville Cathedral

In the mid-1910s Roca started to withdraw from active religious service, especially when in 1914 he suffered a grave accident which led to continuous health problems. Upon reaching the regular retirement age he resigned his canon position and in 1917 entered Congregación de Sacerdotes de San Felipe Neri, an order for retired chaplains. On a decreasingly regular basis Roca kept delivering sermons at various Seville churches and in 1925 celebrated 50 years of priesthood. A member of numerous religious congregations, in the late 1920s he rose to executive roles in some but his activity was limited by growing problems with eyesight. His last sermons in Seville are dated for mid-1931; around that time he moved back to Las Palmas, where he was taken care of by the family of his sister. Half-blind, he performed some minor local religious roles until the late 1930s.

== Catechist, publisher, author ==
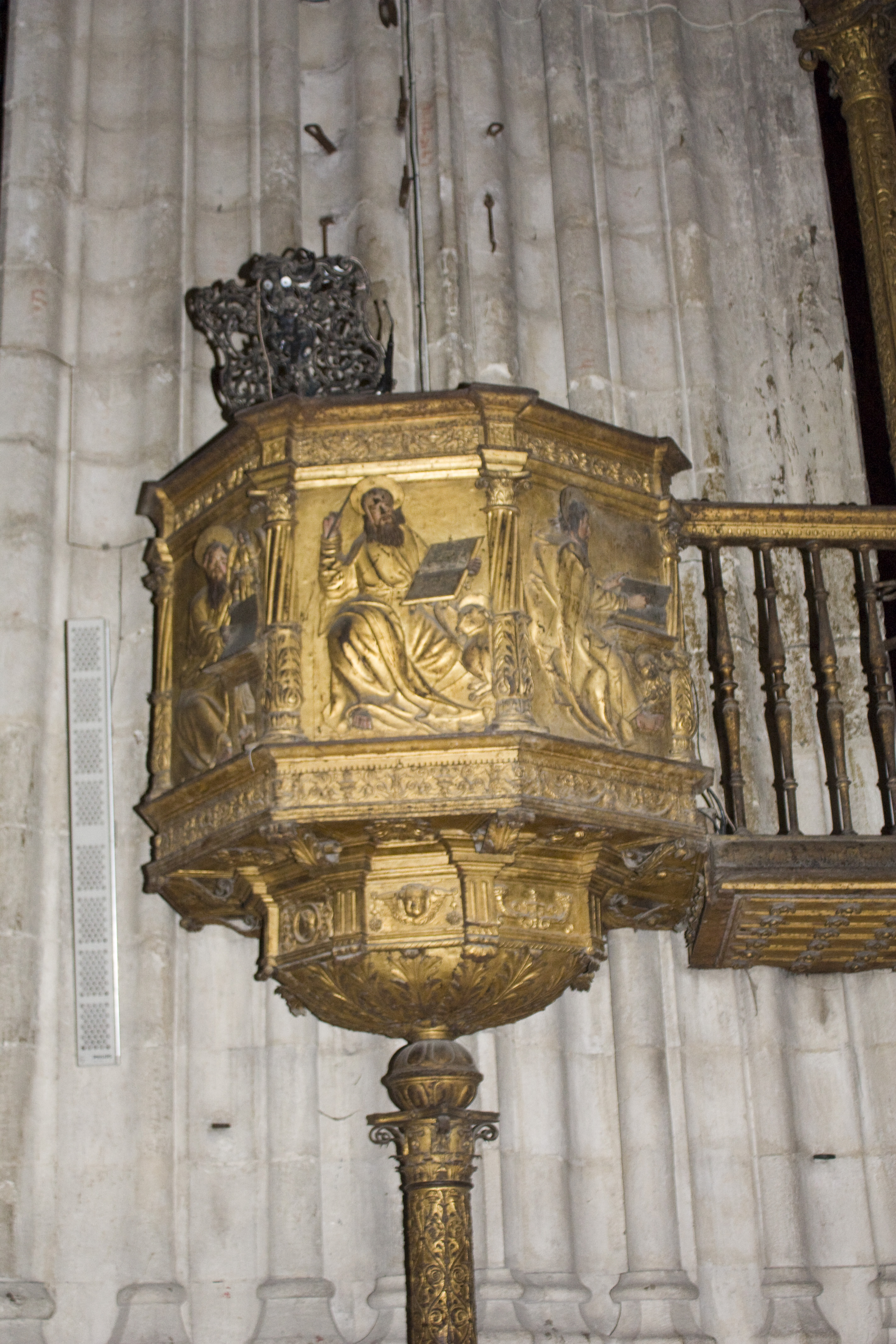
pulpit, Seville cathedral

Roca gained his name first as orator and already in 1879 he was assigned to deliver important sermons during prestigious religious events. In the early 1890s he was locally well known in Las Palmas for his homilies, the image then reinforced during the 25-year-service in Seville. His sermons, passionate and militant, were “a skillful mixture of dogmatic theology and modern apologetics in the refutation of errors of our times”; a few of them were later gathered and published in separate booklets. Some later commentators appreciated Roca's popularization of great apologists but they note also that because of “the fire of his blunt and passionate word”, in his case “orator surpassed theoretician”. Especially after 1910 Roca used to speak also at secular venues, usually marked by right-wing militancy; some were half-scientific sessions commemorating personalities like Jaime Balmes and Marcelino Menendez Pelayo or Traditionalism-flavored, openly political conferences.

For about 15 years Roca was the moving spirit behind a number of Catholic Canarias periodicals, either issued directly by the bishopric or by related institutions. Since the early 1870s he managed a El Golgota, though its lifetime is uncertain; it went beyond the format of a local parochial print, as thanks to Roca's ingenuity El Golgota had correspondents in France, England and Italy. In 1879 he launched a diocesan daily, El Faro Católico de Canarias. It was probably rather short-lived, as in 1881 Roca focused on a new bi-weekly La Revista de las Palmas. It turned out to be a more lasting enterprise, with youth supplement Los Jueves de la Revista added in 1885; as director, Roca managed the publication until 1888. Having moved to Seville in 1899 Roca launched a diocesan daily El Correo de Andalucia and for a while was its key editor. In the 1900s he vigorously took part in conferences known as Asamblea Nacional de Buena Prensa and until the early 1910s remained active in their Sevillan outpost, inspecting Catholic papers in terms of their orthodoxy.

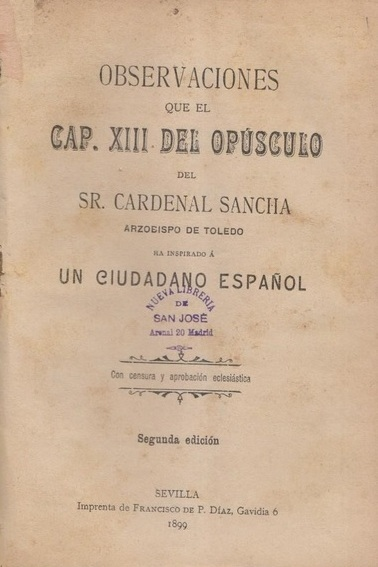
Observaciones... (1899)

Between 1873 and 1935 Roca published some 15 booklets, formatted either as collections of essays, often based on his earlier sermons, or as pamphlets. They usually dwelled on religion and politics; the author used to offer his – routinely highly critical – diagnosis of Spanish public life, and advanced his own suggestions for the future. Some were responses to specific issues, persons or episodes; some contained more general lectures. Roca used to sign with various, easily attributable pen-names, though he was best known as "Magistral de Sevilla"; his late writings were published under his own name. The booklet which made particular impact and caused nationwide controversy was Observaciones que el capitulo XIII del opúsculo del cardenal Sancha ha inspirado a un ciudadano español (1899). ¿Se puede, en conciencia, pertenecer al partido liberal-conservador? (1912) and ¿Cuál es el mal mayor y cuál es el mal menor? (1912) also gained sort of notoriety, namely when the Vatican voiced its skepticism as to the political intransigence advanced; moderate Catholics were quick to stigmatize them as “doctrinas condenadas por Su Santidad”.

== Outlook ==
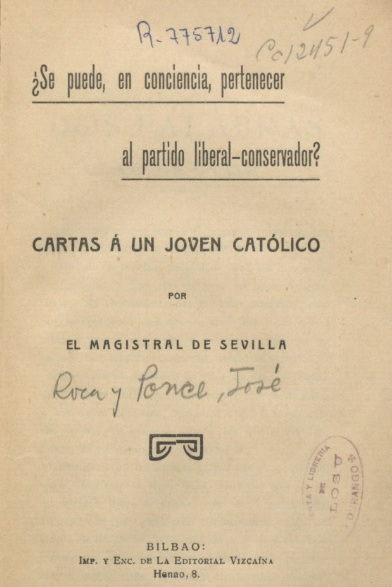
¿Se puede ... (1912)

Roca y Ponsa gained his name mostly thanks to views on religion and politics. They were underpinned by confidence that a community without an officially accepted and enforced orthodoxy, a community where various concepts of public life constantly compete for domination, can not form an orderly, peaceful, operational society. In his view the only appropriate orthodoxy was Catholicism, which for centuries shaped the Spanish self and contributed to greatness of the nation; Catholic principles should serve as guidelines organizing both state and society. Their antithesis was liberalism, not only useless as a political doctrine, but also unacceptable as a moral concept; it remained responsible for decline of Spain and would lead to further calamities in the future. Roca's view was fairly typical for some sections of the Spanish society, yet it was expressed in a most absolute and intransigent form; politics was viewed as battleground between God and Satan.

Roca understood Spanish public life as constant confrontation between Liberalism and Christianity, the two being clearly incompatible. He classified all political groupings into just two categories: liberal and anti-liberal ones; basically, only the Carlists and the Integrists were considered part of the latter; all other parties formed the ungodly, sinister liberal camp. Roca reserved particular criticism for the Conservatives, who accepted the Restoration political framework; though theoretically catering to Christian sections of the society, in fact with their hypocrisy they undermined Christian values. They were guilty of accepting an erroneous understanding of lesser evil, which in fact paved the way for revolution; similarly, he blamed for “malmenorismo” also some sections of the religious hierarchy. It was his pamphlet against the primate, who called for Catholics to “remain faithful and trust in the [liberal] government”, that caused heated nationwide debate, especially since Roca quoted papal authority.

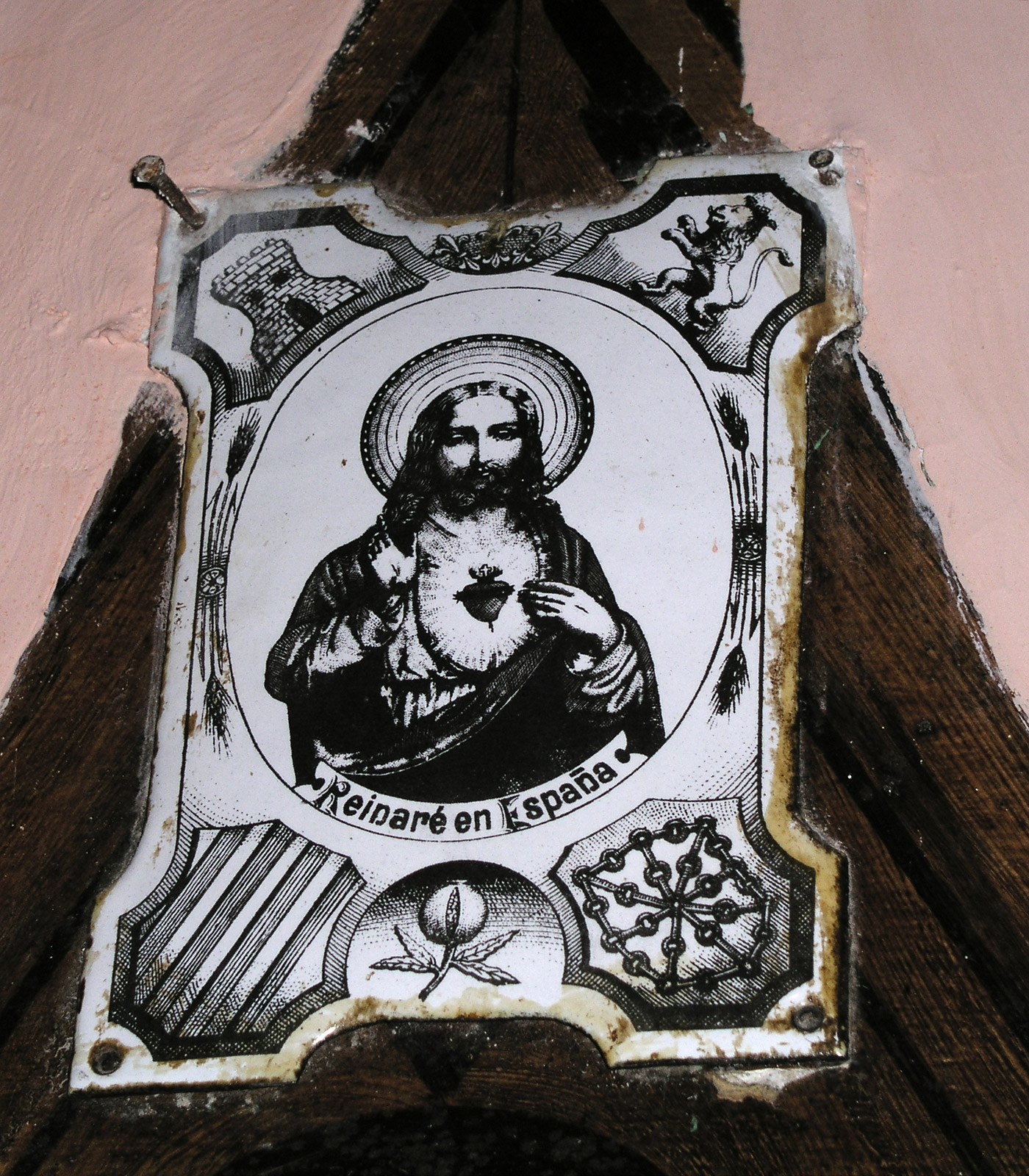
I will reign in Spain

In the early 1900s Roca tried to format the emerging popular Catholic political movement, which at the time was taking shape at numerous Catholic congresses, as a vehicle of militant intransigent policy. He tried to orient them towards rejection of malmenorismo, which in practical terms would have stood for adopting an anti-regime posture; having failed, he then denounced the congresses as doomed and based on false principles. Though at the time classical Spanish liberalism was in decline, giving way to new socialist and republican movements, Roca did not re-focus his approach; for him, new radical revolutionary ideas were merely extreme embodiments of liberalism. While absolutism – also considered a brainchild of the liberal fallacy - was usurpation of an individual, republicanism, nationalism or socialism were also usurpations against godly order, but attempted in the name of specific groups. He kept opposing also social-Catholic and Christian-democratic movements, tailored to operate in a liberalism-ridden democratic regime and guilty of abandoning unity between religious and political objectives.

== Carlist ==
Carlist standard

Roca was one of very few recognizable figures of the Catholic Church who openly and systematically supported the Carlist cause. He inherited Carlist enthusiasm from his father. As Vich was “a city known as a centre of clerical Carlism and Integrism” Roca got his zeal reinforced during the seminary years; involved in Carlist conspiracy in the early 1870s, he was then forced to move to the Canary Islands. Under his management El Golgota, theoretically a Catholic diocesan periodical, became almost undistinguishable from local Las Palmas Traditionalist reviews of the late 1870s; also Roca's sermons and writings were increasingly saturated with the Traditionalist vision of religion and politics. The same line was maintained in La Revista of the 1880s; the bi-weekly assaulted Carlist breakaways led by Pidal and supported the intransigent anti-regime line advocated by Nocedal. However, when in 1888 the latter broke away from orthodox Carlism himself to set up the branch known as Integrism, Roca did not take sides and remained equidistant. Some sources refer to him as “ardent Integrist”, some name him “blockhead Carlist”, and some note that his departure to Andalusia weakened the position of both Canarian Carlists and Integrists.

During his Canarian and Andalusian spells Roca did not engage in Traditionalist political structures, though following the move back to the peninsula his relations with the movement strengthened; under pen-names he contributed to the unofficial Carlist mouthpiece El Correo Español and other regional party dailies, helped to launch El Radical, a Seville periodical issued by the local Juventud Jaimista, toured the country invited by Jaimista youth, or attended party banquets hailing the Carlist leader Bartolomé Feliú; in return, Roca was cheered as great theorist and author by various Carlist bodies. However, he cultivated also the Integrist link; on some public conferences he appeared jointly with pundits like Manuel Senante, remained on friendly terms with Juan Olazábal and perhaps contributed also to the chief Integrist daily, El Siglo Futuro.

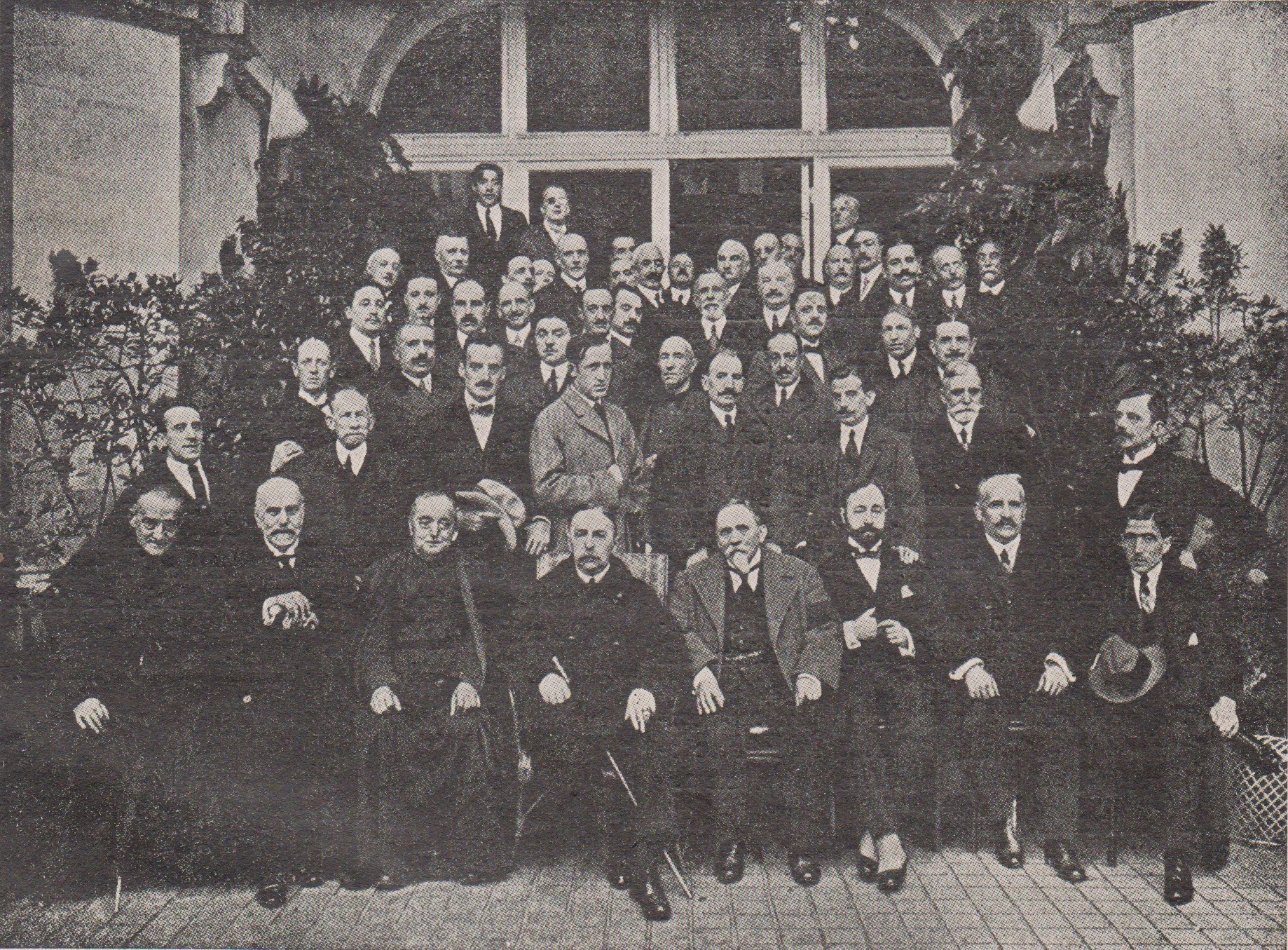
Roca at Junta de Biarritz, 1919

As a key attendant Roca took part in a grand Carlist meeting known as Magna Junta de Biarritz of 1919 and delivered one of his key lectures; his embrace with the claimant Don Jaime was among iconic scenes from the rally. In 1920 Roca helped to re-format a Catholic daily El Correo de Andalucia and employed Domingo Tejera as its manager, paving his future path as a Traditionalist editor. In 1924 Don Jaime conferred upon Roca the Orden de la Legitimidad Proscrita. In 1930 and along other Carlists, Roca interacted with cardenal Segura, perplexed about his statements which appeared to endorse Alfonsism; the same year he assisted in a grand rally of Andalusian Integrists. In the first Republican elections of 1931 he ran in Las Palmas as independent Catholic candidate, but failed disastrously. In the early 1930s he was hailed as the great pundit of the cause and indeed in 1934 the claimant Alfonso Carlos nominated him the second member of Consejo de Cultura Tradicionalista; as such, in 1935 he published at least one piece in the Carlist intellectual review Tradición.

== Reception and legacy ==
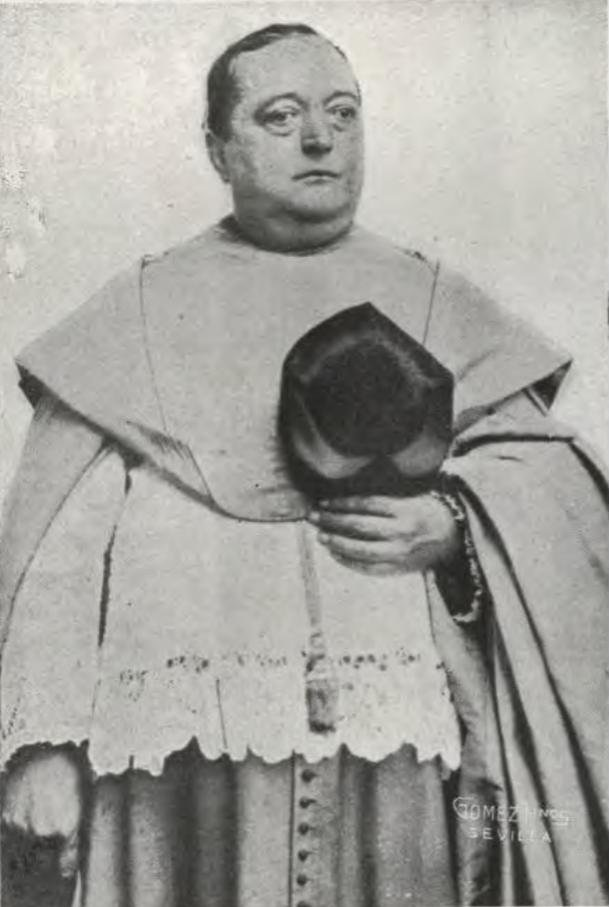
Roca y Ponsa, 1910s

Until the late 1890s Roca y Ponsa was known locally and appreciated in Catholic circles of Las Palmas and Sevilla for his unyielding, well-delivered sermons. It was the 1899 Sancha–Spínola controversy which catapulted him to nationwide notoriety; Traditionalist dailies saluted him as righteous Christian, while progressist papers ridiculed him as reactionary relic. The issue was formally brought before the Vatican; the pronouncement of the Extraordinary Congregation for Ecclesiastic Affairs, which somewhat ambiguously sided with Sancha, was welcomed with relief in governmental circles; also the regent Maria Christina spoke out. The debate demonstrated that Roca was not isolated among the Spanish clergy, and at one point it seemed that the episcopate was uncertain about the way forward. However, in the following decades the Church opted for a moderate political strategy; Roca's defeat was sealed by another official Vatican pronouncement of 1911; it stated that though doctrinally correct, his writings were not official political recommendations for Catholics. Since the 1910s Roca remained a champion of Catholic virtues only for extreme right-wing groupings like Integrists or Carlists.

Save for a single article written during early Francoism, after death Roca y Ponsa generally fell into oblivion. He has been only marginally present in the Carlist discourse. A 1961 collective work listed him among all-time masters of Traditionalism. It seems that in the 1970s in Seville there was an organisation named Fundación Roca y Ponsa, yet there is nothing known about its activity. In the 1990s the Canarian Carlists attempted to revive his memory; they set up Círculo Tradicionalista Roca y Ponsa in Las Palmas, launched a project on Catholic counter-revolutionary thought on the islands and operated a dedicated web page. The initiative died out; there is only one minor biographic article on Roca and another one on his early writings from the 1870s. Currently he is mentioned – rather marginally – on some Traditionalism-flavored websites. Occasional religious publications dedicated to Las Palmas or Seville note his contributions, though usually only in passing.

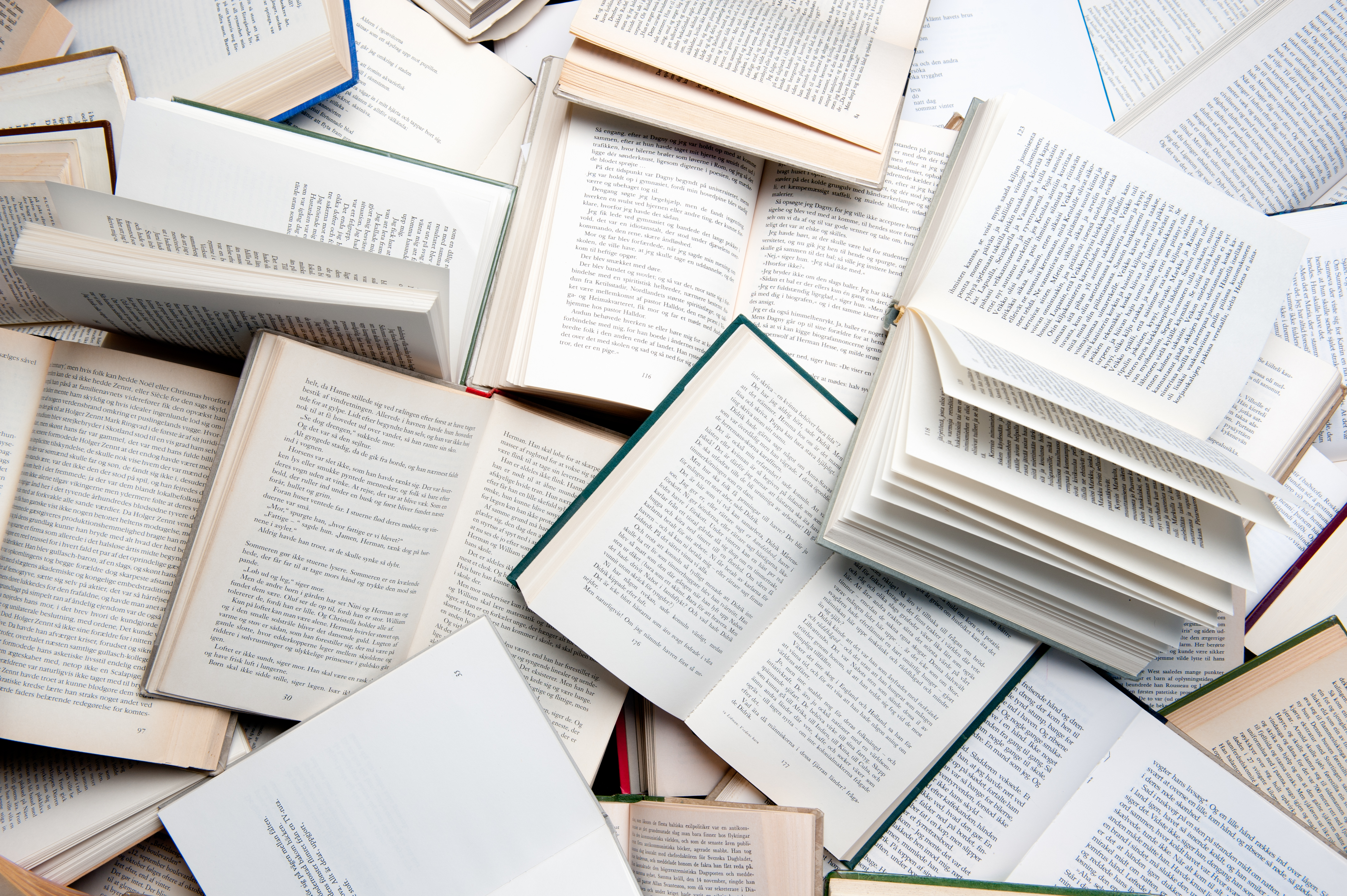

In present-day historiography Roca features almost exclusively as a protagonist of the Sancha–Spínola affair. He is typically presented as representative of reactionary, sectarian currents, who advanced intolerant fanaticism and provoked a grave crisis between the archbishops of Toledo and Seville. He might also be noted as author of primitive, run-of-the-mill, anti-Darwinian tirades, failed contender in early discussions on Spanish political Catholicism, or a sample of ultramontanism. More favorably disposed scholars list him among theorists like Manterola, Mateos Gago and Sardá y Salvany or position him as a classical example of Integrism. In wide public discourse Roca is almost absent; if noted, he is mentioned as the one who triggered a conflict between two hierarchs. In 2012 he was unexpectedly elevated to protagonist of an urban legend in-the-making. A podcast series Milenio 3, focused on paranormal activity, suggested that a house in Villanueva de Ariscal, Roca's home during his Seville tenure, was haunted; the authors floated gossip speculations about his private life. There is a street commemorating Roca in Las Palmas.

== See also ==
- Carlism
- Integrism (Spain)
- Traditionalism (Spain)
