= Luis Hernando de Larramendi =

Spanish Carlist politician and theorist

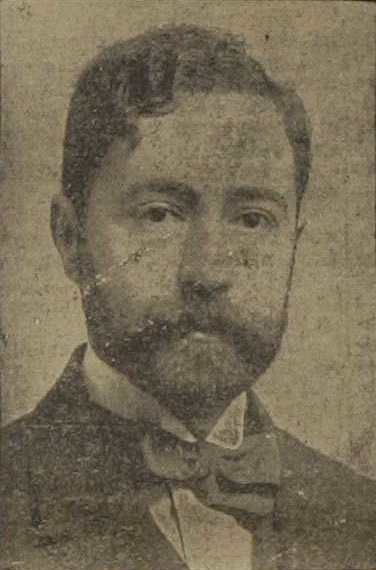
- Born: Luis Hernando de Larramendi Ruiz; 1882; Madrid
- Died: 1957 (aged 74–75); Madrid
- Occupation: lawyer
- Known for: politician
- Political party: Carlism

Luis Hernando de Larramendi Ruiz (September 27, 1882 – 1957) was a Spanish Carlist politician and theorist. Though his term as a party jefe was rather short (1919-1921), he stands out as monumental figure in history of the 20th-century Carlism, remaining among its leaders for some 40 years and taking part in decision-making process from the mid-1910s until the mid-1950s. As author he is recognized for his 1937 work, El sistema tradicional, an orthodox lecture of Traditionalism.

== Family and youth ==
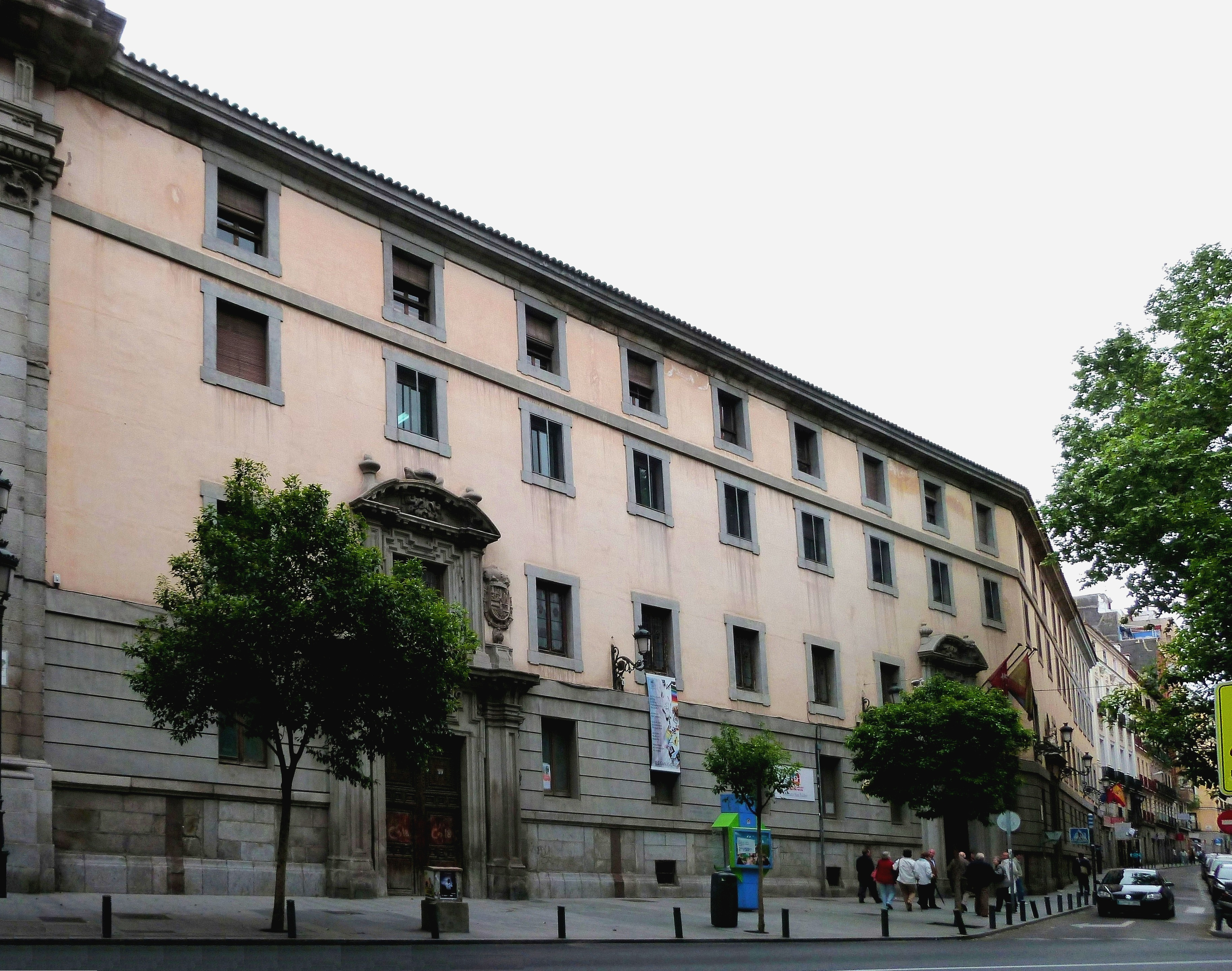
Instituto de San Isidro

Luis’ paternal family was related to Old Castile; one of his ancestors gained recognition as member of the Cura Merino unit, fighting the French during the War of Independence; he served under the same commander also during the First Carlist War. Later on the family found itself on the descendant path and Luis’ grandparents were referred to as "laboradores modestos". His father, Mariano Hernando Ruiz (1861-1913), originated from Riaza in the province of Segovia; he studied medicine but upon graduating has never practiced; instead, he made a living by trading arts, mostly paintings and sculptures. Heavily engaged in preparing the Spanish pavilion for the Paris Exposition Universelle of 1889, apart from presenting art he also co-ordinated works related to construction of a bullring in the Trocadero park. He has never made it to the affluent bourgeoisie strata and back in Madrid suffered financial problems, living first at Calle Ancha de San Bernardo and then at Calle Lista. Mariano Hernando married Maria Cuadrado, with whom he had 3 children. Upon her premature death he remarried with Luisa Larramendi Serrano, also a madrileña though of Alavese origins. The couple had 6 children, Luis born as the oldest of the siblings and the only son.

The young Luis was first educated at the Madrid Instituto de San Isídro, a prestigious Jesuit establishment with long distinguished record; it is there where he got his baccalaureate and where he made acquaintances, some of them later public figures like Luis Urquijo, marqués de Amurrio. However, it is also at the college where despite his penchant for letters he ran into problems with the teacher of Retórica y Poética, resulting in Luis’ later lukewarm attitude towards the Jesuits and formal education. At unspecified date he entered Facultad de Derecho at Universidad de Madrid; not averse towards bohemian lifestyle, he befriended the likes of Alejandro Sawa and Ramón Valle Inclán. Date of graduation is not known, apart that it was prior to 1905; at that time he was already practicing law as an intern, to open his own law office later on. In honor of his maternal family Luis got his name changed from Hernando y Larramendi to Hernando de Larramendi y Ruiz.

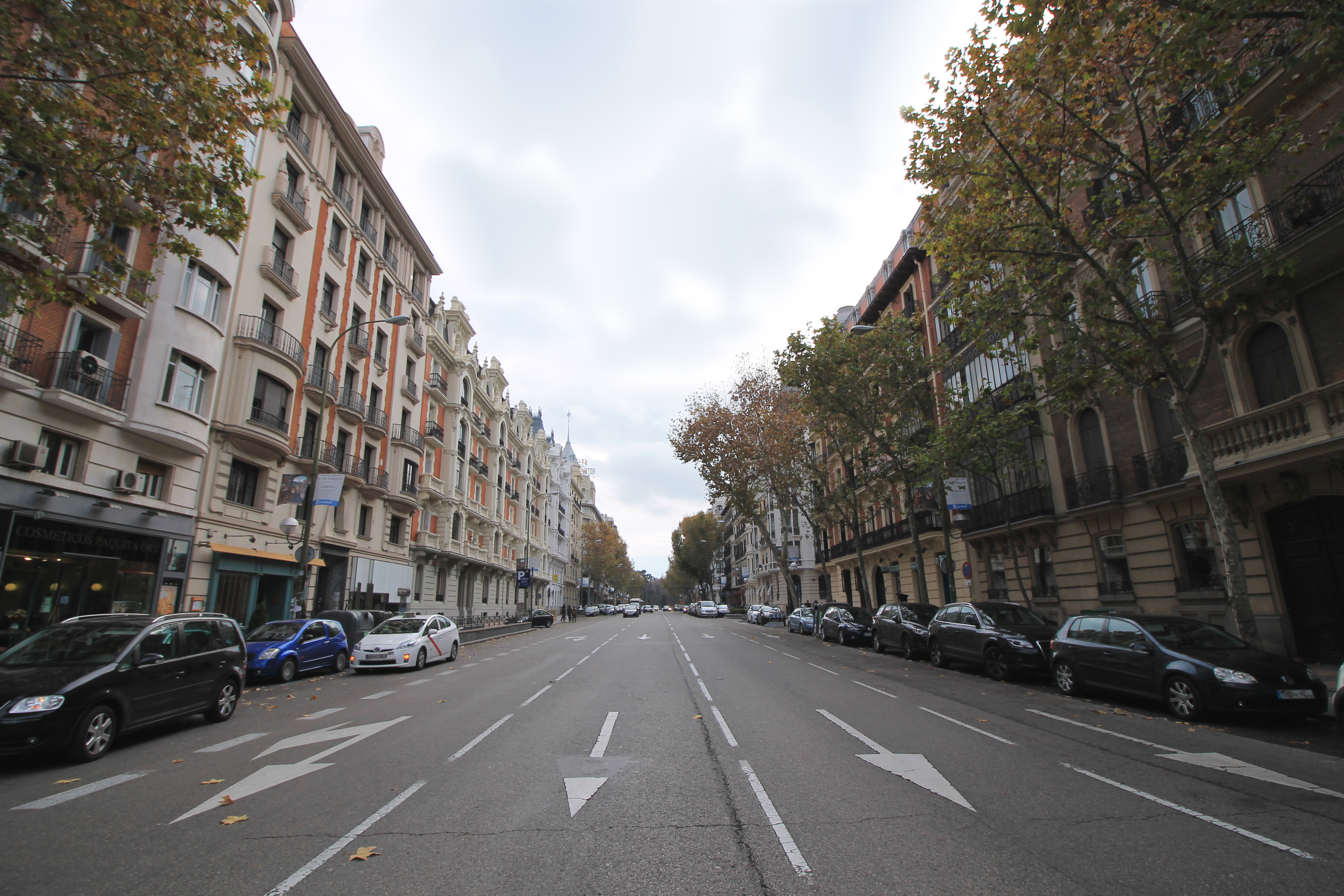
Calle Velázquez, Madrid

During his academic years Larramendi met a sister of his university colleague Mariano de Montiano, María de Montiano y Uriarte (1886-1976), originating from Bilbao. Daughter of a physician, descendant to a noble prestigious family and considered the most handsome girl in the city, she was also fanatically Basque. They married at unspecified time, though prior to 1904; he tended to be quiet and unassuming, she was also introvert, but of a decisive and bold character. The couple settled at Calle Valázquez; they had 9 children, 6 boys and 3 girls. The oldest son, Ignacio Hernando de Larramendi, became known nationwide as longtime manager and the moving spirit behind MAPFRE, a corporate insurance giant; other children did not grow to prominence nationwide. Luis' grandson, Luis Hernando de Larramendi y Martínez, took part in numerous Carlist activities of the early 21st century.

== Early public career (prior to 1912) ==
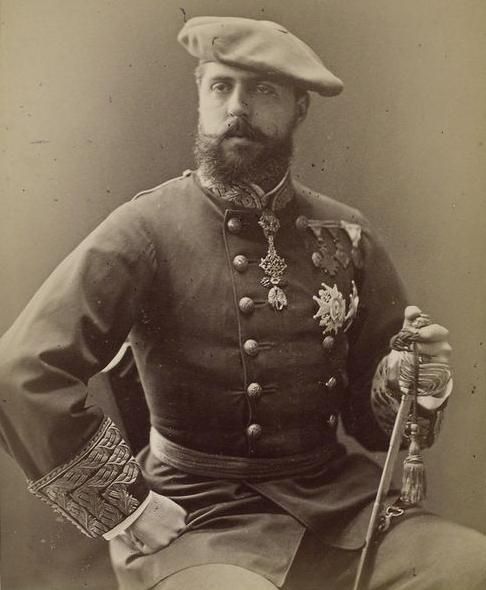
Don Carlos, Carlist king 1868-1909

Mariano Hernando was not a Carlist; it was thanks to the influence of his paternal grandfather that during his childhood and youth Luis embraced Carlism. When at the university he befriended a number of Traditionalist-minded students like conde Rodezno, conde de Doña Marina and Rafael Díaz Aguado Salaberry; together with them in the first decade of the 20th century he was active in Juventud Carlista and Congregación de los Luises, a Jesuit youth organization. In 1904 he was briefly editor-in-chief of an ephemeral Carlist daily El Correo de Guipúzcoa, though it is not clear whether he lived in San Sebastián at that time. In Madrid he gained recognition in 1905 becoming secretary of Sección de Ciencias Historicas of Ateneo de Madrid, though principally as a young and successful lawyer, involved in cases gaining wider publicity.

When in Ateneo Larramendi embarked on Catholic propaganda, trying to confront the growing secularization tide. In 1906 he addressed Cortes with legal note, aimed against the plan to introduce civil marriages; in 1910 he published Cómo defendernos de las escuelas laicas, a booklet aimed against the concept of public, secular, free and obligatory school, launched by the republican groupings; Larramendi claimed that fathers had the right to bring up their children the way they wanted. Campaigning against secular education carried him as far as to Andalusia, though his principal battleground were various public fora of the capital; apart from the Ateneo he spoke also in theatres and apart from education discussed also Catholic syndicalism and episodes of public blasphemy, soon growing to president of the Madrid branch of Juventud Jaimista.

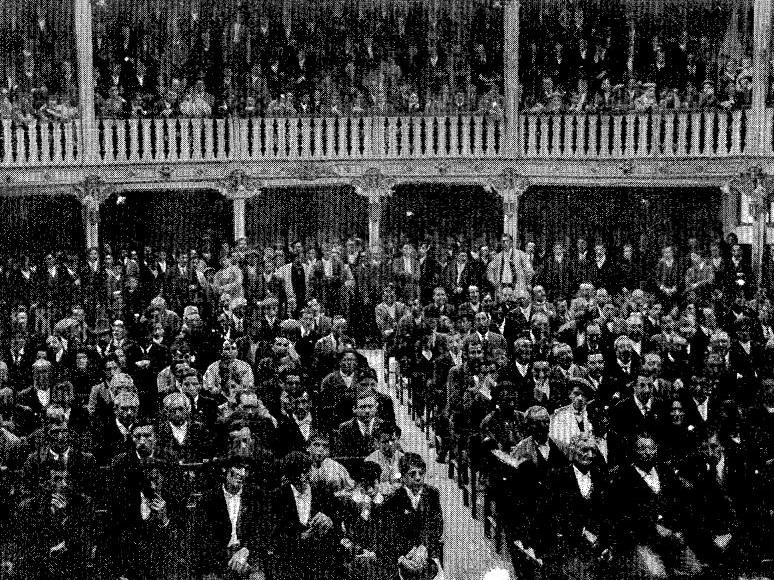
Carlist meeting, 1911

In 1910 Larramendi decided to run on Traditionalist ticket for the Cortes; as he was unrelated to Asturias, it is not clear why he chose the district of Oviedo. Competing against local heavyweights like Melquíades Álvarez and José Manuel Pedregal he stood little chance and lost, afterwards appealing corruption and unfair deployment of Guardia Civil. The following year he tried his chances in local elections in Valencia; this time banking on support of local Carlists like Manuel Simó Marín and Luis Lucia, the latter running a daily Diario de Valencia; the bid proved unsuccessful. In Madrid he engaged in launching a periodical of Traditionalist youth, which eventually materialized as Juventud – Organo de las Juventudes Tradicionalistas. Given lack of broader Carlist base in Madrid the initiative proved to be short-lived, and the weekly was issued in 1912-1913 only. Nevertheless, Larramendi was already well known among conservative youth of the capital: "quién no conoce al simpático y cultisimo Larramendi?" – asked one of the periodicals. With ease of writing, by the mid-1910s he supplied Carlist periodicals as far as Tortosa, Castellón, Alicante and Badajoz, let alone other titles in Madrid.

== Rising star (1912-1919) ==
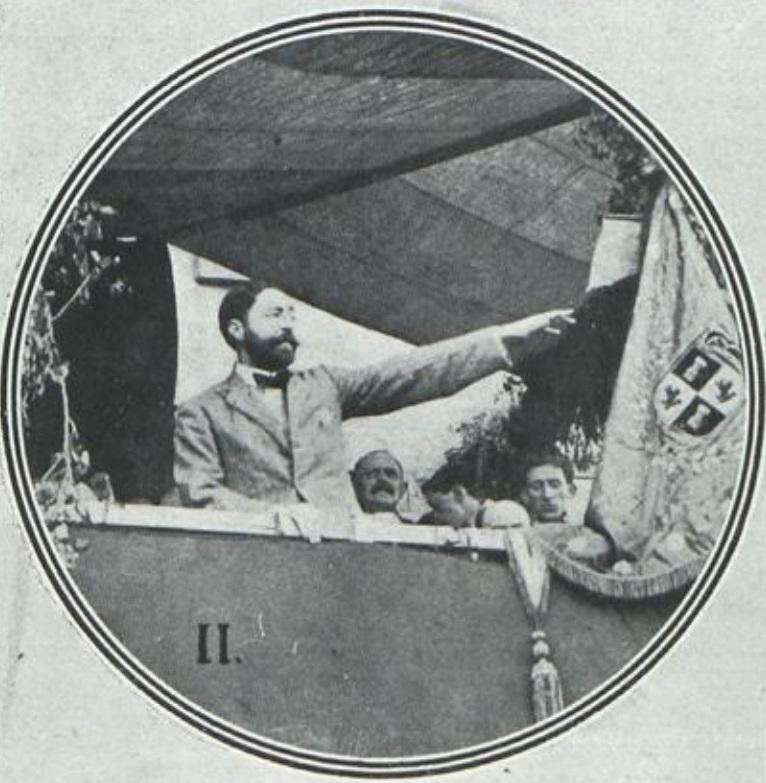
Larramendi speaking, 1912

In the 1910s Larramendi neared the socially-minded Carlists known as the "Zaragoza group" and composed of Pascual Comín, Salvador Minguijón, Severino Aznar and Inocencio Jiménez; they animated La Paz Social periodical and the likewise named booklet series that the first Larramendi's work formed part of. He co-operated with their Centro de Publicaciones Católicas, fascinated by French Catholic scholars grouped around Leon Garriguet. Though he eventually failed to translate Antonin Sertillanges, thanks to his work the Centro released the Spanish version of Albert Rougenant's A propos de la crise de l'Apprentissage (1911).

Also in liaison with the Zaragoza group Larramendi published a series of booklets under the common title En la Avanzada. Crítica política. Cuestiones vascas. Cinematógrafo (1911) exploited the revolution v. counterrevolution antinomy; touching upon the Basque subject, it defended provincial fueros but lambasted separatists. Catecismo á los ateos. ¿Qué son las escuelas laicas? Romanones, ¡á la barra! (1913) re-prnted earlier pamphlets and went on with new onslaught on secular education, based on outdated illusions of Rousseau. Finally, ¡Viva el Rey! Psicología social y literaria (1914) tackled major issues like monarchy, strikes, self-government and labor organization, though it also discussed literature. Apart from publications he did not neglect attending public meetings, delivering addresses across Spain at gatherings flavored with Carlism or social-Catholicism.

In the 1910s Carlism was increasingly paralyzed by internal crisis related to conflict between the claimant Don Jaime and the key party theorist, Juan Vázquez de Mella; both factions competed to control the Madrid-based semi-official Carlist daily, El Correo Español. Larramendi remained fully loyal to his king; moreover, as a lawyer he helped to transfer the newspaper ownership to marqués de Valldespina and to purge the editorial board from dissenters like Peñaflor. He confirmed his image of a loyal subject also during the 1914 elections. With propaganda campaign already in full swing, the party candidate in Vitoria, Esteban Bilbao, balked at the official plan and fielded his candidature in Durango; as emergency measure Larramendi was asked to replace him. It turned out he had little chance standing against the Conservative leader, Eduardo Dato, though following defeat he did not hesitate to appeal administrative pressure.

Carlist standard

In the late 1910s Larramendi was already recognized as an important figure in the party, though he did not rise to executive structures either nationwide or on the regional Castilian basis and was rather considered a young man for the future. The setting changed dramatically when following the end of World War I the claimant was released from his confinement in Austria and early 1919 arrived in Paris to reclaim party leadership from the Mellistas. The conflict exploded in expulsion of de Mella and massive defections of his supporters, many of them occupying key positions in Carlist structures; command chain of the party was decimated. Political delegate of the king in Spain, marqués de Cerralbo, resigned; he was only provisionally replaced by Pascual Comín, who upon appointment declared he was not prepared to stay at the helm longer than provisionally.

== Leader (1919-1921) ==
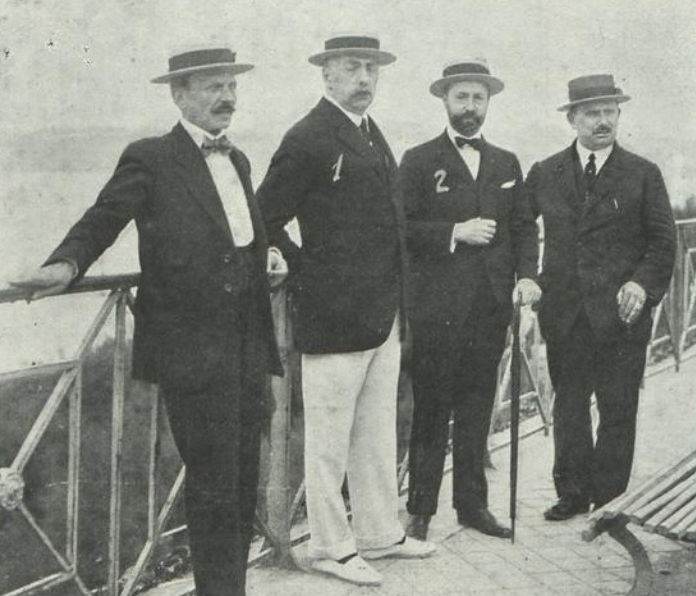
Larramendi and Don Jaime, 1919

Comín appreciated Larramendi following works of the Zaragoza group; he suggested that the Madrid lawyer becomes his replacement. Don Jaime acknowledged Larramendi's loyalty during the strife for control of El Correo. Moreover, as a young militant deprived of own political basis he seemed to have posed no threat to royal leadership; his location in Madrid and profession of a lawyer offered additional advantages. Lack of experience was a disadvantage; Melgar dissuaded the choice also due to pro-German Larramendi's leaning during the war. Don Jaime's special envoy to Madrid returned with good news and in August 1919 the claimant appointed Larramendi his key representative in Spain and effectively the party leader, though not with the title of Jefe Delegado, but as a Secretario General.

Larramendi faced an extremely difficult task of re-building command structures. He threw himself into a series of hectic meetings with provincial and regional leaders, incessantly touring the country; in some cases, like Catalonia or Valencia, he faced also bitter personal conflicts. Apart from that, as a lawyer he successfully kept fighting off the Mellistas when struggling for El Correo. His first major initiative was launching the project of a grand Carlist assembly; it materialized in November 1919 as Magna Junta de Biarritz. The event was a success as it consolidated the party and helped it to re-gain momentum, even though in none of 3 major issued debated - re-organization, financial problems and marriage of Don Jaime - any key decision was adopted.

In 1920 Larramendi focused mostly on engineering the Carlist electoral campaign; none of the scholarly sources consulted provides information on what strategy he adopted, though he is known to have angrily rejected veiled calls for a low-denomination Catholic right-wing alliance, advocated by emergent accidentalist Christian-Democratic groupings and their mouthpiece, El Debate. The campaign was an utter failure; 3 mandates secured was the worst result since the Carlists joined electoral competition in the early 1890s. Also personally Larramendi had to acknowledge defeat: running in the Navarrese district of Aoiz, for some 20 years almost an exclusive Carlist electoral fiefdom, he lost to a Conservative counter-candidate.

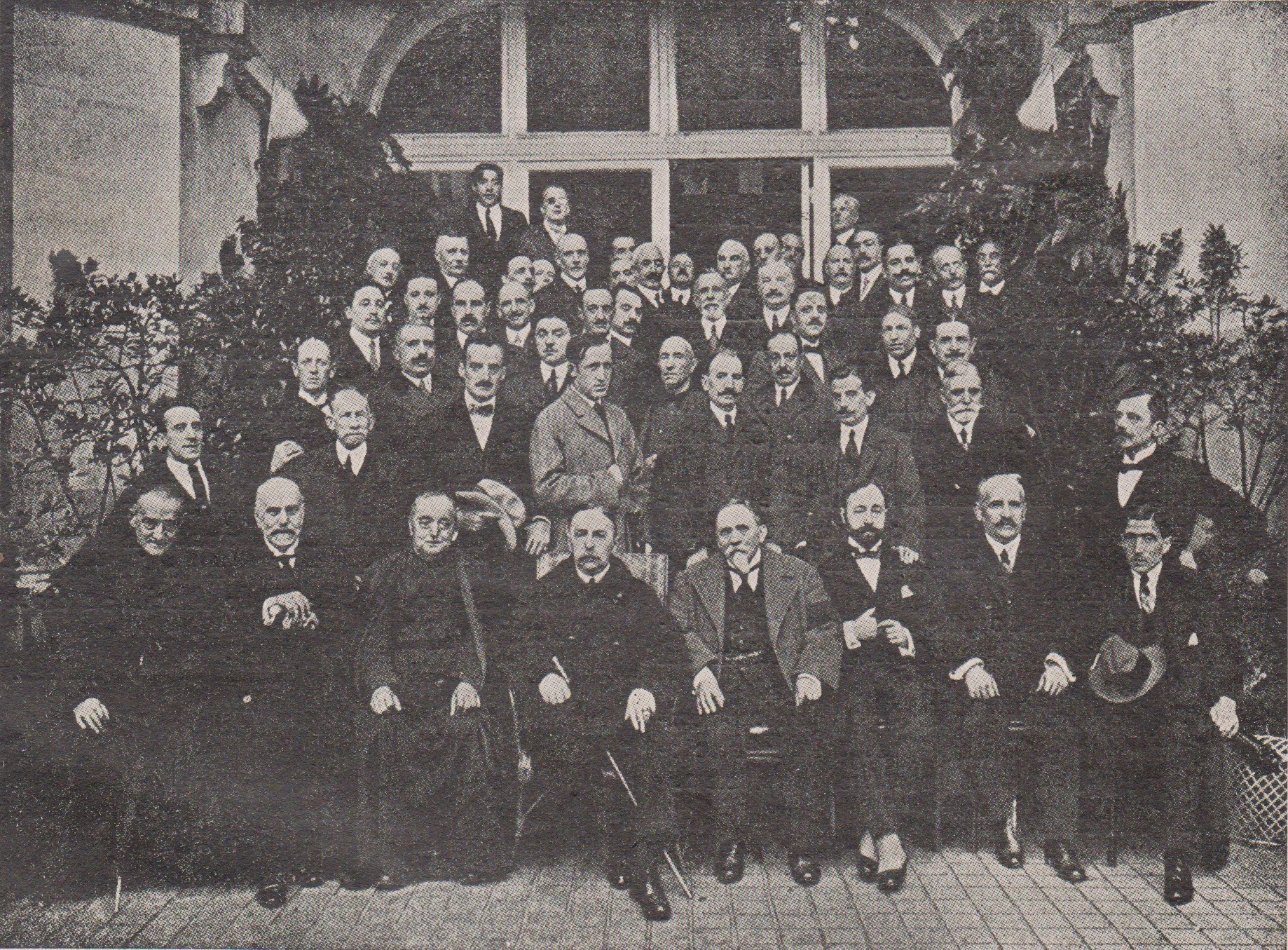
Junta de Biarritz

In 1921 Larramendi seemed already overwhelmed by mounting problems; another one were rumors about negotiations related to some sort of dynastic accord, allegedly conducted by Don Jaime with the Alfonsist branch; Larramendi has always been fiercely hostile to any compromise with the despised Liberal dynasty. He arranged for another grand meeting; it took place in Lourdes, though due to lower attendance and minor scale of discussions taking place it was rather an operational session than a milestone comparable to the Biarritz amassment; it provided Larramendi with little assistance. Soon afterwards the claimant left for Colombia with hardly any guidance or information passed to his delegate in Spain; upon his return, in the summer of 1921, Larramendi handed his resignation. When discussing its background, some scholars claim he was tired of uphill struggle; others point to talks with the Alfonsists and general Don Jaime's detachment or Larramendi's remorse about the 1920 electoral disaster.

== In the back seat (1921-1930) ==
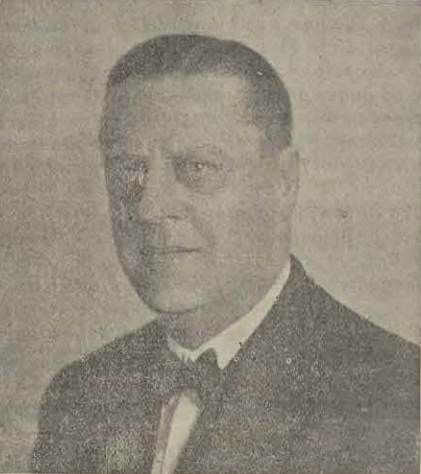
Marqués de Villores

Replaced as Carlist political leader by marqués de Villores, Larramendi remained engaged in the party executive; his activity was related to dynastical issues rather than to daily business. In 1922 he represented Don Jaime's sister, Doña Blanca, in court; wife to a member of the imperial Habsburg house she refused to recognize the Austrian republic and sought shelter in Spain. Larramendi presented her case when claiming the Spanish citizenship, resulting in a booklet titled Dictamen referente a la nacionalidad de S.A.R. Doña Blanca de Borbón y Borbón. His efforts were crowned with success and Doña Blanca with her family settled in Barcelona. In the future the episode would prove of great value for the Carloctavista dynastic claim, but no source clarifies whether in the early 1920s Larramendi considered her sons would-be claimants to the Spanish throne. It is confirmed, however, that he was acutely aware of the looming dynastical crisis. As Don Jaime, at that time in his early 50s, had no offspring, the Carlist branch was endangered with extinction. Larramendi kept advocating last-minute rescue mission by Don Jaime's marriage with his niece; the scheme crashed when in 1922 Fabiola Massimo married an Italian aristocrat.

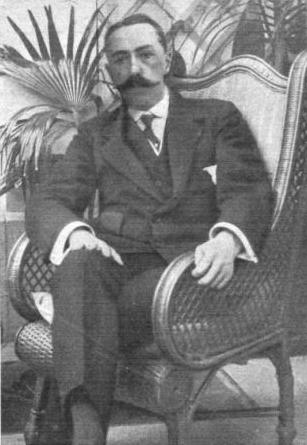
Don Jaime, Carlist king 1909-1931

The 1923 advent of Primo de Rivera dictatorship brought national political life to a standstill: all parties have been dissolved. It seems that initially Larramendi welcomed the coup as doing away with a long overdue liberal democracy and a stepping stone towards Traditionalist monarchy, position fairly popular among the Carlists; his friend, Víctor Pradera, wholeheartedly engaged in building the regime structures. In late 1924 Larramendi addressed the military directorate with a letter; it contained congratulations on "patriotic work" and offered personal services. Another letter denied lack of understanding for "movimiento regenerador de 13 de Septiembre"; written from clearly Jaimist positions, it praised the military for cracking down on caciquismo and bureaucracy, considered support for the government "most basic duty of a citizen" and even declared Alfonso XIII "más fecunda encarnación de España".

It seems that in the mid-1920s Larramendi's lukewarm approval turned into disappointment, still in line with official line adopted by Don Jaime. He could not understand how Rodezno, his juvenile acquaintance of love-and-hate relationship, could have accepted the Villafranca mayorship "given the circumstances"; by his son he was recollected as opposed to Primo and refusing to join either Unión Patriótica or any other primoderiverista structure. Indeed, in the late 1920s he was recorded mostly as active in the Catholic realm, giving lectures and once assigned a somewhat ambiguous praise of "Ganivet Católico". Though in 1930 he took part in Catholic political initiatives of strongly accidentalist leaning, like the Salamanca gathering with Gil-Robles and Herrera Oria, he stood firmly by monarchist views, also during confusion of the last months of the monarchy, at times attracting fire from the young Jaimist hot-heads.

== On the rise again (1931-1934) ==
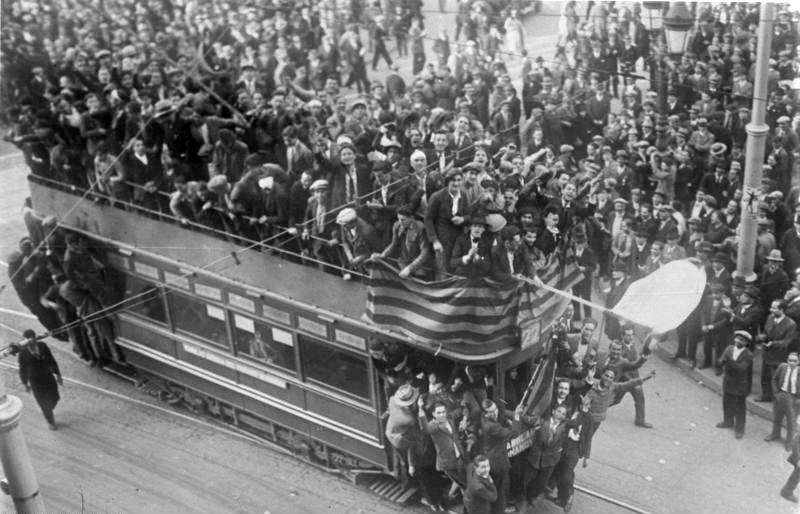
Republic declared, 1931

From his Calle de Velázquez apartment Larramendi watched revolutionary masses ruling the streets of Madrid during declaration of the Republic in April 1931 and soon afterwards the smoke of burning churches during Quema de Conventos in May. Amongst bewilderment of the Right he decided to defend the monarchist cause standing in the forthcoming Cortes elections as a Jaimist candidate in Madrid. His campaign confronted the anti-clerical and anti-religious tide head on: Larramendi referred to the Church as to a truly popular structure, with priests and friars "la sangre del pueblo más humilde de España". With his propaganda machine reduced to some 30 members of the Madrid Círculo Jaimista he gathered some 7,500 votes, compared to 134,000 votes for the leading candidate and 36,000 for the last candidate elected.

During the summer Larramendi launched a new periodical, Criterio. Revista Semanal de Orientación Política y Literaria. Some authors claim he was one of key people behind it, others name him manager of the weekly, which represented "most combative Carlism". In late 1931 and early 1932 Criterio was enthusiastically supporting unification of three Traditionalist branches in Comunión Tradicionalista, though it remained a private enterprise. It attracted a few known names like Pradera, Pemán and Albiñana, but in August closed due to financial problems. Larramendi engaged also in Traditionalist propaganda meetings, at times featured among the party pundits. In late 1932 and across 1933 his activity became intense and there was hardly a month without a press note on his public harangues; in June 1933 he defended in court generals accused of taking part in Sanjurjada.

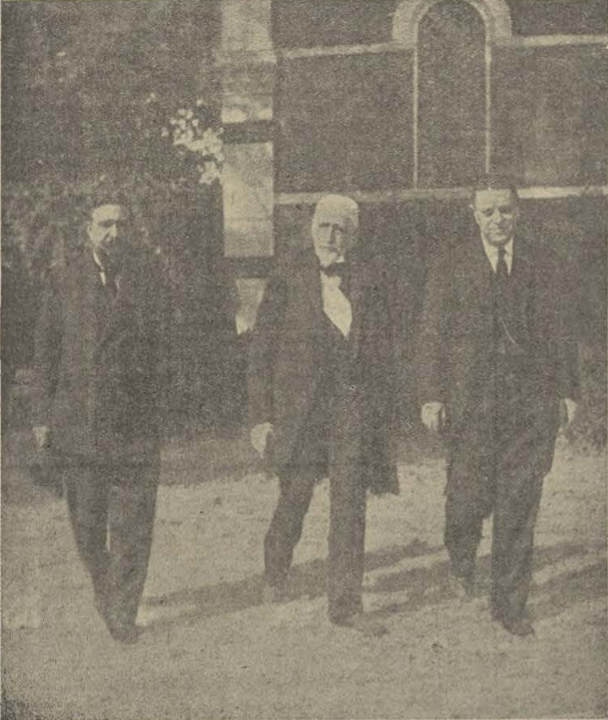
Alfonso Carlos (middle)

Though recognized in the movement as one its former leader and one of the most experienced militants, during the early 1930s he did not count among top Carlist executive. His relations with the new party leader Rodezno have always been ambiguous; in the 1930s they were aggravated by differences on policy versus the Alfonsists; unlike Rodezno, Larramendi was as usual vehemently opposed to compromising intransigent Carlist stand and averse to entering Bloque Nacional. He claimed that an alliance would turn 100 years of Carlist history, including 80,000 men who gave lives for their king, into a comedy; moreover, such an ambiguous coalition would merely weaken the only force capable of confronting the revolution, namely Traditionalism.

During gear-up to the 1933 electoral campaignn he was overruled by Rodezno, who pushed for a joint far-Right alliance. Larramendi decided to comply and agreed to stand as a sole Traditionalist candidate on a joint "Coalición antimarxista" list in Madrid. The campaign in general was a triumph of the Right, but in the urban Madrid constituency PSOE retained its dominant position and Larramendi, though attracted 130,000 votes, failed again. Despite the defeat suffered, he continued with intense propaganda activity, which in the mid-1930 became nothing less than hectic. There were periods when hardly a week passed by without his public appearance noted in the press, the Traditionalist one hailing him as "elocuente orador".

== Back in the executive (1934-1937) ==
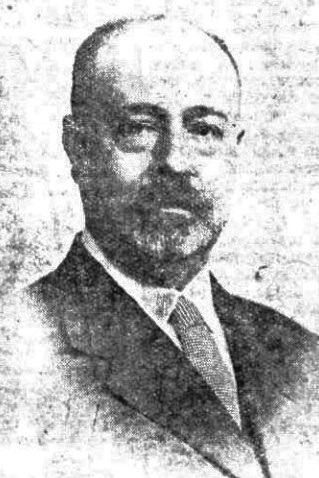
Larramendi, mid-1930s

In 1934 Rodezno was replaced as the Carlist leader by Manuel Fal Conde; the new setting suited Larramendi more, and he soon started to assume high positions within the party structures. In 1934 he was appointed to Consejo de Cultura, a decorative body entrusted with disseminating Traditionalist thought. More important was his 1935 nomination to Consejo de Comunión Tradicionalista, set up as a collective executive supposed to assist Fal. Fully aligned with the leader, Larramendi went on lambasting any conservative compromise and kept voicing against new far-Right coalitions.

A penchant for accord with the Alfonsinos, demonstrated by some Carlists, stemmed from a looming dynastical crisis; the claimant Don Alfonso Carlos was an octogenarian and there was no clear successor in sight. Larramendi was leaning towards the deposed Portuguese Braganza family, pointing to Duarte Nuño as to a potential Carlist successor. However, later he got converted to a regentialist solution. In early 1936 it was Larramendi, considered totally loyal and an excellent lawyer, who edited the royal decree of Alfonso Carlos; it nominated Don Javier as the future Carlist regent. As authority he wrote prologue to Historia critica del tradicionalismo español of Benedicio Torralba de Damas. His vital role was reflected in the 1936 electoral campaign, when together with Fal he negotiated a failed deal with Gil-Robles. For unclear reasons he ran in Gerona; his name sounded strange among Catalan candidates though it was Frente Popular triumph which contributed to his next electoral failure. Last but not least, as an abogado he kept defending Carlists before the Republican courts.

It is not clear whether Larramendi was aware of Carlist gear-up to the 1936 coup. In early July with half of his children he moved to the usual family summer location in San Sebastián; his wife and remaining children joined him on 14 July. When learning about the rising in Morocco he noted „todo estaba perdido”, probably reflecting his mistrust towards the military. Since in Gipuzkoa the insurgency failed, as a safety measure he moved to a nearby hotel, but on 20 July left the city and made it on foot to Navarre, already controlled by the Carlists. In September, together with the victorious Requeté, he returned to San Sebastián and commenced editing a new Carlist periodical, La Voz de España; he is also noted as helping some PNV activists to flee.

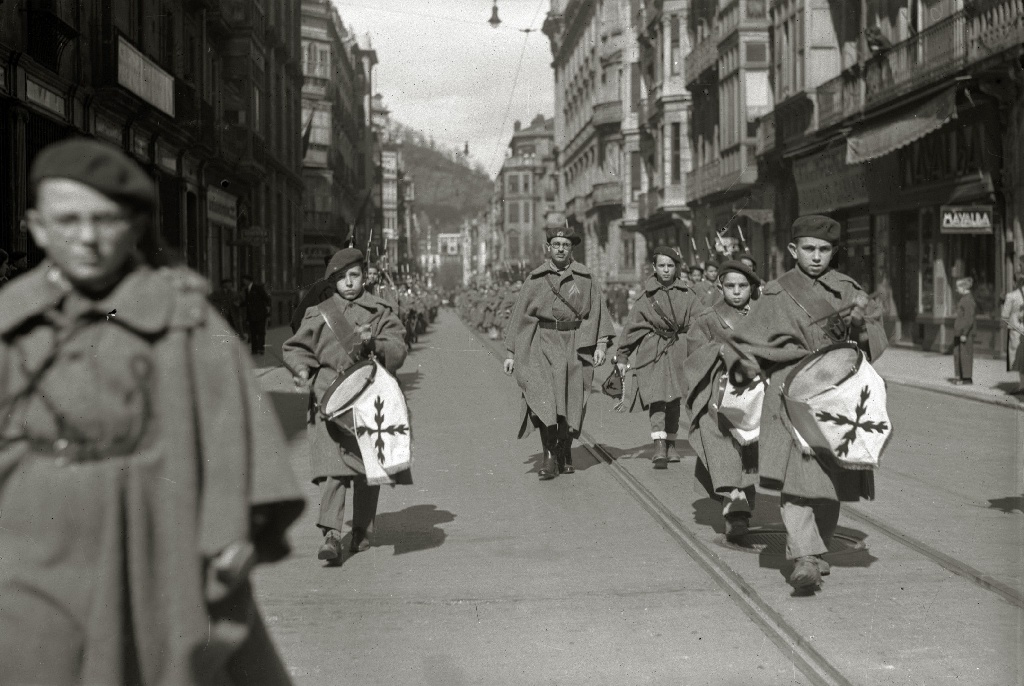
Carlists in Donostia, 1937

Larramendi did not enter any of the wartime Carlist ruling bodies, though he remained among close collaborators of Don Javier. Already in late 1936 he voiced against Falangist drive for power; when unification within a state party became a burning issue in early 1937 he tended to skepticism. He was present during a meeting of Carlist executive in Insua, but there is little data on his stance. It seems that like most Traditionalist leaders he was disoriented; the only information available is that he insisted on clear war objectives. The Insua meeting was his last appearance amongst the party leaders before the Unification Decree was announced.

== Reclusive and patriarch (after 1937) ==
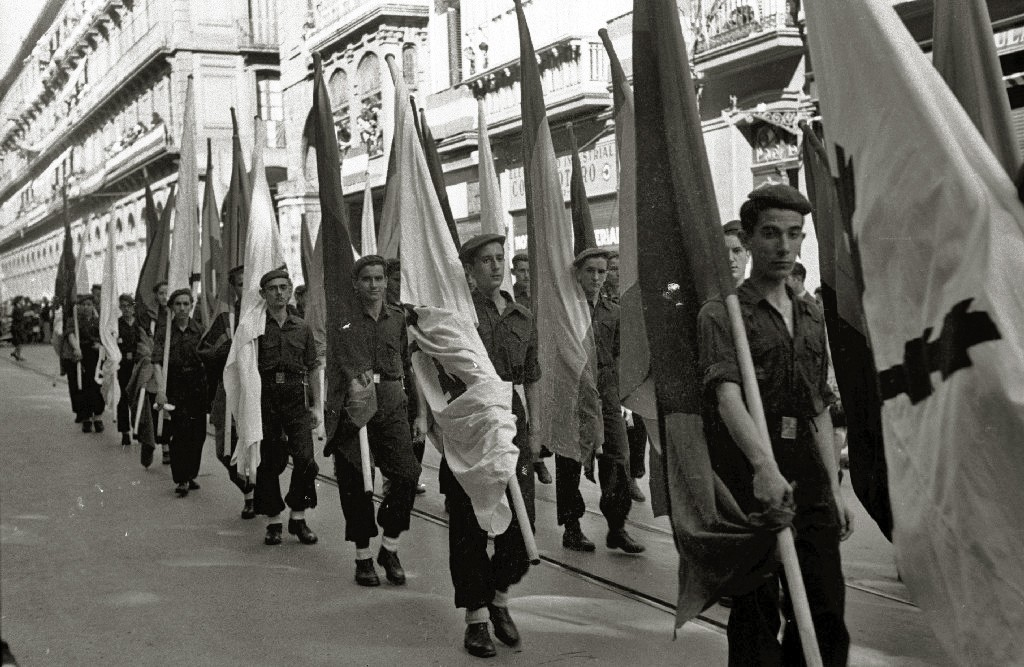
Carlists on Francoist parade, 1940s

Larramendi refused to join Francoist structures and criticized those who did; he verbally assaulted Julio Muñoz Aguilar, co-editor from La Voz de España, for an article supporting Franco. In 1937 he closed himself for a month in a San Sebastián hotel and wrote El sistema tradicional. The work was an orthodox lecture of political Traditionalism, stemming from assumption that traditionalist system does not need to be implemented: it exists as a natural phenomenon. It is not clear whether Larramendi hoped to get the work published; it was not possible before 1952, when it went to print as Cristiandad, Tradición y Realeza. In 1938 he agreed that two of his sons, aged 17 and 16, enlist to Requeté.

In 1939 Larramendi returned to Madrid, still in touch with Don Javier. In 1940 the Alfonsist heir, Don Juan, addressed the regent with a letter, seeking dynastic concord; Larramendi made sure the response was as harsh and uncompromising as possible. He remained a central figure among Madrid Traditionalists and supplied party youth bulletins, issued by semi-clandestine AET, with his articles. Though falling short of openly anti-Francoist language, they constituted a call for loyalty to Carlism, during its history "exonerado, proscrito, confiscado en prisiones, fusilado, asesinado, perseguido, traicionado, calumniado, silenciado, y vendido durante más de un siglo, dado por muerte mil veces", but remaining "tradición inmarcesible de la España eterna". He took part in public Carlist events, tolerated by the regime, e.g. the annual Fiesta de los Mártires de la Tradición or funerals of Carlist leaders.

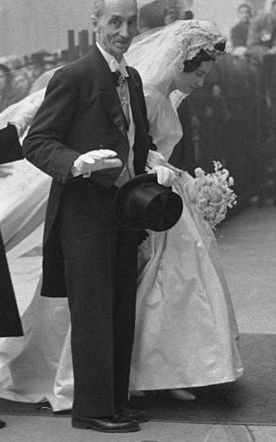
Don Javier, Carlist regent and king, 1936-1975

On the practical side, Larramendi resumed his career of a lawyer. The number of his customers decreased as they realized that the new political setting provided him with neither political influence nor any other benefits. He continued serving some of the older clientele, e.g. in the 1940s fighting legal battles related to heritage and last will of a Carlist aristocrat, barón de Sangarren.

In the late 1940s Larramendi, at that time almost 70, acquired the status of Carlist moral authority if not a movement's patriarch. He was aging quickly; in the 1950s he suffered heavily from arteriosclerosis and loss of sight, gradually turning almost blind. Nevertheless, he remained engaged in internal politics and counted among those who advocated termination of the regency, to be replaced with personal claim of Don Javier. In 1952 he presided over the Consejo Nacional de la Tradición meeting, discussing how it should be advanced; for health reasons he did not attend the Eucharistic Congress in Barcelona, where Don Javier was effectively introduced as a king. In 1955 Larramendi met his monarch for the last time. When in the mid-1950s the intransigent Carlist opposition to Franco came under fire as inefficient and counter-productive, Larramendi kept protesting a would-be rapprochement. Some scholars claim that in 1956 he was nominated to a new Carlist executive, Secretariado General; this is not impossible, as at that time Larramendi was sort of a Carlist living saint; however, others point rather to his son, Ignacio.

== Reception and legacy ==
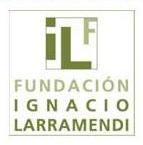
Fundacion Ignacio Larramendi logotype

It seems that despite his longtime presence among top Carlist political strata, Larramendi generated little personal antagonism; cases of open challenge are scarce and seem to be rather circumstantial, while there is evidence of respect even among the most die-hard Carlist enemies, the Anarchists. Following death he was gradually falling into oblivion; the popular Madrid daily ABC mentioned him for the first time in 1982, in a commemorative article by his grandson. It was only in the late 1980s that his name started to circulate widely in public discourse, all thanks to Fundación Hernando de Larramendi, set up by his son in 1986. Its declared mission is to promote "caridad en las relaciones sociales" in line with the Catholic teaching, to act as independent think-tank, to study history of Carlism and to support non-commercial scientific research; its most visible activities are those related to dissemination of Traditionalist thought and promotion of Carlist studies. The foundation honors Larramendi's name in editorial series, titled Colección Luis Hernando de Larramendi, and in awards in history of Carlism, named Premio Internacional de Historia del Carlismo Luis Hernando de Larramendi.

Luis Hernando de Larramendi gained no dedicated scholarly work; the closest thing to a monograph are chapters dedicated to his father by Ignacio Hernando de Larramendi in his book, Así se hizo MAPFRE (2000). Though highly hagiographic, they provide the most detailed information available so far. Apart from well-known facts from his political career, the chapters offer also lots of private observations and recollections; they paint a picture of a Catholic taking communion almost every day, a profoundly idealist person, extremely sensitive to any sort of injustice and unrepentant in his political creed, but incapable of violence. Though humble and unpretentious, he is also portrayed as intolerant versus foolishness; this trait is considered moral defect, though also an obstacle in Larramendi's professional and political career. Tending to solitude, he ran his law office on his own and was getting outpaced by modern legal companies; in terms of politics he built no personal following, relying entirely on his loyalty to the dynasty and trust in Traditionalist doctrine.

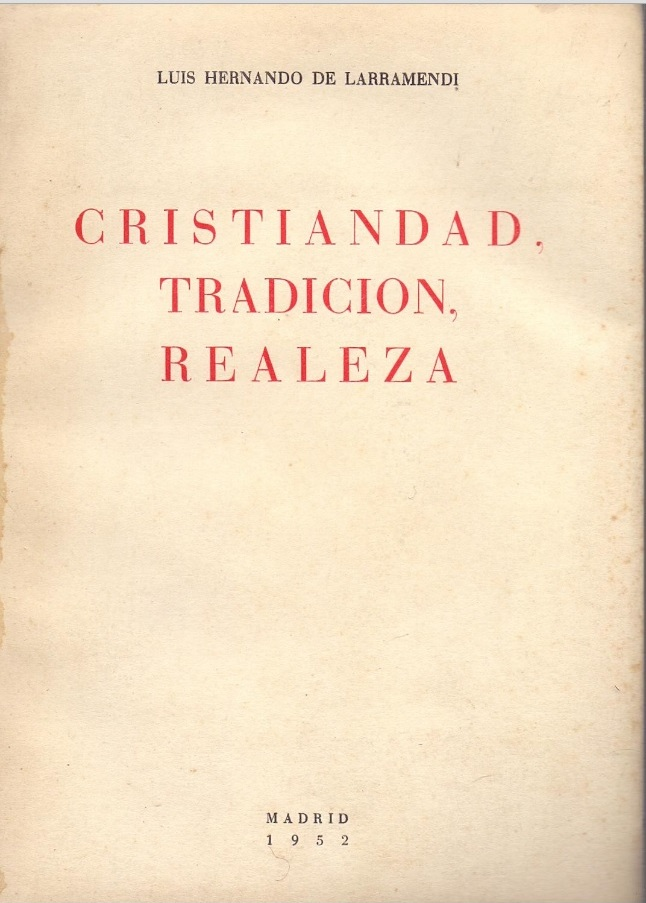
El sistema tradicional, published as Cristiandad, Tradición, Realeza

In Carlist historiography Larramendi is treated briefly, usually when discussing his 1919-1921 leadership tenure and the 1936 decree of Don Alfonso Carlos. In history of political thought his written opus, El sistema tradicional, went largely unnoticed and is not discussed in Spain. Abroad Larramendi has been acknowledged as important, though not a first-row thinker, noted rather for his legal dynastic reading. His son presented El sistema in sequence of great theoretical works, following those of Gil Robles, Vázquez de Mella and Pradera, and preceding those of Elías de Tejada and Gambra. He is portrayed as sworn Christian counter-revolutionary, concerned with justice in general and protection of the weak in particular. The enemy of democracy founded on universal suffrage, he embraced the vision of Catholic monarchy, based on traditional social establishments and organic representation.

== See also ==
- Carlism
- Ignacio Hernando de Larramendi y Montiano
- Don Jaime
- Don Alfonso Carlos
- Don Javier
