= Ignacio Hernando de Larramendi y Montiano =

Spanish entrepreneur, Carlist militant and author

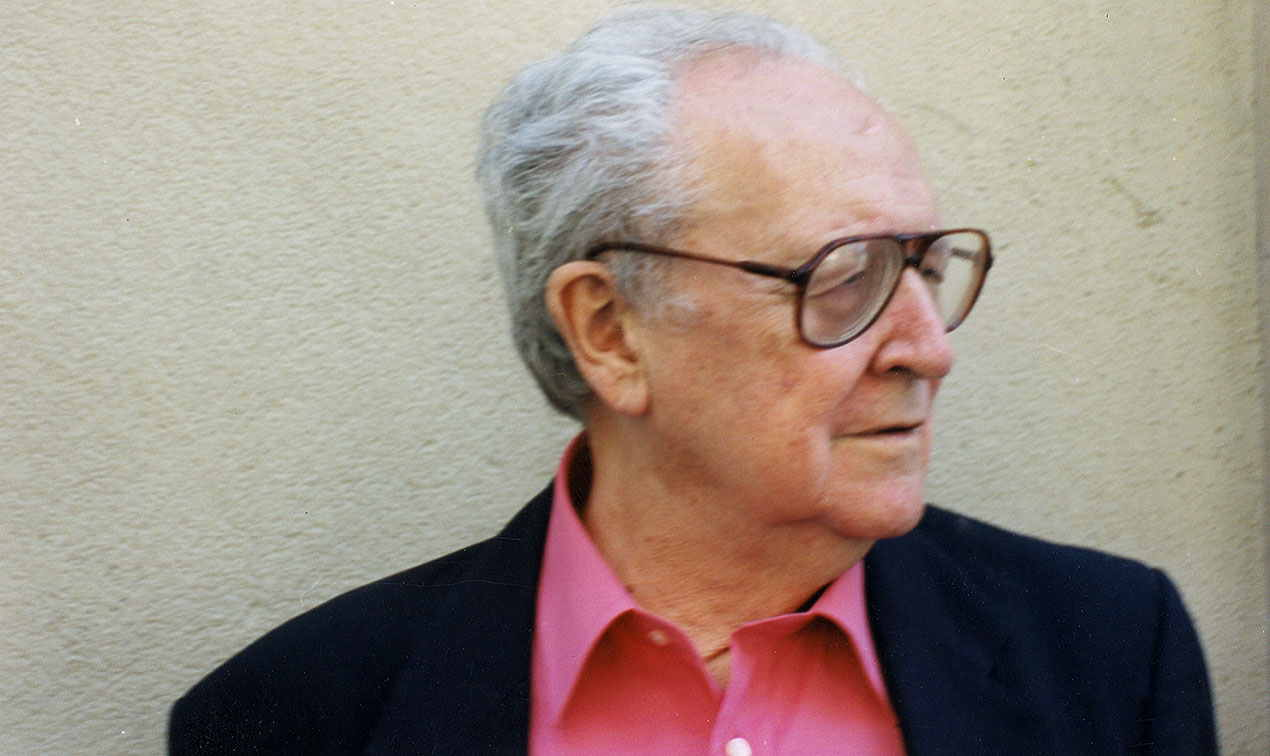
- Born: Ignacio Hernando de Larramendi y Montiano; 1921; Madrid, Spain
- Died: 2001 (aged 79–80); Madrid, Spain
- Occupation: Business manager
- Known for: Entrepreneur
- Political party: Carlism

Ignacio Hernando de Larramendi y Montiano (1921–2001) was a Spanish militant, Carlist, businessman, and author. Larramendi was the longtime head of the Spanish multinational insurance company MAPFRE and was the sponsor and organiser of multiple initiatives related to Hispanic culture, mostly in Latin America. In politics he briefly rose to become a Carlist executive, but is better known for his promotion of Traditionalist heritage.

He and his wife Lourdes Martínez Gutiérrez (1924–2015) had nine children together.

== Family and youth ==
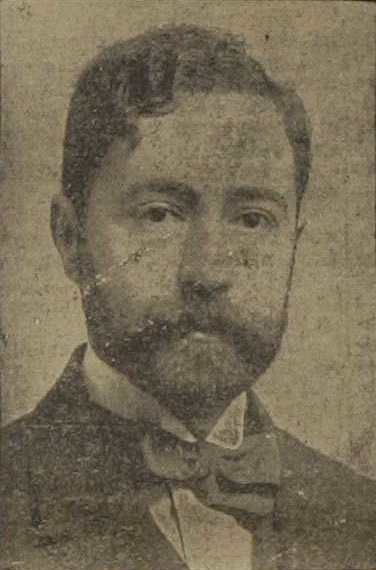
Luis Hernando de Larramendi

Larramendi's ancestors on both sides of the family were members of Basque nobility. His paternal grandfather Mariano Hernando was an art merchant, and Larramendi's father Luis Hernando de Larramendi (1882–1957) was a lawyer in Madrid. A Carlist activist and unsuccessful candidate to the Cortes, Luis briefly grew to be a political leader of Jaimismo in 1919–1921, and in the mid-1930s he joined the party executive and remained on good terms with the Carlist claimant to the Spanish throne, Prince Jaime, Duke of Anjou and Madrid. During the Spanish Civil War he refused to comply with the Unification Decree and withdrew from politics, although he passed on his penchant for social issues to his sons.

Larramendi's mother María de Montiano y Uriarte (1886–1976) counted Manuel de Montiano and Agustin de Montiano among her ancestors. But her father was an untitled Bilbao physician, and so her birth family partially lived by selling off family estates. Considered the most handsome girl in the city, she was also fanatically Basque.

Larramendi's parents lived in Madrid at Calle Velázquez where they raised their nine children, all brought up in a fervently Catholic ambience. As Larramendi was initially educated at home he only entered Colegio de Nuestra Señora de Pilar in 1932, and had not completed the curriculum when the Spanish Civil War broke out while the family was at their usual summer holiday location in San Sebastián. Larramendi's father Luis escaped to the Nationalist zone, only to return a few weeks later when the Carlist Requeté paramilitary seized the city.

Larramendi continued his schooling in the Marianist Colegio de Santa María, obtaining his bachillerato in 1937 and then enlisting in an auxiliary Requeté formation in Fuenterrabía, serving as a prison guard. Together with his brother, and with the hesitant consent of their parents, in July 1938 he was accepted into 2. Compaña de Radio Requeté. But following a conflict with the commander of the unit in early 1939 he moved to Compañia de Tolosa in the Gipuzkoan Tercio San Miguel. Experiencing no major combat, the battalion advanced through Catalonia to the French frontier, shuttled to Extremadura in late winter, and after low-intensity skirmishes reached the province of Toledo at the moment of final Nationalist victory.

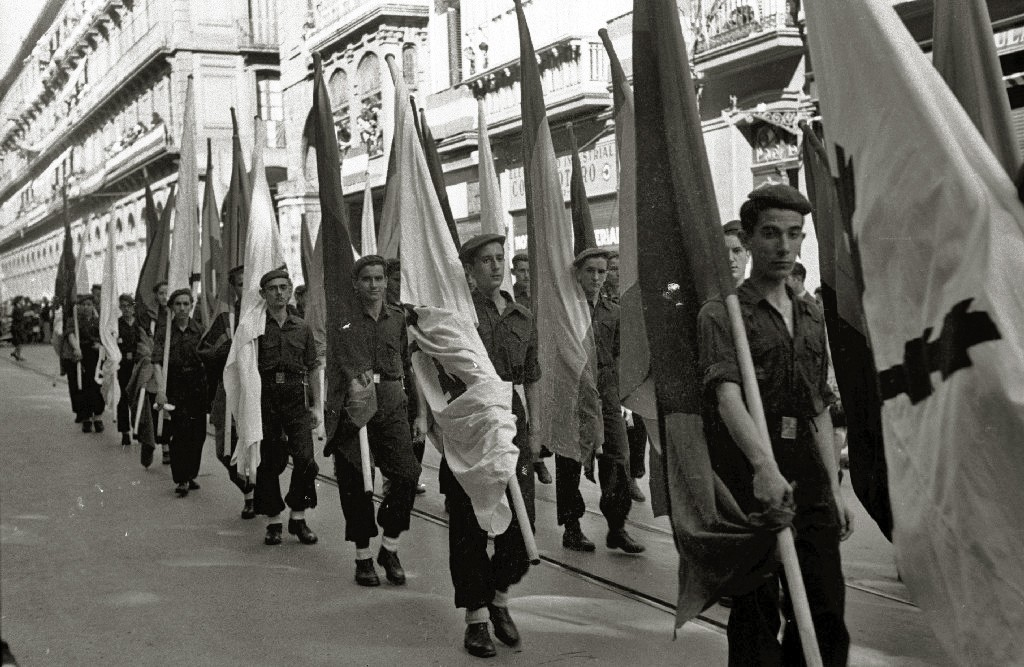
Requetés on parade

In 1939 Larramendi commenced studying law in Madrid, graduating in 1941. Though initially intending to be a lawyer, in 1944 he was employed at Dirección General de Seguros, a state insurance regulatory body. He had been dating Lourdes Martínez Gutiérrez (1924–2015) since 1940. The granddaughter of general Alfredo Gutiérrez Chaume, her father, a "funcionario de Hacienda" (treasury official), died early. The couple married in 1950 and had nine children between 1951 and 1965. The best known of them is Ramón Hernando de Larramendi, widely recognised in Spain as a polar explorer. Larramendi's son Luis succeeded his father in business and in politics, rising to high positions within Carlist structures and supporting a number of Traditionalist activities. Larramendi's son Miguel is known as a professor of Arabic studies in Madrid, and his daughter Margarita is a poet and scholar in linguistics.

== Early politics ==
Carlist standard

Larramendi was involved in politics from as young as the age of ten, distributing Carlist electoral leaflets for his father in 1931. In addition to his participation in Requeté during the Civil War, he engaged in a Carlist student organization called Agrupación Escolar Tradicionalista (AET), mocking himself by claiming to be the president of its Madrid branch in exile. Having returned to the capital he engaged in local AET organisation and emerged as one of its most active leaders. Together with a group of similarly minded peers, including Rafael Gambra and Francisco Elías de Tejada, he staged minor and semi-private anti-Francoist demonstrations, at one point in 1942 being detained and placed under security supervision. The AET's most notable activity was the Academia Vázquez de Mella, a Carlist-flavoured private educational initiative of Maximo Palomar, with Larramendi's experience there reinforcing his penchant for social issues, and for the cultural rather than the political dimension of Traditionalism.

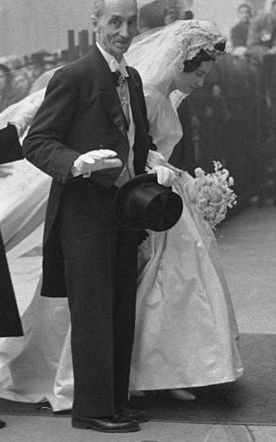
Don Javier at the wedding of his daughter, 1960

Following the demise of the Academia in the mid-1940s, internal political and dynastical fragmentation contributed to the dissolution of the Carlist movement, resulting in there being no official or semi-official Carlist structure in Madrid. Influenced by Elías de Tejada and own father, Larramendi tended to favor Dom Duarte and the Braganzas as the most legitimate candidates to the throne during this period. But following the moderately successful launch of his own publishing house in 1951 – the Traditionalist-leaning Editorial Cálamo – in the early 1950s he converted to supporting the Borbón-Parmas and became known in the movement as a young, vehement anti-Francoist and a dynastically loyal militant. As such, he was counted among the intransigent followers of the official Carlist leader Manuel Fal Conde – the so-called Falcondistas – although he did not rise to the top layers of the movement, as demonstrated by him not being listed among those attending the first royal presentation of the claimant Don Javier in Barcelona in 1952.

However, his father's position among those engineering the launch of Don Javier's campaign helped Larramendi enter the Carlist ruling circles of the era. In the mid-1950s he was considered a member of the "duros" or "guipúzcoanos", an internal faction grumbling at the official party line as constituting a yielding to Franco, although he was also considered a member of the "intellectuals" faction and hence opposed to the "integrist" group of Manuel Fal Conde. As the Carlist internal crisis came to a climax in the mid-1950s, Fal was forced to resign and Vasco-Navarros suggested that Larramendi be appointed to the Secretariado Político, a freshly created body supposed to assist the new leader José María Valiente. The plan was to push hard with Don Javier's royal claim, but the new party executive was dominated by supporters of a less intransigent collaborationist offer to Franco, and the plan backfired. When the new Secretariat presented the Francoist Falange with a proposal for joint action, Larramendi resigned, his career in the executive thus ending after just a few months.

== Later politics ==
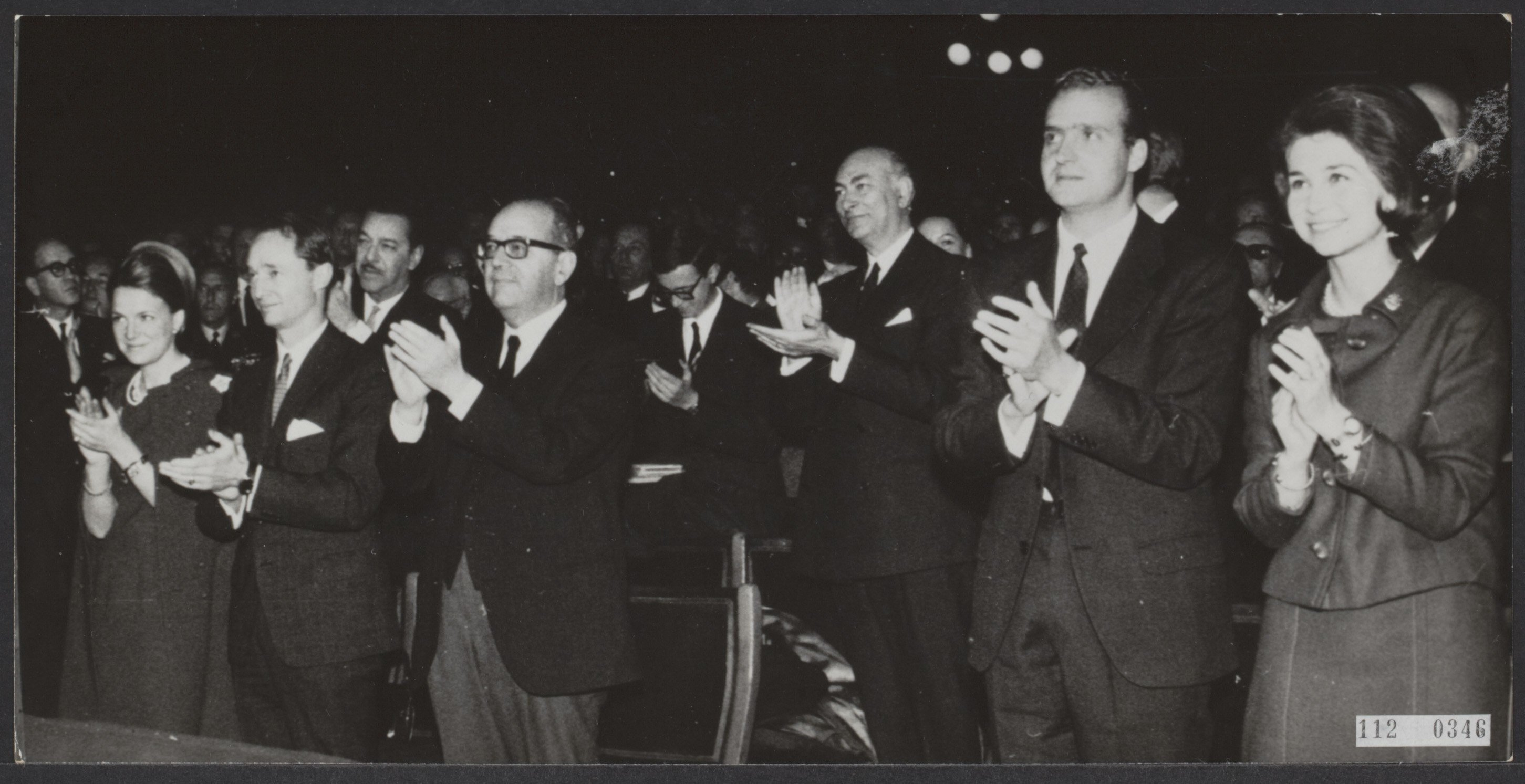
Carlist and Alfonsist supporters and their wives, 1966

After his resignation Larramendi still remained active in Carlist circles and took part in their public initiatives. During the 1957 annual Carlist Montejurra gathering he was among the party pundits who introduced an heir to the throne, Don Carlos Hugo, although Larramendi remained somewhat sceptical and anxious that the prince might be tempted to pursue a collaborationist line. That same year Larramendi was vital in fomenting dissent in the Madrid AET, which deposed its leader and key Don Carlos Hugo promoter Ramón Massó on the grounds that he had compromised Traditionalist identity and advocated rapprochement with the regime.

In the late 1950s Larramendi's work with Carlist structures in Madrid required collaboration with the personal entourage of the prince Don Carlos Hugo, who had set up his headquarters in the capital. Differences of opinion occurred and gave rise to two factions, pro-collaborationists and anti-collaborationists. Massó, now leader of the pro-collaborationist faction and an acquaintance of Larramendi's from the Academia years, considered Larramendi a representative of "mas pura ortodoxia tradicionalista" (trans: "pure orthodox traditionalism").

In the early 1960s Larramendi frequented Montejurra annually with his sons rather than the official executive. By the mid-1960s his engagement in party life was very loose, especially after his friends Gambra and Elías broke with Comunión Tradicionalista in 1963 because it was assuming an increasingly unorthodox stance. When the conflict climaxed in the late 1960s Larramendi was a witness rather than a participant. As Hugocarlistas traded their pro-Falangist penchant for an anti-Francoism, Larramendi's earlier concerns faded away, to be replaced with anxiety about the prince's Marxist turn. However, his loyalty to the Bourbon dynasty remained, and shortly before Don Javier's expulsion in 1969 Larramendi hosted his king in his Madrid Villa Covadonga residence.

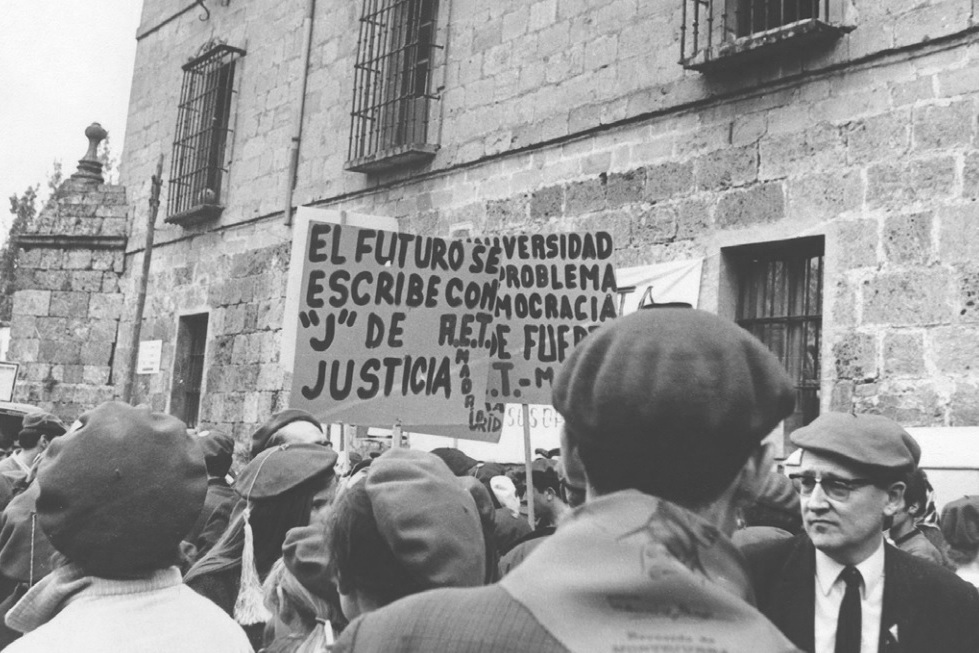
Larramendi (bottom-right corner) at a Montejurra gathering, 1960s

In 1970, when the Hugocarlista domination was not yet complete, the Partido Carlista branch in Madrid nominated Larramendi to take part in a gathering in Arbonne, styled as a would-be platform for compromise between the Progressives and the Traditionalists. Considered a representative of the Traditionalists but not involved in the internal party struggle, he seemed an in-between delegate and indeed adopted a conciliatory stance. Larramendi declared that if the party was to embrace socialist ideas its members should act instead of talking, and that he would start with himself. His point was actually about his position as a corporate business leader, but most of those present took it as support for Don Carlos Hugo. They were soon proven wrong. Larramendi stayed out of the newly emergent Partido Carlista and in 1975 addressed his king, Don Javier, with an ultimatum in the form of a joint letter, demanding confirmation of Traditionalist principles. When Don Javier abdicated in favor of his son, the Traditionalists addressed Don Carlos Hugo with another letter. But Larramendi was not among the signatories of this nor the following document, marking a final break with the new claimant. In the mid-1970s he loosely associated with Prince Sixtus Henry of Bourbon-Parma, but refrained from political activity after the death of Franco.

== MAPFRE: domestic market leader ==
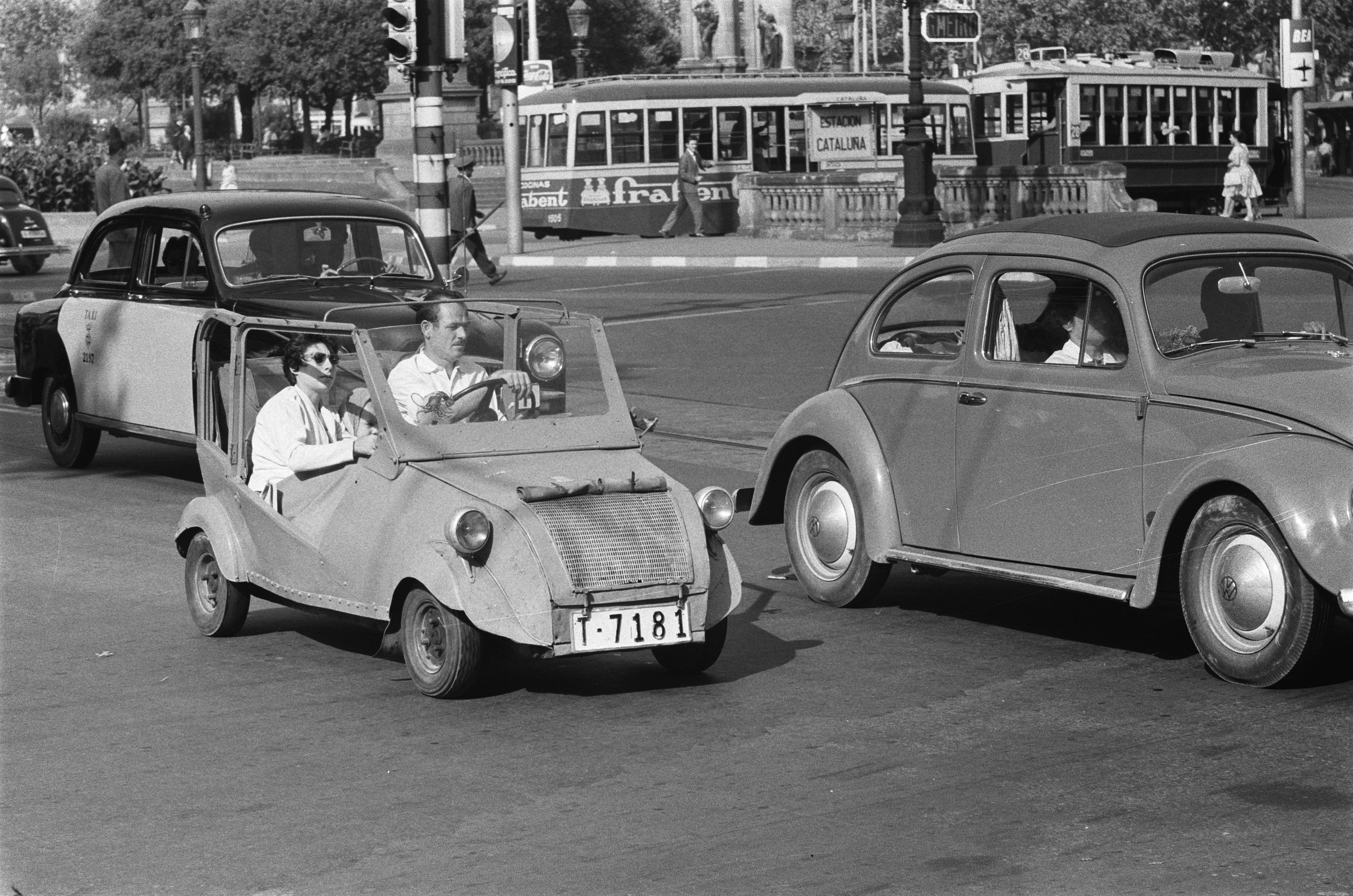
Urban traffic in Spain, 1960

After stints at insurance companies Dirección de Seguros in Madrid and Royal Insurance Company in London in the early 1950s, in 1955 Larramendi joined Mutua Patronal de Accidentes de Trabajo (trans: Employers' Work Accidents Insurance; known as "MAPFRE", and sometimes "Mapfre"), a mid-size policyholder-owned risk compensation company, or "mutual". The company was on the verge of bankruptcy, and as the new director general Larramendi was tasked with introducing a cost-cutting program. He renegotiated the period of a long-term debt repayment with Consejo General de Colegios de Farmacéuticos de España, closed branches, and streamlined ongoing operations, resulting in the company becoming profitable in the late 1950s. By the end of the decade Larramendi was in a position to design new growth schemes for MAPFRE.

In the early 1960s he pushed for developing a financial arm that could merge insurance with credit in a combined offer to car buyers. He accomplished this in 1962 by taking over Central de Obras y Crédito, and the resulting financial offerings proved successful with the rapidly growing Spanish car market. Another rewarding strategic move was creating Muinsa, an investment trust company designed to find ways around restrictive regulations limiting the investment activity of insurance companies. Other specialised companies such as Muinsa Dos, Progesa,and Mapinco soon followed, and in the late 1960s the mutual MAPFRE started to reformat some of its structures into joint-stock organizations.

In 1970 Larramendi implemented his first major corporate shake-up, in which Mutua – which targeted mostly the transport market – controlled Gama (short for "MAPFRE Group"), which in turn oversaw MAPFRE Industrial and MAPFRE Vida, specialising in the business and consumer sectors respectively. This structure allowed the sharing of common back office services while retaining autonomy and accountability for the diversified constituent companies, and with car sales booming in the early 1970s the group became market leader in the car insurance market. Larramendi's position as CEO became so strong that when a conflict arose in 1972 between him and the chairman of the board, it was the latter who resigned. And in 1975 his own formal role changed from director general to consejero delegado, enabling him to remain the key and dominating corporate personality in the group of companies.

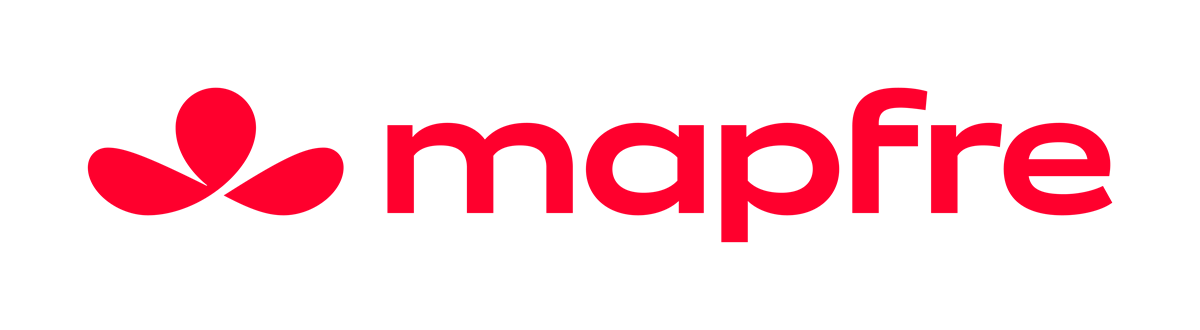
MAPFRE logotype

Both Spain and MAPFRE were affected by the mid-1970s crisis period in the world economy. Larramendi responded with another reorganisation, creating Corporación MAPFRE in 1978 as a holding structure, reducing stakes in controlled companies, and moving fully to the joint-stock formula. The scheme proved transitional and in 1983 was followed by the launch of Sistema MAPFRE 85 with Mutua at its centre and Corporación MAPFRE controlling all the daughter companies. The group now specialised in three areas – transport, various risks and life, and re-insurance – and once the crisis period ended the group retained its dynamism to the extent that in 1983 MAPFRE became the market leader on the Spanish insurance market.

== MAPFRE: international expansion ==
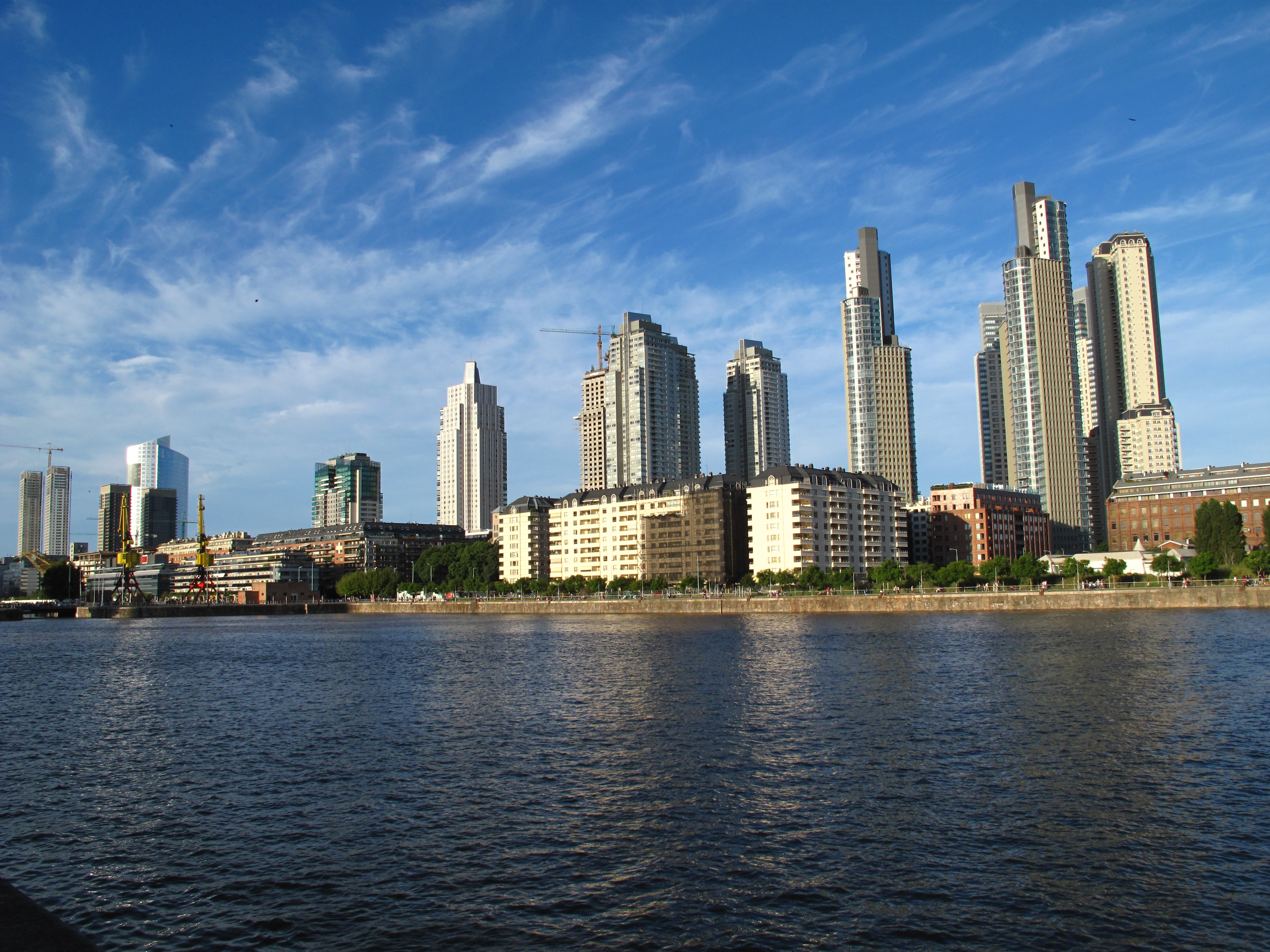
Buenos Aires business centre

By 1969 Larramendi had convinced MAPFRE to expand beyond Spain. Although a number of possibilities were considered Larramendi had his sights set on Latin America from the start. In the early 1970s Editorial MAPFRE embarked on a public relations campaign on behalf of the company while Larramendi toured South America himself, confirming that Argentina was the most promising market and that Colombia was the "mas españolista" (trans: "more Spanish nationalist") country.

By the late 1970s the company was looking for the most appropriate expansion formula. On the one hand it set up MAPFRE Internacional in 1976 and directly entered many South American markets. On the other it formed re-insurance conglomerates with Belgian and Dutch companies. But neither of these strategies really worked. The most successful strategy was to take over local entities and use re-insurance as a ram to enter local markets. Following acquisitions of Seguros Caribe in Colombia, Aconcagua in Argentina, and other companies, MAPFRE became a major player on the continent in the late 1980s, and its swift response to the 1985 Mexico earthquake earned the group prestige and recognition. In 1998 the company became the overall re-insurance market leader in Latin America and the leader among foreign insurance companies in Latin America in general. And while MAPFRE had operated through ten companies in the Latin American market before 1990, after that date it was twenty-two.

During Larramendi's tenure MAPFRE failed to develop substantial business in Europe. Following market simulations it was agreed that though the company was a key player in Spain it was not in a position to engage in full scale competition with larger German, Dutch, or French conglomerates in the EEC, especially since an earlier investment in Progress, a Sicily-focused company intended as a starter for Italian expansion, had turned out to be a failure. At one stage MAPFRE considered entering Japan, but the Far East plans were finally scaled down to just businesses in Hong Kong and Macau.

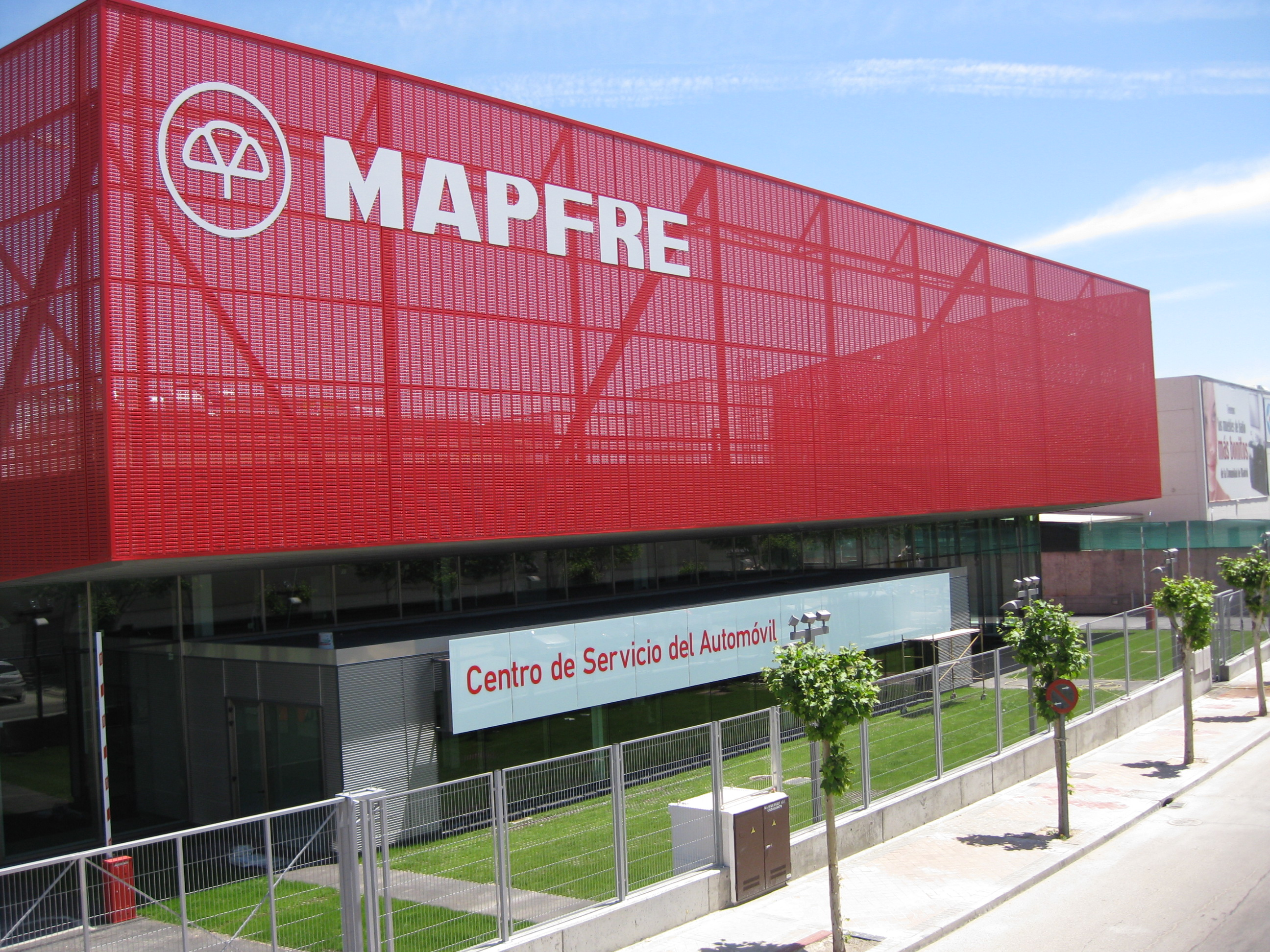
MAPFRE SSC, Alcorcon

In 1985 Larramendi re-formatted his role from chief executive to "presidente de la comisión de control institucional", but still remained at the steering wheel of the companies. In the late 1980s he co-designed Plan Sistema MAPFRE 92, redrawing the whole business in line with the Japanese zaibatsu model, popular among corporate moguls of the era. Its key feature was turning multi-business conglomerates into loose federative schemes and giving huge autonomy to their component entities, although two key companies, Mutual MAPFRE and Corporación MAPFRE, remained at MAPFRE's core.

In 1990 the company re-emphasized its banking arm by creating Banco MAPFRE, the nucleus of Crédito del Sistema MAPFRE. Larramendi reached the age of 70 that same year and resigned from all corporate roles except in the international business, where he stepped down in 1995, complying with the rules he had created and introduced himself. He left the company operating 1,648 branch offices, employing 4,500 people directly and a further 12,000 indirectly, and with 500 million pesetas of consolidated assets and annual proceeds of 200 million pesetas.

== MAPFRE: corporate success factors ==
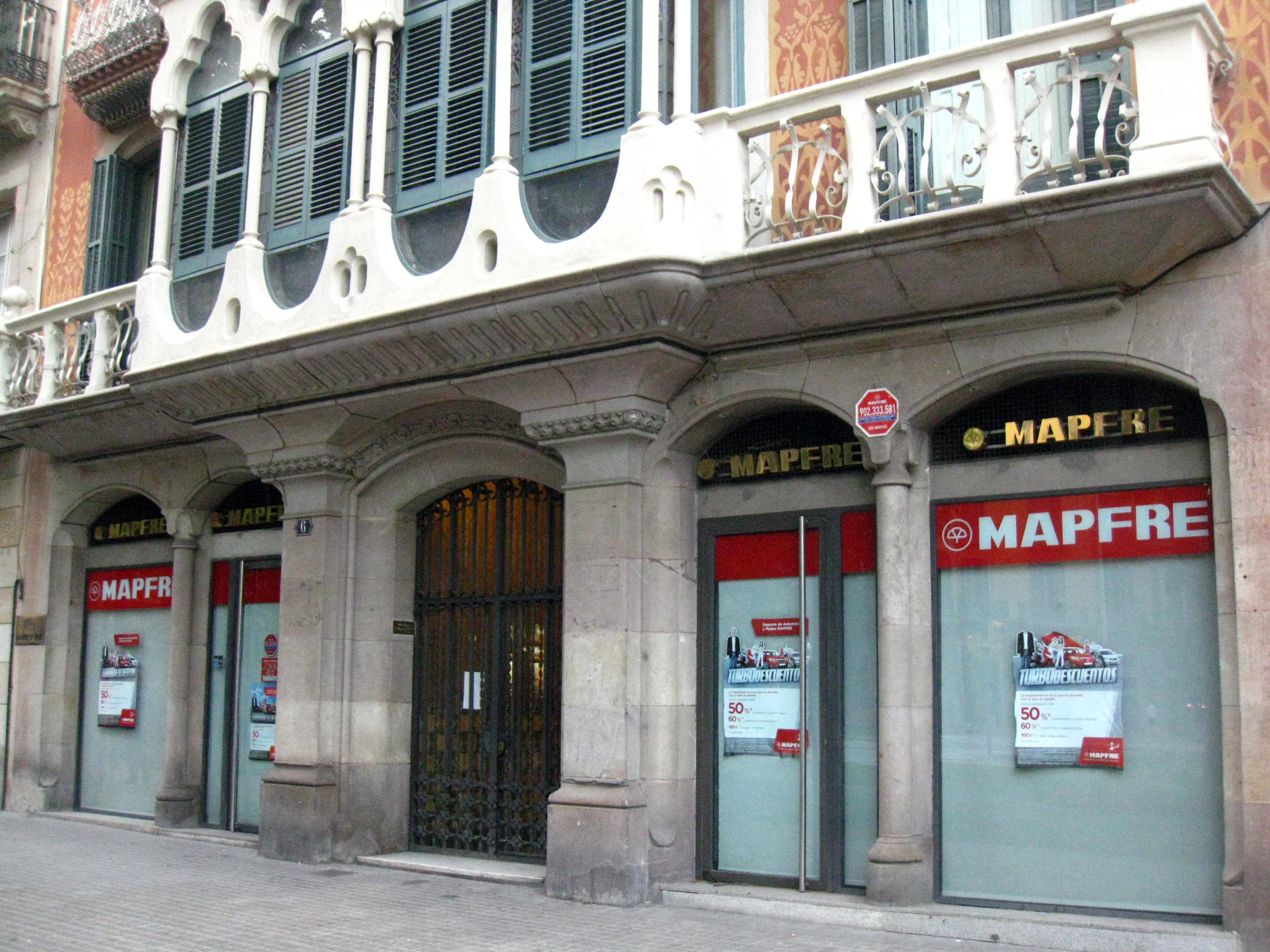
MAPFRE agency, Barcelona

Larramendi is counted among the 100 most influential Spanish managers of the 20th century. When asked about his success Larramendi usually pointed to human resources (HR) factors, principally the internal code of conduct he introduced, at that time unheard of in corporate business and responsible for the emergence of a new breed of employees called mafristas. This code of conduct was supposed to reflect the moral values he adhered to – mutual respect, transparency, and integrity – but he also emphasised the importance of delegation, de-centralised management, and responsiveness to what he called the "anarchist realm" of individual initiatives and ideas. This model is now firmly incorporated in change management manuals as "emergent change", as opposed to "planned change".

Business historians agree that Larramendi's approach to the human factor was key. Importing mechanisms he learnt in Britain and the US he introduced modern HR management with career paths, training plans, supervision, mentoring, and other techniques, together with a preference for recruiting university graduates. His general mindset focused on stakeholders – employees, owners, customers, suppliers, everyone affected – instead of merely shareholders, the default position for present-day managers though a novelty at that time. He also instigated a decentralised management structure with regional direcciones generales instead of delegados provinciales, ensuring that full managerial accountability for each company with little cross-subsidising would contribute to the efficiency of internal operations. As such, he is credited with developing a business model dubbed "specialized diversification", allowing customer focus, reduced back office, and increased economies of scale by taking advantage of numerous shared services.

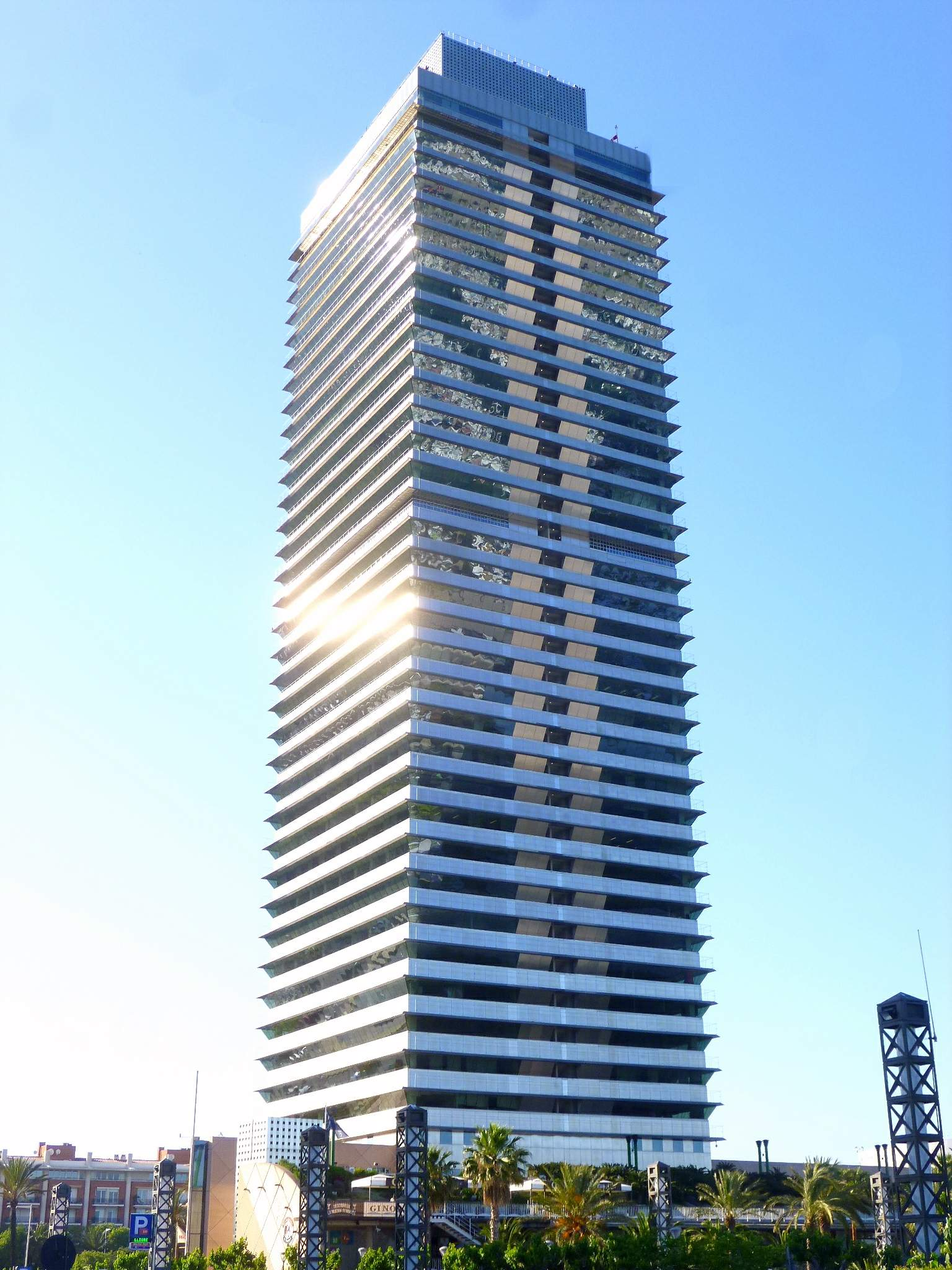
Torre Mapfre, Barcelona

Larramendi is also deemed responsible for introducing to Spain a number of features specific to insurance and financial markets, including new products such as travel assistance plans for motorists, home assistance programs for home owners, new corporate techniques like risk management, broadening the scope of activities to entirely new areas, and a new strategic customer interface concept of "one-stop financial shopping". His almost obsessive focus on accessible and accurate information led to the company's leadership in technology. MAPFRE was the second company in Spain to introduce telex, and among the first companies to embrace broad-scale digital data storage techniques.

MAPFRE's success in Latin America is deemed a perfect illustration of John Duning's "eclectic paradigm" theory, with ownership advantages, location advantages, and internalisation advantages all combined and exploited to the utmost. MAPFRE also demonstrated Richard Caves' "intangible assets theory", with Larramendi's focus on re-insurance, direct insurance and assistance, HR management, and especially his counting on cultural proximity, allowing MAPFRE to outpace other competitors, especially those that were US-based. For this he was acknowledged with a number of national and international corporate honours, including the Golden Medal of International Insurance Seminar Founder's Award in 1986, and the Medalla de Oro del Seguro Español in 1987.

== Cultural patronage ==
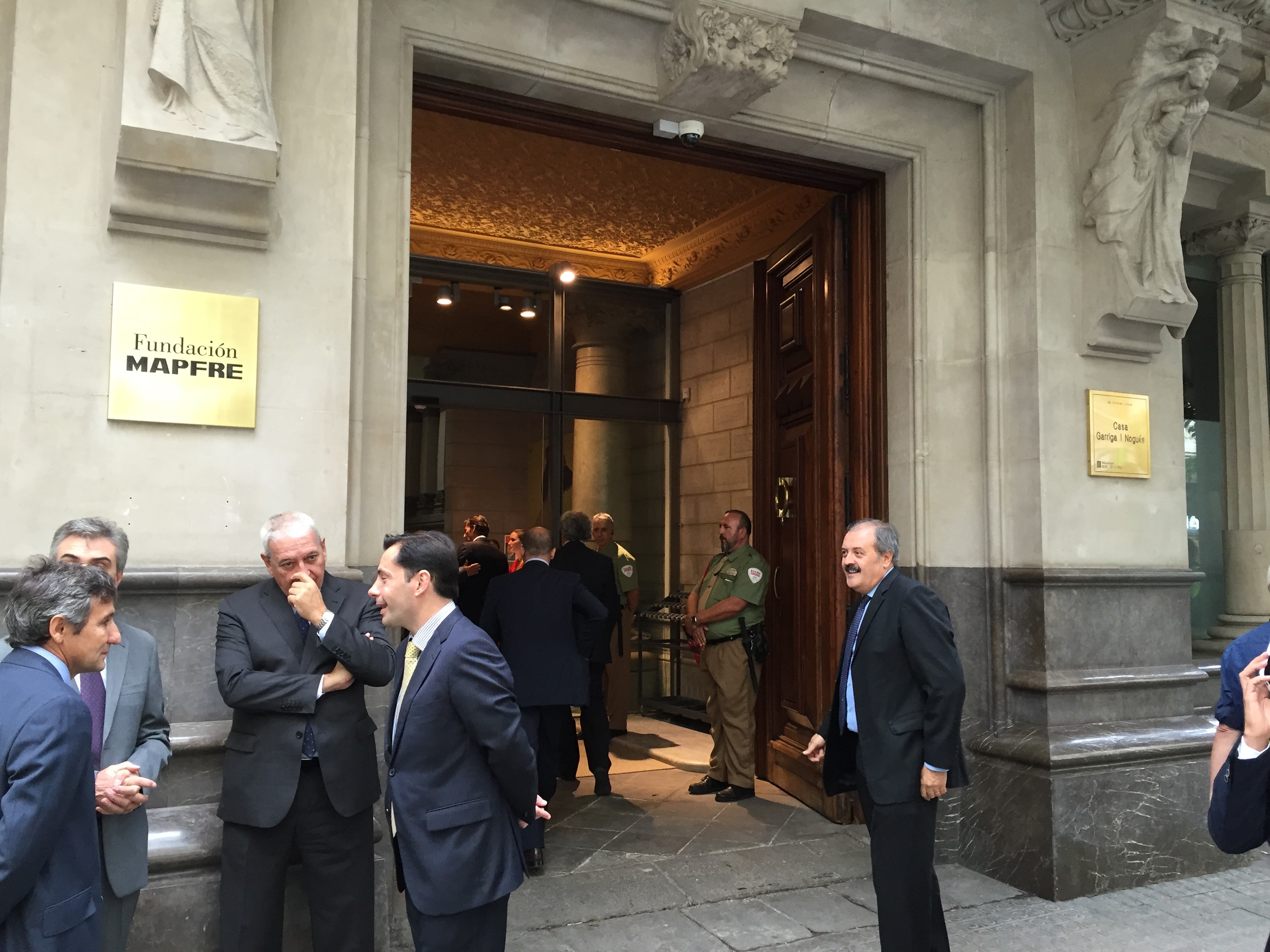
Fundación MAPFRE premises

In keeping with his concept of corporate social responsibility, Larramendi engaged in non-profit initiatives from the early 1970s. In 1975 he set up Fundación MAPFRE, intended to propagate safety at work and support accident recovery schemes, followed by Fundación Cultural MAPFRE Vida and Fundación MAPFRE América in 1988, Fundación MAPFRE Estudios and Fundación MAPFRE Medicina in 1989, and Fundación MAPFRE Guanarteme. But it was when he retired that Larramendi threw himself into such activities, dedicating most effort to Fundación América, its key initiative being the launching of Colecciones of documents on topics such as indigenous languages or urban centers. Other initiatives included issuing new editions of historical documents and co-sponsoring international Americanist conferences, colloquies, and programs, often in collaboration with UNESCO.

In the 1990s Larramendi co-founded and was the moving spirit behind Fundación Histórica Tavera, dedicated to protecting the bibliographic and documentary patrimony of Spain, Portugal and Iberoamerica, also operating an institute of the same name. The foundation was involved in digitalisation projects, programs supporting bibliographical and reference initiatives, as well as cataloguing and co-operating in archival efforts targeted at various civil and ecclesiastic institutions. The Institute also published some digital series under the title Clasicós Tavera, each one covering a single historical topic like Iberoamerica or regional histories. This activity was later transferred to Centro de Referencias REFMAP and Centro de Publicaciones Digitales, later renamed Digibis.

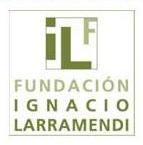
Fundación Ignacio Larramendi logotype

Another thread of Larramendi's patronage activity was related to Carlism. He contributed financially to a number of Carlism-flavoured publishing initiatives, especially Aportes. In honor of his father he set up Fundación Hernando de Larramendi in 1986, currently operating as Fundación Ignacio Larramendi, with a declared mission to promote "caridad en las relaciones sociales" (trans: "charity in social relations") in line with Catholic teaching, as well as to act as an independent think-tank, to study the history of Carlism, and to support non-commercial scientific research.

Most of the public initiatives of the Foundation are related to the dissemination of Carlist thought and promotion of Carlist studies. However, it also releases digitalised collections of Traditionalist theorists; publishes mostly scholarly thought but also literary works in the Colección Luis Hernando de Larramendi series; and awards the Premio Internacional de Historia del Carlismo Luis Hernando de Larramendi, with the objective to "apoyar a los libros que aportan conocimientos objetivos para la verdad, no la verdad falsificada, no la verdad sectaria, sino la verdad a secas" (trans: "support books that provide objective knowledge of the truth, not falsified truth, not sectarian truth, but the truth itself"). The Foundation also runs a website making available a number of digitalised works and press cuttings, as well as making various Hispanic projects more readily available to the general and professional public through the Foundation's Polymath Virtual Library, which republishes (in Spanish) many important works concerning culture, literature, and science originating in the Hispanosphere.

The Spanish state acknowledged Larramendi's cultural patronage by awarding him a number of honours, most notably the Encomienda de Isabel la Católica in 1996 and the Gran Cruz de la Orden del Mérito Civil in 1998.

== Writings ==
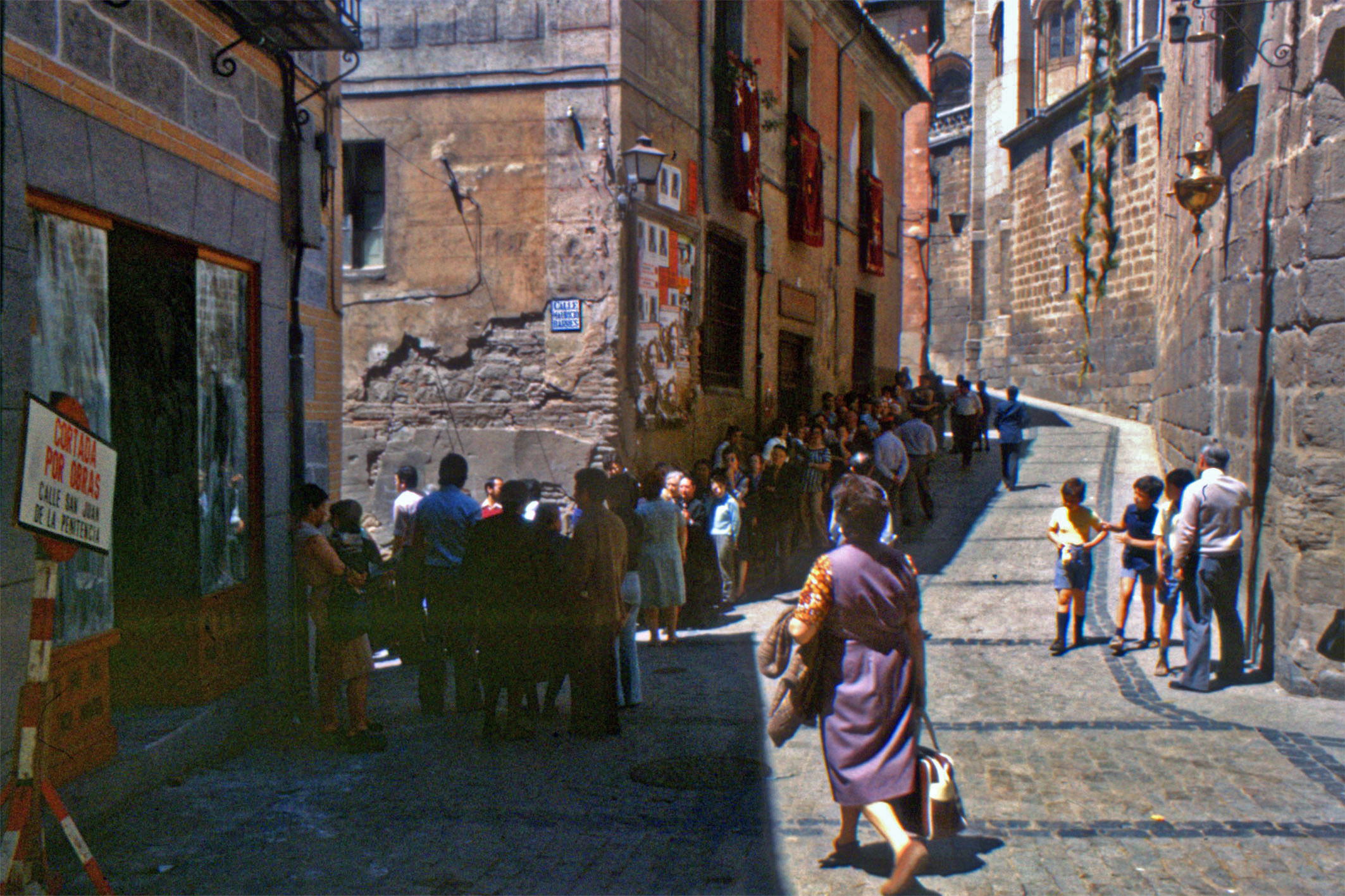
Spanish elections, 1977

Larramendi wrote eight books and published some fifty articles, mostly in specialised reviews, with the majority related to business.

Tres claves de la vida inglesa (1951) was the result of Larramendi's spell in London and formally discussed that country's legal, commercial, and insurance systems. The book praised the British social and state model, hailing it as a merger of efficient economic order and organisation on the one hand and traditional values and structures on the other. The British system was judged as balanced, especially when compared with the French model and its bureaucratic illusions regarding the state's powers to build a new order. A fascination with the British sense of continuity and how its institutions acted as intermediaries between state and society remained with Larramendi all his life. Tres claves stands out as an anomaly in Carlist thought which usually tended to be anti-British, lambasting Albion as a hotbed of Liberalism, plutocracy, freemasonry, and greed.

In 1977 Larramendi published Anotaciones de sociopolítica independiente, intended as a discussion of post-Francoist Spain. The work was a non-belligerent advance of a social-Catholic vision, and in practical terms it vaguely proposed a hybrid regime with some regulatory mechanisms working as checks-and-balances versus politics decided by universal suffrage. Larramendi thought most Francoist institutions to be useless, and he acknowledged Francoism in general with mixed feelings as a system which ensured peace and socio-economic transformation but was plagued by corruption and vengeance. Greatly in favour of Spanish integration within the West European structures, Larramendi also proposed "la gran Europa de raza blanca y herencia cristiana" (trans: "the great Europe of white race and Christian heritage") as the political entity for the 21st century. A repeated thread was anxiety about a would-be Communist penetration of Spain, although the book acknowledged Socialism in its "non-maximalist" incarnations as an option to be discussed.

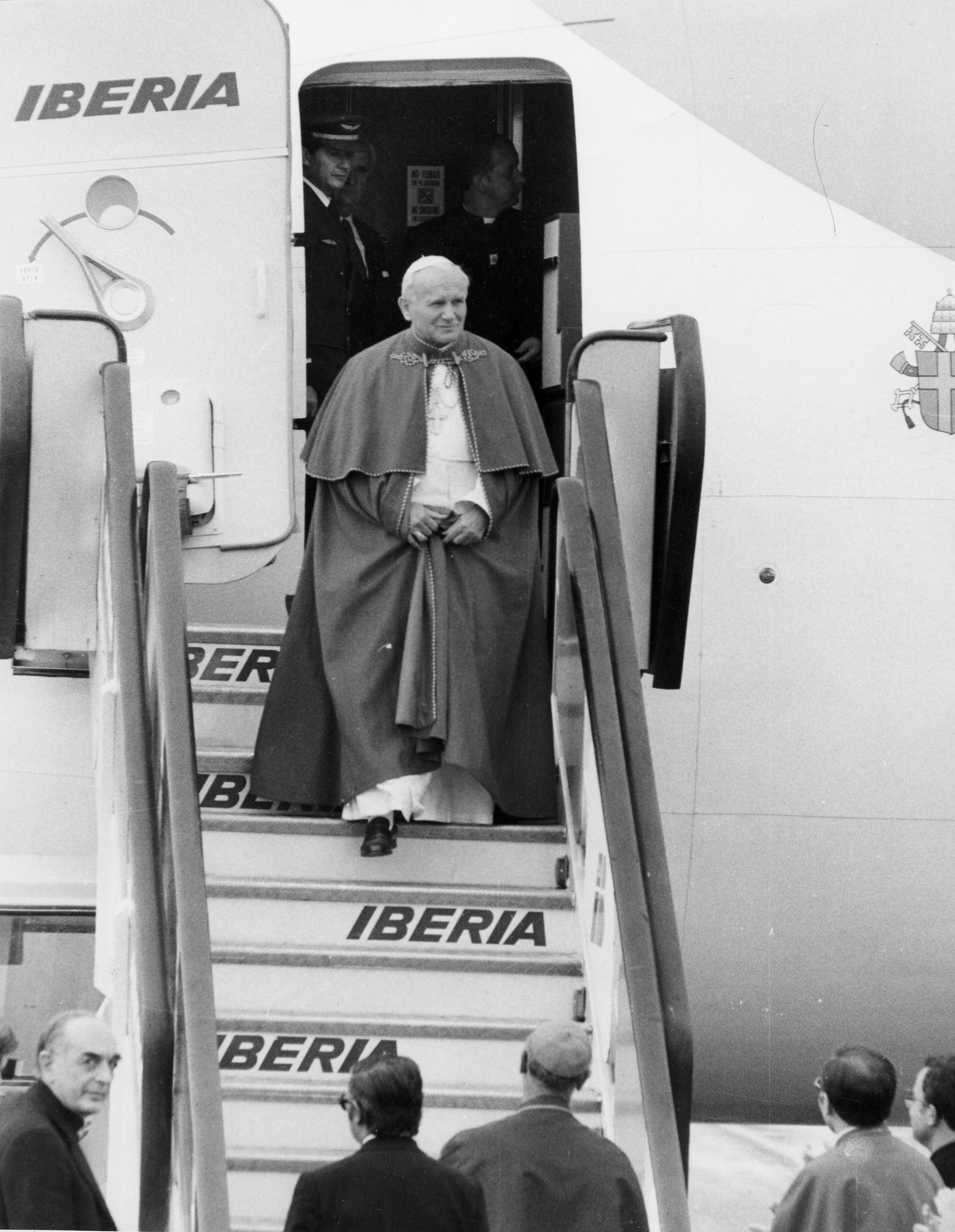
Pope John Paul II visiting Spain, 1980s

In 1992 Larramendi published Utopía de la Nueva América, a result of his American fascinations, with the key thesis being that Iberoamérica and Angloamérica would merge to create a new cultural entity. In the mid-1990s he commenced his written opus magnum, a series of five volumes intended as a response to perceived threats of global imbalance, disintegration of Europe, and fragmentation of Spain. It was supposed to advance a proposal of "reforma operativa del estado español" (trans: "operational reform of the Spanish state"), but also to address more general problems. The series was finally issued as three books of almost 750 pages in total: Crisis de sociedad: reflexiones para el siglo XXI (1995); Panorama para una reforma del estado (1996); and Bienestar solidario (1998). All three books were both holistic and at the same time fairly detailed attempts to redefine key public institutions in line with a vision of Christian solidarity. Crisis tended to be more historical and theoretical; Panorama discussed key state operation areas; while Bienestar focused on key public structures, mostly related to education, labour, and insurance.

Larramendi's final and possibly most popular book was Así se hizo MAPFRE (2000), in which he discussed the history of MAPFRE against a fairly wide background of both his personal life and the general business and social environment.

== See also ==
- Carlism
- Mapfre
- Hispanidad
- Luis Hernando de Larramendi y Ruiz
