= José Selva Mergelina =

Spanish politician

The Most Illustrious The Marquess of Villores
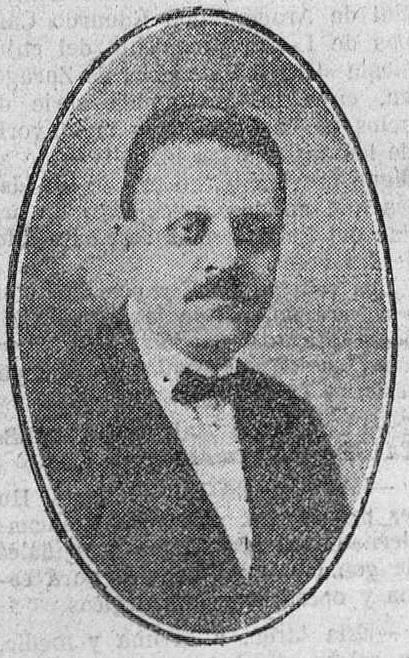
- Born: José Selva Mergelina; 1884; Villena, Spain
- Died: 1932 (aged 47–48); Valencia, Spain
- Occupation: landowner
- Known for: politician
- Political party: Comunión Tradicionalista (also known as Comunión Legitimista and Comunión Católico-Monárquíca)

José María de Selva y Mergelina Mergelina y Llorens, 5th Marquess of Villores (1884–1932) was a Spanish Carlist politician.

== Family and youth ==
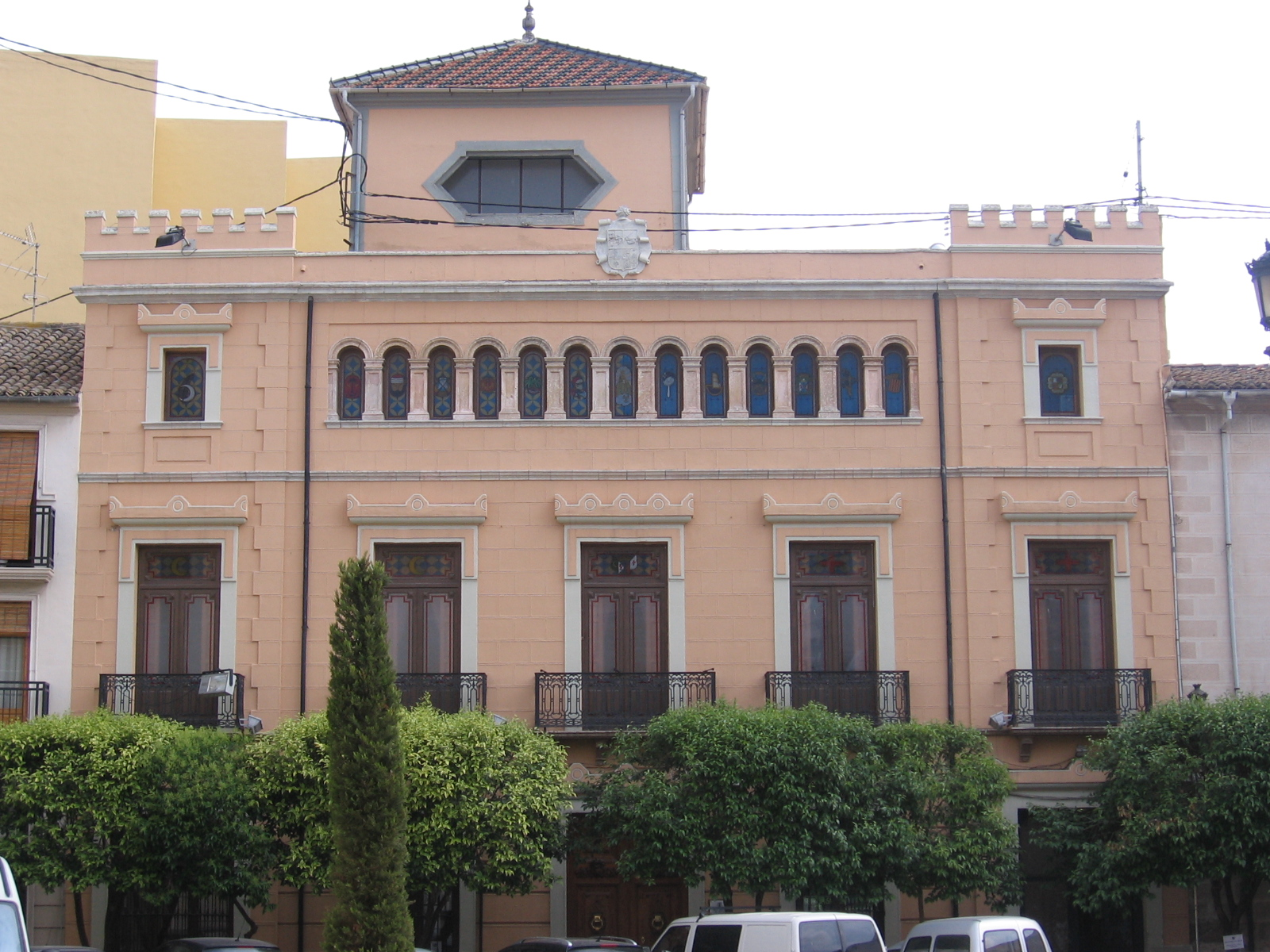
Villena, Casa Selva

José María de Selva y Mergelina Mergelina y Llorens was a descendant of two Levantine landowner families of Selva and Mergelina. Both have been dominant in the Alicantine town of Villena and inter-married a few times over the centuries. His ancestors and relatives can be traced back to the 16th century, some of them notable figures in Spanish history. His paternal grandfather Rafael Selva López de Oliver (1820-1878) served as alcalde of the town. The family supported the Carlists since the First Carlist War; José's father, Enrique Selva Mergelina López de Oliver y Selva (1852-1923), was in the late 19th century a vice-president of the Valencian Carlist Junta Provincial. José's mother, María de la Trinidad Mergelina Llorens (1851-1924), was cousin of the Carlist Valencian leader Joaquín Lloréns Fernández and related to a number of noble families.

Like his 6 siblings José María was brought up in a fervently Catholic ambience. Following initial home schooling, as an older child he frequented Colegio de San José, a prestigious Valencian institute established in 1870 by Agustin Cabré and run by the Jesuits; he completed the teenage education there in 1900. Selva continued his scholarship at Universidad de Valencia to study law, philosophy and letters, having graduated in 1905.

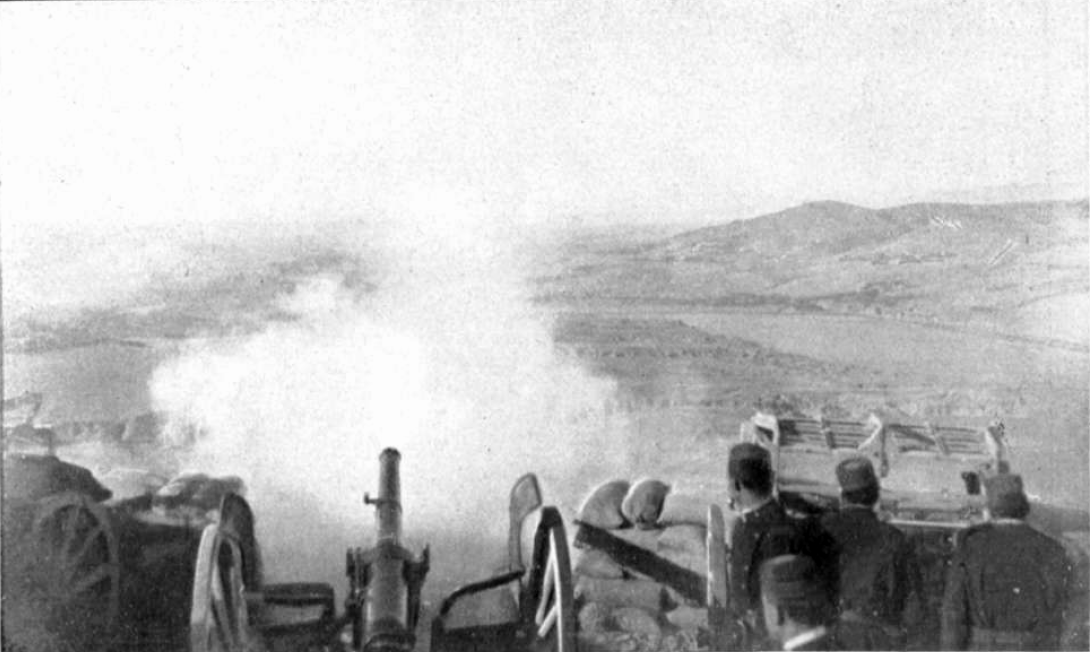
Riff War, 1911

José Selva married María Josefa Salvador y Núñez Robres (1909), descendant of an aristocratic Valencian family holding a number of estates across Levante and daughter of José Salvador de la Figuera Barroso de Frías y Mezquita, 4th marquis of Villores. The couple had 4 children, Enrique (1910), José Maria (1911), María Dolores (1913) and Rafael (1914). Following the premature death of his wife in 1916, in 1918 Selva married her older sister, María Vicenta Salvador y Núñez Robres. Since her father had no male descendants, she had arranged to inherit the marquesado; following the marriage, José Selva was also entitled to the honour as marqués consorte. His second marriage produced no children. The family lived in their rural Xàtiva estate.

Villores' younger brother, Juan Selva Mergelina, who was also a Carlist activist, served in the Spanish army; he commenced military service as segundo teniente of infantry in Mallorca in 1910, to be soon promoted to teniente primero and to pass to reserva territorial de Canarias. He resumed military service in Spanish Morocco during a rather calm period of the Rif War, assigned to the Tetuán regiment. In 1914, following meritorious service, Juan Selva was nominated infantry captain. His final rank was this of a Commandant. Arrested in the aftermath of the failed Sanjurjo coup d'état, he was later detained by the Republicans during the Civil War; he survived the incarceration to be nominated civil governor of Tarragona during early Francoism and to become member of the Falangist Consejo Nacional in 1943; their sister Dolores was active in the Carlist relief organization, Socorro Blanco. Villores’ oldest son, Enrique Selva Salvador, became the next Marqués de Villores and was an active Carlist during the Republic already; he later lobbied for the Traditionalist cause in the Franco years and became president of the Carlist circulo in Valencia.

== Early public activity ==
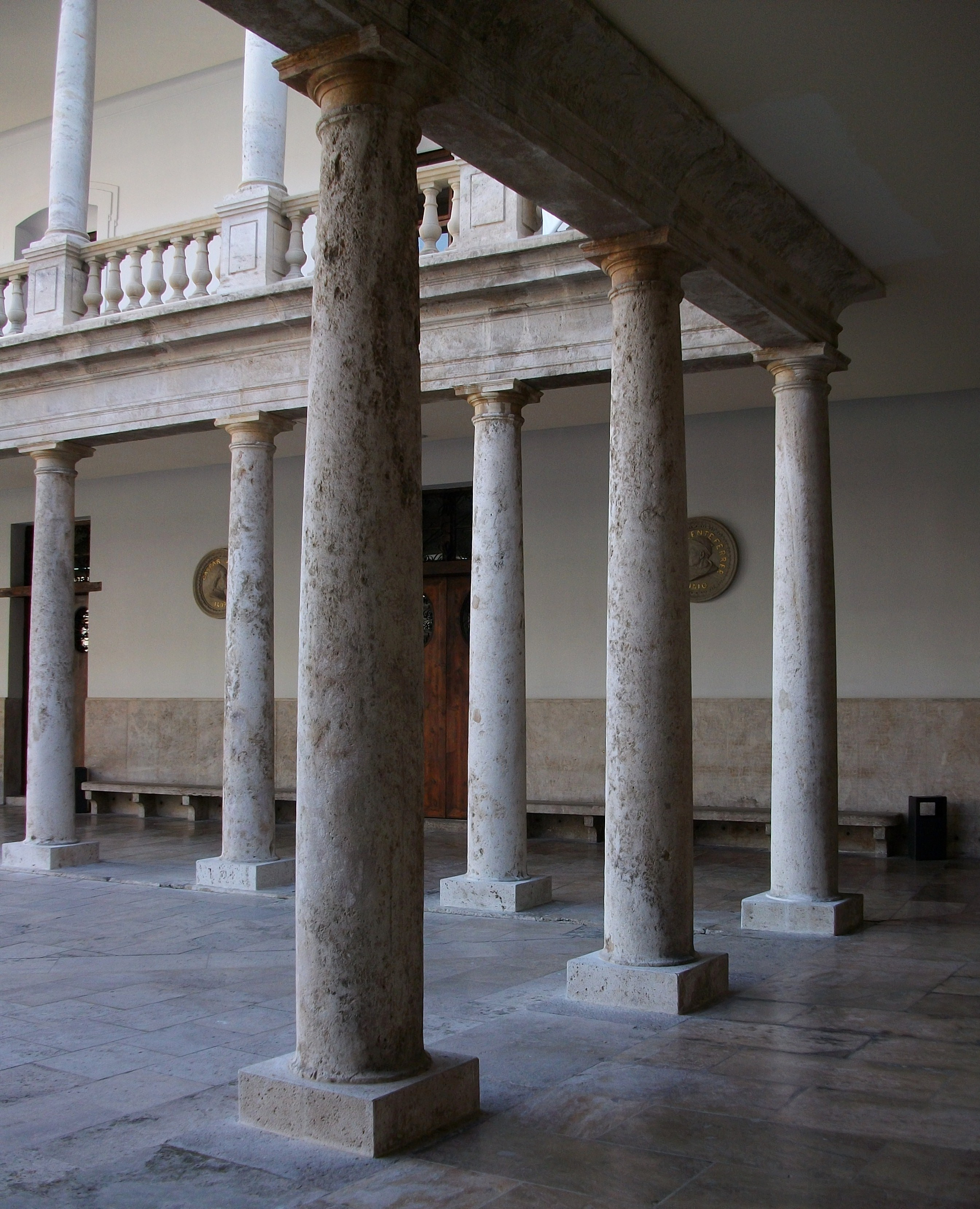
University of Valencia

José Selva commenced his public activity at the university, getting engaged in the very active Valencian branch of Liga Católica. He took part in local elections, running on a broad monarchist ticket, and was elected to Valencia city council. He later served in the Valencian regional government as Deputy mayor.

Having inherited a fundamentally Catholic and ultraconservative outlook, Selva entered the structures of the local Carlist organization quite early. With his father vicepresident of the Junta Provincial and his maternal uncle one of the national Carlist leaders, Selva soon grew in the Levantine party structures. He became the young lieutenant of Manuel Simó Marín, jefe of the Valencian Jaimismo. In 1913 he was already Presidente del Círculo Jaimista, representing the party on regional political stage. As a rising star of the movement he took part in national Traditionalist gatherings in Bordeaux and Lourdes of the 1910s, where he was personally introduced to the claimant, Don Jaime. At that time Carlism, already increasingly marginalized in Spanish politics, was also paralysed by conflict between the Carlist king and the top Carlist ideologue, Juan Vázquez de Mella. When de Mella was expelled in 1919 and left to build his own branch of Traditionalism, many party leaders, regional jefes (including Simó Marín in Valencia) and otherwise distinguished figures decided to join the secessionists; Don Jaime was left with very few recognized personalities by his side. Impressed by Selva, who since 1918 appeared as marqués de Villores, the Carlist king entrusted him with leadership and re-organisation of the Valencian Carlism.

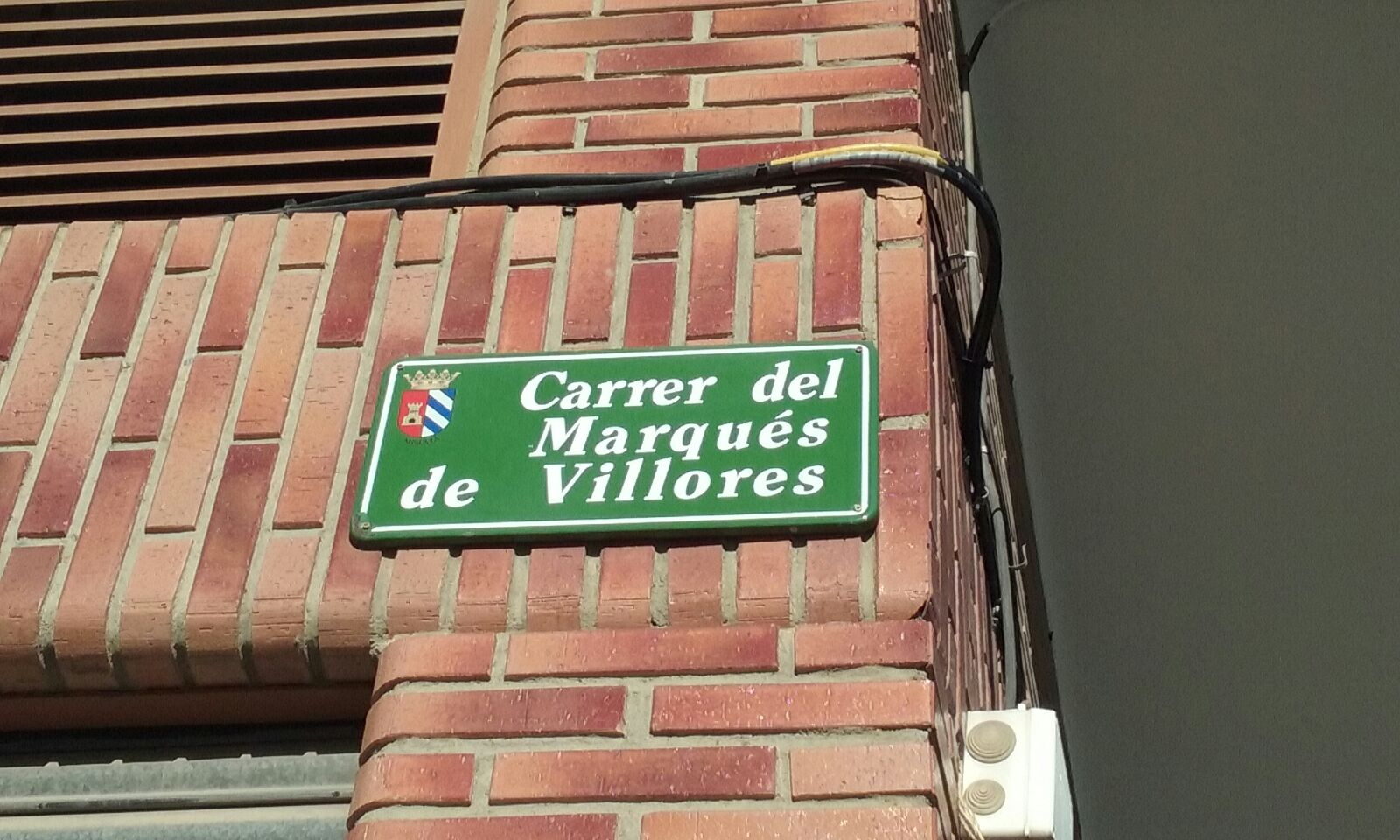
Carrer del Marqués de Villores in Mislata

The 34-year-old commenced his duties enthusiastically; he toured the region reconstructing the circulos and launched a new regional weekly, El Tradicionalista; since during his youth he demonstrated a penchant for letters he also contributed as an author. His three years of work were appreciated when in late 1921, following transitional leadership tenures of Pascual Comín Moya and Luis Hernando de Larramendi, Don Jaime had to choose his new political representative. Apart from few senile but still loyal leaders there were many potential candidates among politicians from the older or younger generation, who had already served a few terms either in the Cortes or in the Senate. However, for reasons which are not entirely clear, the claimant opted for Villores; nominated secretario general politico, he became the youngest Carlist political leader ever.

== Jefe ==
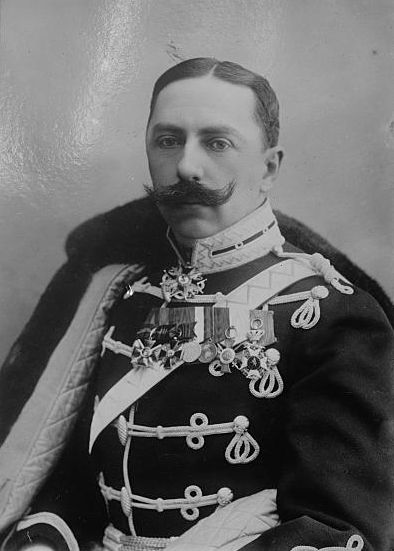
S. M. Jaime III

The most immediate task faced by de Villores was reconstruction and consolidation of the movement, shattered by defections to the Mellistas. Trying to rebuild local structures of the party, at that time also known as Comunión Legitimista, he shuttled across the country promoting new local and regional jefes. However, at the beginning of his tenure he suffered a heavy blow by failing to prevent the closure of El Correo Español. The daily, established back in 1888, was a semi-official and most effective Carlist public tribune, its editorial board decimated during the Mellist crisis. The new Carlist leader did not manage to sustain the ailing newspaper, which closed in 1922. Public accusations continued to circulate and Villores failed to set a new press tribune; the mainstream Carlism had to do with no nationwide newspaper until 1932.

In terms of an overall political strategy Villores followed the course set by Jaime III: abandoning grand designs, he focused on grassroots work. Jaimismo was to assume a definitely regional and foral shape. Some scholars refer to this approach as a new Carlist policy, based on federalist program merged with the idea of social and economic justice. Possibly as part of this strategy in 1923 for the first time in the 20th century the Carlists abstained from racing to the Cortes; the official reason quoted was disillusionment with “farsa parlamentaria”.

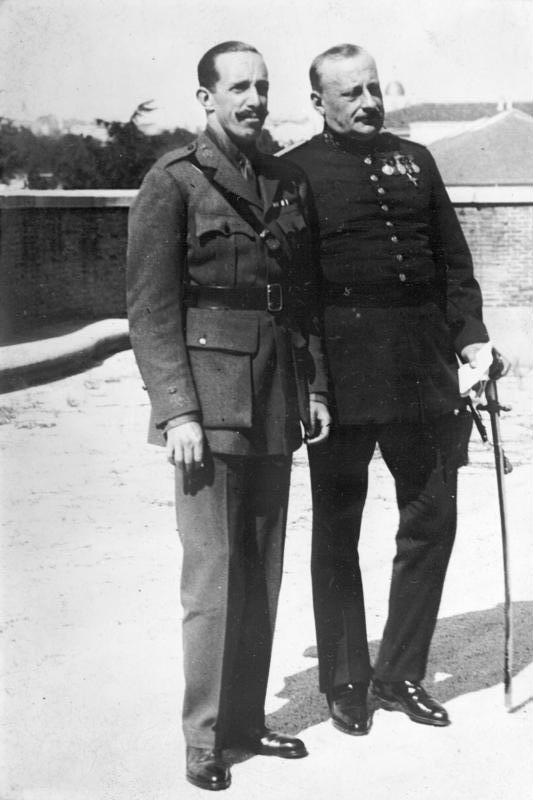
Alfonso de Borbón, Primo de Rivera

The Carlists received the Primo de Rivera dictatorship warmly, cheerful about the fall of corrupted democracy and considering the coup to be a step towards traditionalist monarchy. De Villores, in line with instructions from Don Jaime who ordered cautious co-operation with the regime, recommended entering the primoderiverista Somatén militia and joined the formation himself, shifting focus away from the Carlist own paramilitary, Requeté. In 1925 the claimant withdrew his support, circumspect as it was, marking the beginning of the Carlist opposition policy. Executing the now reversed strategy, Villores kept the party away from Unión Patriótica and expulsed those who accepted invitation to Asamblea Nacional Consultiva; he failed to prevent further defections, though he managed to avert spontaneous insurgency attempts.

The political bewilderment of Dictablanda seemed to offer new opportunities for an increasingly marginalized Carlism and there are some indications that the party considered taking part in “controlled” elections, planned (and eventually abandoned) by general Berenguer. Villores declared himself leaning towards a more active policy and seemed supportive of a broad Catholic coalition in defense of the monarchy, though he challenged the primate, cardinal Segura, and was firm to underline that monarchism could not amount to support of the liberal Alfonsine system.

== Final months of leadership ==
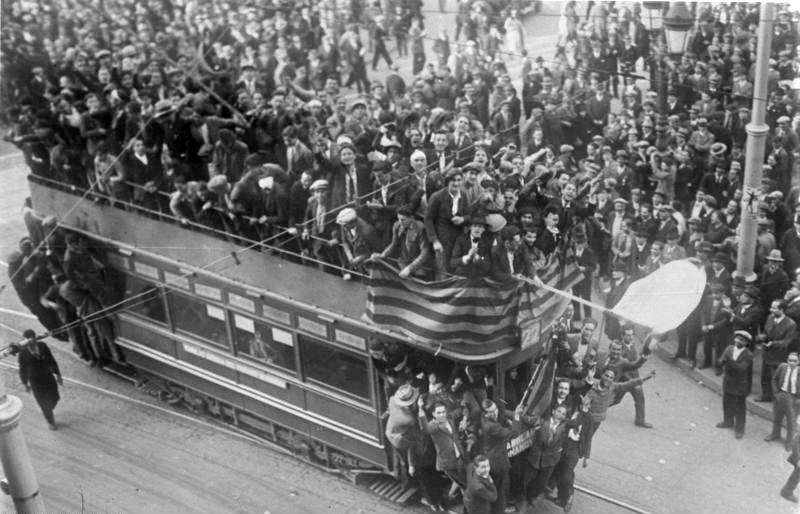
Republic declared, 1931

The final period of de Villores’ leadership term was even more turbulent than the initial one, marked by advent of the Republic and death of Jaime III. Initially de Villores was disoriented like most Carlists were: delighted to see the loathed Alfonsist monarchy toppled, but detesting the republican democracy even more. He followed the initial conciliatory manifesto of the claimant, who ordered his followers to assist the provisional government in maintaining order and defending Catholic sites until a genuine national assembly is elected. After the boycotted elections of 1923 Villores was finally able to lead the Carlist drive for the Cortes, but the actual campaign seemed rather disorganised. The outcome was 5 deputies, the performance worse than the worst results achieved during the Restauración. For Villores personally the campaign took a deeply humiliating turn; competing in the urban Valencian district he was trashed by leading candidates and recorded a disastrous result.

Contempt for militantly secular Republic drew three competitive branches of Carlism closer; Villores seemed to support consolidation, as in June 1931 he took part in massive public gatherings calling for unity. The cause was facilitated by unexpected death of Jaime III and assumption of the Carlist claim by Don Alfonso Carlos in October. Villores represented the mainstream Carlism in re-unification negotiations, which in early 1932 merged the Integristas, the Mellistas and the Jaimistas in the Comunión Tradicionalista, with de Villores agreed as its leader.

Talks with the Alfonsists proved to be definitely more difficult. Though the deposed Alfonso XIII and Jaime III (represented not by Villores, but by José María Gomez de Pujadas) seemed to agree a vague dynastical compromise, its version edited by de Villores was rejected by the Alfonsinos. Another royal agreement, known as "pacto de Territet", was greeted with ice-cold welcome among the Carlists. By that time de Villores, for months suffering from deteriorating health, was already unable to take part in the debate. His funeral in May 1932 proved to be another opportunity for public display of rapidly swelling Carlist zeal across a few cities in Spain.

== Reception and legacy ==
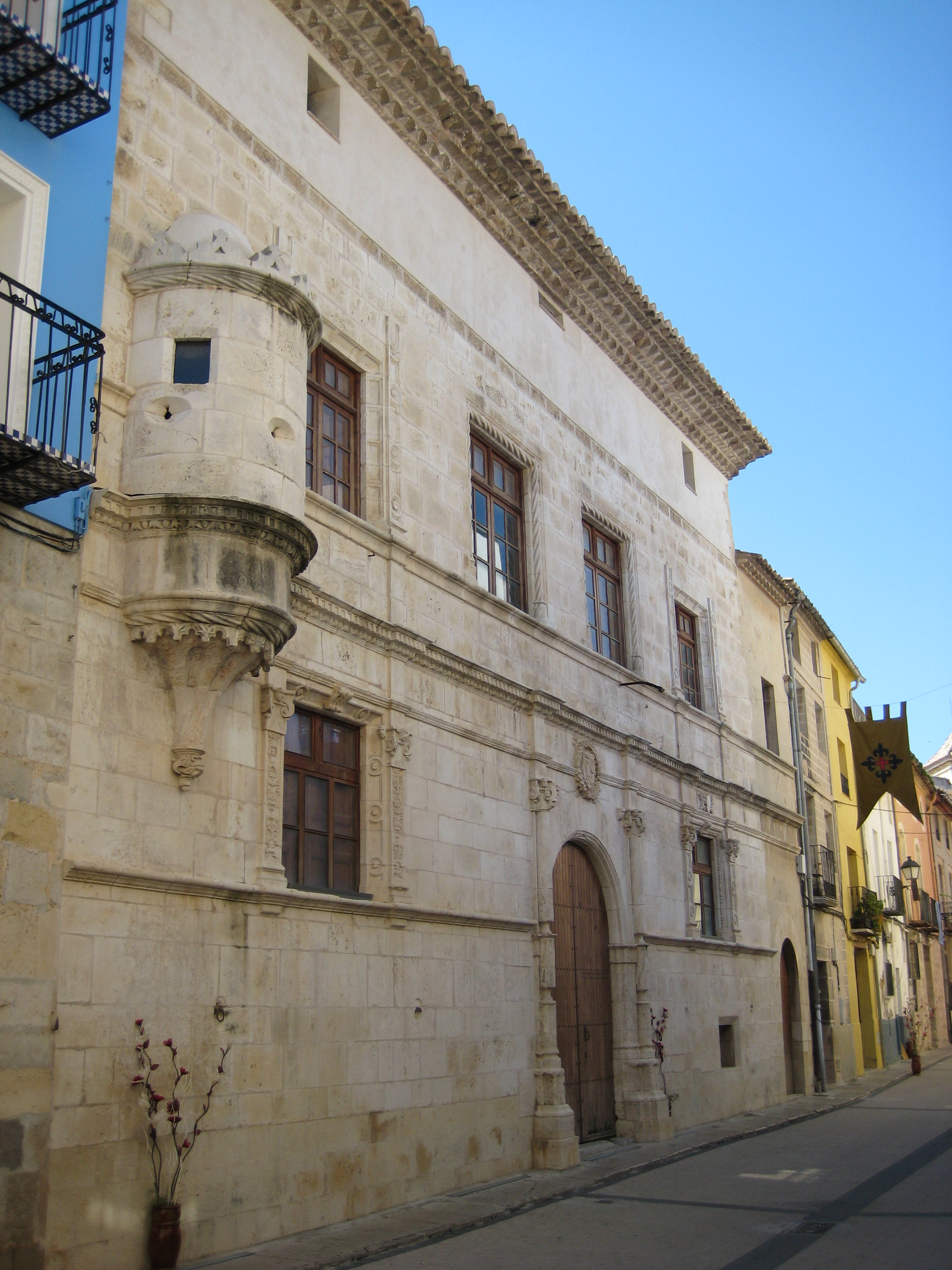
Palacio de Villores, S. Mateu

In historiography the figure of Marquess de Villores does not generate major controversies. He earned no monography so far – be it either a major work or a minor article – and is treated marginally even in works dedicated to history of Traditionalism. Though most scholars concede that 1920s produced the most dramatic decline of Carlism since its birth, they do not necessarily agree whether Villores could have prevented it. Some (Clemente) consider him a good leader who instead of internal power struggle brought stability and consolidated the party. Some (Blinkhorn) call his leadership “flaccid” suggesting that he lacked the vision and the energy. Both seem to agree that he was executing the policy engineered by Don Jaime rather than drafting designs on his own.

There are streets commemorating “Marqués de Villores” in many Spanish villages and cities (including his native Villena), but none of them indicates which marquis in sequence is meant. A few buildings in the Valencia region are advertised as related to de Villores family; the building where José Selva was born and raised serves as host to an unrelated Museo Festero. A Carlist circulo of Albacete is named after Marqués de Villores. The marquesado itself is still functional.

== See also ==
- Carlism
- Second Spanish Republic
- Jaime III
