= Tradition (disambiguation) =

Traditions are customs practiced from one generation to the next.

Tradition or traditions may refer to:

== Religion ==
- Churchmanship, also known as "tradition," a school of thought within Anglican Christianity
- Tradition, a lineage or denomination of Wicca
- Sacred tradition, the deposit of faith on which some Christian churches' dogma is based

== Arts, entertainment, and media ==
- Tradition (film), a 2016 short film
- Traditions, a 1955 Hong Kong film (List of Hong Kong films of 1955)
- Tradition (band), a United Kingdom-based reggae band
- Tradition (Michael Angelo Batio album), 1998
- Tradition (Doc Watson album), 1977
- "Tradition" (song), the opening number of Fiddler on the Roof
- "The Tradition", a song by Halsey from If I Can't Have Love, I Want Power
- Tradition (journal), a quarterly journal of Orthodox Jewish thought
- Traditions (Mage: The Ascension), an alliance of secret societies in the Mage: the Ascension role-playing game
- A defunct Swedish chain of game stores, owned by Target Games
- The Tradition (poetry collection), a 2019 poetry collection by Jericho Brown
- Traditions (Bobby Womack album), 1999
- Traditions (Fanny Lumsden album), 2026

== Other uses ==
- The Tradition, an American professional golf event
- Tradition, a barley variety

== See also ==
- Trad
- Traditionalism
