= Neo-traditionalism =

Neo-traditionalism or neotraditionalism may refer to:

- New Urbanism, a movement in architecture
- Neotraditionalism (politics), a school of political thought
  - Islamic neo-traditionalism
  - Traditionalism (Spain) ("neotradicionalismo"), a political movement in Spain
- Neotraditional country, a style of music
- Néo-trad, a musical style from Quebec
- Neo-traditionalism of Japan, a music CD

== See also ==
- Neotraditional (disambiguation)
- Traditionalism (disambiguation)
- New Tradition (disambiguation)
