= Neotraditional =

Neotraditional may refer to:

- Neotraditional country, a style of country music
- Néo-trad, a musical style from Quebec
- New Classical Architecture, an architecture movement
- New Urbanism, an urban design movement
- Traditionalist School (perennialism)
- Islamic neo-traditionalism

== See also ==
- Neotraditionalism (disambiguation)
- Traditionalism (disambiguation)
- New Tradition (disambiguation)
