= Traditionist =

Traditionist may refer to someone who upholds or transmits a tradition, a traditionalist. In technical usage (from "tradition" as a translation of the Arabic term hadith) it may refer to:

- Scholar of hadith (muhaddith)
- Member of ahl al-hadith, an early Islamic movement and theological school
