= Antonio Juan de Vildósola =

Spanish writer, politician and journalist

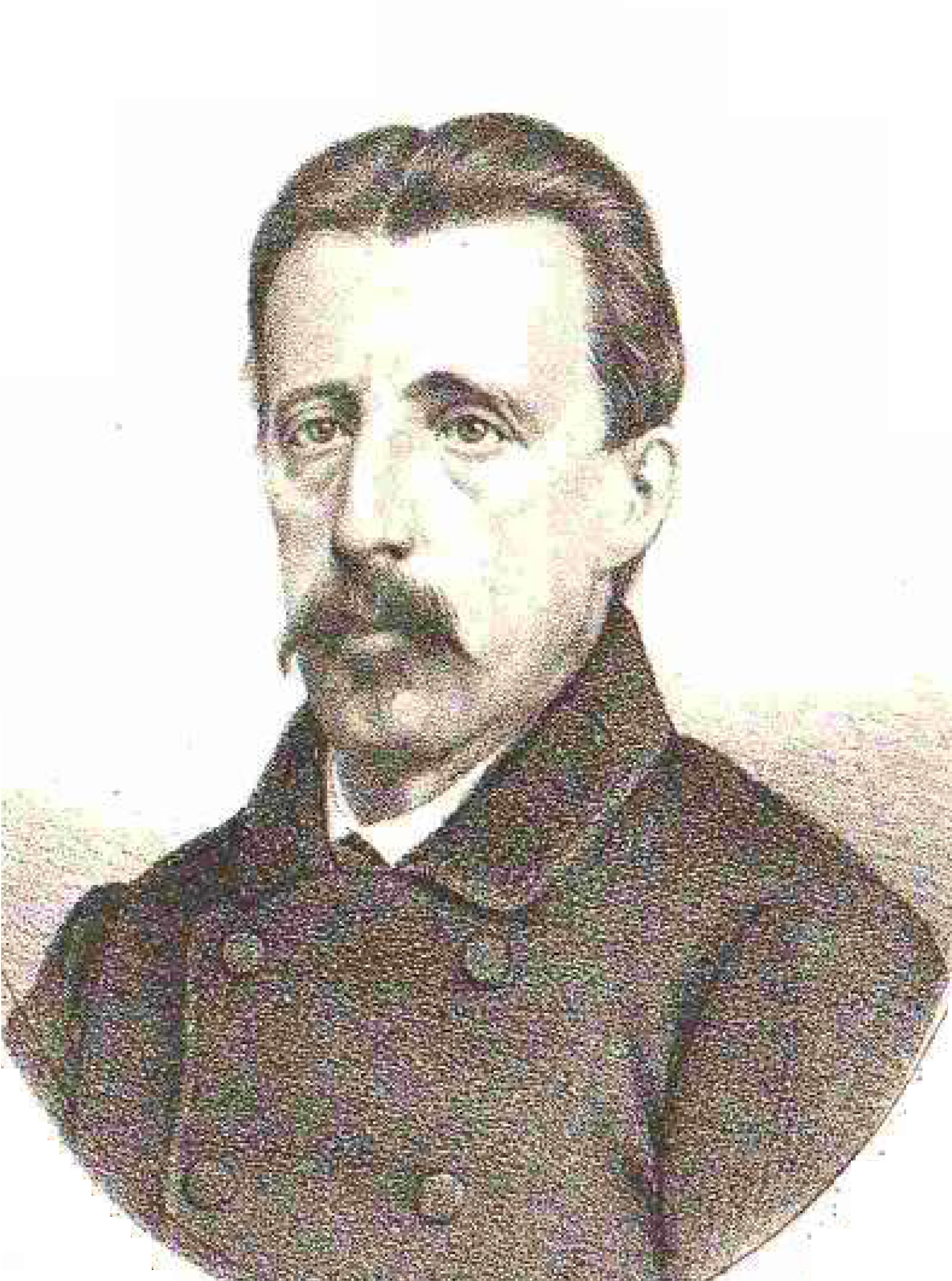
Portrait of Vildósola (1869), drawing and lithograph by Llanta.

Antonio Juan de Vildósola y Mier (1829-Bilbao, December 31, 1893) was a Spanish writer, politician and journalist.

== Biography ==
Born in 1829 in Bilbao, he completed his early education at the Colegio de San Ignacio de Loyola until the expulsion of the Jesuits in 1840. He later studied at a French school, studying French Diction and Music. He studied Philosophy for three years at the Bilbao College of Humanities attached to the University of Valladolid from 1841 to 1845. He then studied Law at the same school, obtaining his bachelor's degree from the University of Valladolid on September 28, 1849, completing his studies in Madrid and France.

On November 23, 1855, he applied for the position of diplomatic attaché in Vienna. Despite being royally appointed as a supernumerary diplomatic attaché without pay to Bern and Frankfurt on December 15, 1855, he did not attend. In 1856, he married the daughter of Pedro de la Hoz, editor of the Carlist newspaper La Esperanza.

Of traditionalist ideology, he was editor of La Esperanza, which he left, according to Antonio de Valbuena, due to disagreements with Pedro de la Hoz. He later became editor of La Regeneración (1860), Altar y Trono (1869), and La Fe (1875). He also collaborated with La Ilustración Católica and El Correo Español.

He was the translator of a Life of Our Lord Jesus Christ by the Frenchman Louis Veuillot. For questioning the legitimacy of Queen Isabella II, he was sentenced to three months in prison. After the Revolution of 1868, he published three pamphlets on current political events: The Spanish Solution in the King and in the Law (1868), The Appearances and Reality of the Dynastic Fusion (1869) and In the Light of the Fire. Last Barricades in Paris and First Restorations in Europe (1871), on the Paris Commune and in which he would interpret these events as an ultimate consequence of liberalism.

On the political level, he was a member of the Catholic-Monarchist Central Board and obtained a seat in the Cortes in the elections of 1869 for Bilbao and in those of 1871 and April 1872 for Guernica. During the vote on the election of Amadeo of Savoy as King of Spain, he threatened in the Cortes to fight him "by all means." He was imprisoned by the government after the outbreak of the Third Carlist War, despite his immunity as an elected deputy. He was later released and was able to travel north to the area controlled by the armed Carlists.

After the war, as editor of La Fé, he had a notorious clash with the editors of El Siglo Futuro, Cándido and Ramón Nocedal, who advocated a more intransigent stance within Carlism. He died in Bilbao on December 31, 1893.

== Works ==
- Life of Our Lord Jesus Christ (2nd ed., 1865), translated from a book by Louis Veuillot.
- The Spanish Solution in the King and in the Law (2nd ed., 1868).
- The Appearances and Reality of the Dynastic Fusion (1869).
- In the Light of the Fire: The Last Barricades in Paris and the First Restorations in Europe (1871).

== Bibliography ==
- Chacón Delgado, Pedro José (2015). "28. Antonio Juan de Vildósola Mier". Nobleza con Libertad. Biografía de la derecha vasca (publicado bajo una licencia CC BY-SA 3.0) (PDF) (in Spanish). Atxular Atea. pp. 299–307. ISBN 978-84-942480-4-7.
- Orobon, Marie Angèle (2003). "De l'histoire à la célébration: Commune de Paris et culture politique en Espagne". In Jean-René Aymes; Mariano Esteban de Vega (eds.). Francia en España, España en Francia. La historia de la relación cultural Hispano-Francesa (siglos XIX-XX) (in French). Presses de la Sorbonne Nouvelle y Universidad de Salamanca. pp. 127–144. ISBN 84-7800-678-8.
- Ossorio y Bernard, Manuel (1903). "Vildósola (Antonio Juan de)". Ensayo de un catálogo de periodistas españoles del siglo XIX. Madrid: Imprenta y litografía de J. Palacios.
- Urigüen, Begoña (1986). Orígenes y evolución de la derecha española: el neo-catolicismo. Madrid: CSIC. ISBN 84-00-06157-8.
- Urquijo, Felipe de (1880-06-22). "Don Antonio Juan de Vildósola". La Ilustración Española y Americana (in Spanish). XXIV (23). Madrid: 406. ISSN 1889-8394.
- Veuillot, Luis (1865). Vida de Nuestro Señor Jesucristo (in Spanish). [traducción de Antonio Juan de Vildósola] (2ª ed.). Madrid: Imprenta á cargo de D. Antonio Pérez Dubrull.
- Vildósola, Antonio Juan de (1868). La solución española en el rey y en la ley (in Spanish) (2ª ed.). Madrid: A. Perez Dubrull.
- Vildósola, Antonio Juan de (1869). Las apariencias y la realidad de la fusión dinástica (in Spanish). Madrid: A. Perez Dubrull.
