= Traditionalism =

Traditionalism is the adherence to traditional beliefs or practices. It may also refer to:

== Religion ==
- Traditional religion, a religion or belief associated with a particular ethnic group
- Traditionalism (19th-century Catholicism), a 19th-century theological current
- Traditionalist Catholicism, a movement that emphasizes beliefs, practices, customs, traditions, liturgical forms, devotions and presentations of teaching associated with the Catholic Church before the Second Vatican Council (1962–1965).
- Traditionalist Christianity, also known as Conservative Christianity
- Traditionalism (Islam), an early Islamic movement advocating reliance on the prophetic traditions (hadith)
- Traditionalist theology (Islam), a modern movement that rejects rationalistic theology (kalam)
- Traditionalism (Islam in Indonesia), an Indonesian Islamic movement upholding vernacular and syncretic traditions
- Traditionalism (perennialism), a school of religious interpretation originating with René Guénon

== Politics ==
- Traditionalist conservatism, a school concerned about traditional values, practical knowledge and spontaneous natural order
  - Traditionalist conservatism in the United States, a post-World War II American political philosophy
- Carlism, a 19th–20th century Spanish political movement related to Traditionalism
- Traditionalism (Spain), a Spanish political doctrine
- Trads (Hindutva), a loose group of alt-right activists and internet trolls within the Hindutva movement

== Other uses ==
- Traditionalist School (architecture), a movement in early 20th-century Dutch architecture
- Traditionalism Revisited, a 1957 album by American jazz musician Bob Brookmeyer

== See also ==
- Neo-traditionalism
- Radical Traditionalism
- Tradition (disambiguation)
- Trad
