= New Tradition (disambiguation) =

New Tradition may refer to:

- The New Tradition, a California barbershop quartet
- New Tradition Chorus, an Illinois men's barbershop chorus
- New Tradition, 2012 album by Dark New Day
- A New Tradition, 2001 EP album by Snailhouse
- New Traditions in East Asian Bar Bands, album by John Zorn
- New Kadampa Tradition, a global Buddhist organisation

== See also ==
- New Traditionalists, a 1981 album by Devo
- Neotraditional (disambiguation)
- Traditionalism (disambiguation)
