= Radical Traditionalism =

Radical Traditionalism may refer to:

- The Traditionalist School
- A far-right form of Traditionalist Catholicism
- An album by Ralph Shapey
