= Traditions (Bobby Womack album) =

Studio album by Bobby Womack
- Released: November 4, 1999
- Recorded: 1999
- Genres: R&B, Christmas
- Length: 59:32
- Label: The Right Stuff/Capitol/EMI Records
- Producer: Bobby Womack

Bobby Womack chronology
| Back to My Roots (1999) | Traditions (1999) | Christmas Album (2000) |

Professional ratings
Review scores
| Source | Rating |
|---|---|
| AllMusic | 3/5 stars |
| The Encyclopedia of Popular Music | 3/5 stars |

Traditions is the 22nd studio album by American musician Bobby Womack. The album was released on November 4, 1999, on The Right Stuff Records.

In a 2024 overview of Womack's output, Sebastian Zabel of Rolling Stone Germany wrote that "many of his albums of the 80s and 90s are weak; this one is weaker."

== Track listing ==
| No. | Title | Length |
|---|---|---|
| 1. | "Dear Santa Claus" | 3:50 |
| 2. | "This Christmas" | 3:28 |
| 3. | "Have Yourself a Merry Little Christmas" | 4:21 |
| 4. | "Christmas Ain't Christmas" | 2:59 |
| 5. | "White Christmas" | 3:13 |
| 6. | "The First Noel" | 2:53 |
| 7. | "Hark! The Herald Angels Sing" | 2:30 |
| 8. | "The Christmas Song (Chestnuts Roasting on an Open Fire)" | 5:13 |
| 9. | "Silent Night" | 3:47 |
| 10. | "Jingle Bells" | 2:58 |
| 11. | "Dear Santa Claus (Children's Version)" | 3:38 |
| 12. | "Winter Wonderland" | 3:05 |
| 13. | "O Holy Night" | 3:21 |
| 14. | "Rudolph the Red-Nosed Reindeer" | 3:06 |
| 15. | "Away in a Manger" | 2:52 |
| 16. | "Joy to the World" | 2:59 |
| 17. | "Auld Lang Syne" | 4:55 |
