= Traditionalism (Spain) =

Spanish political doctrine in the early 19th century

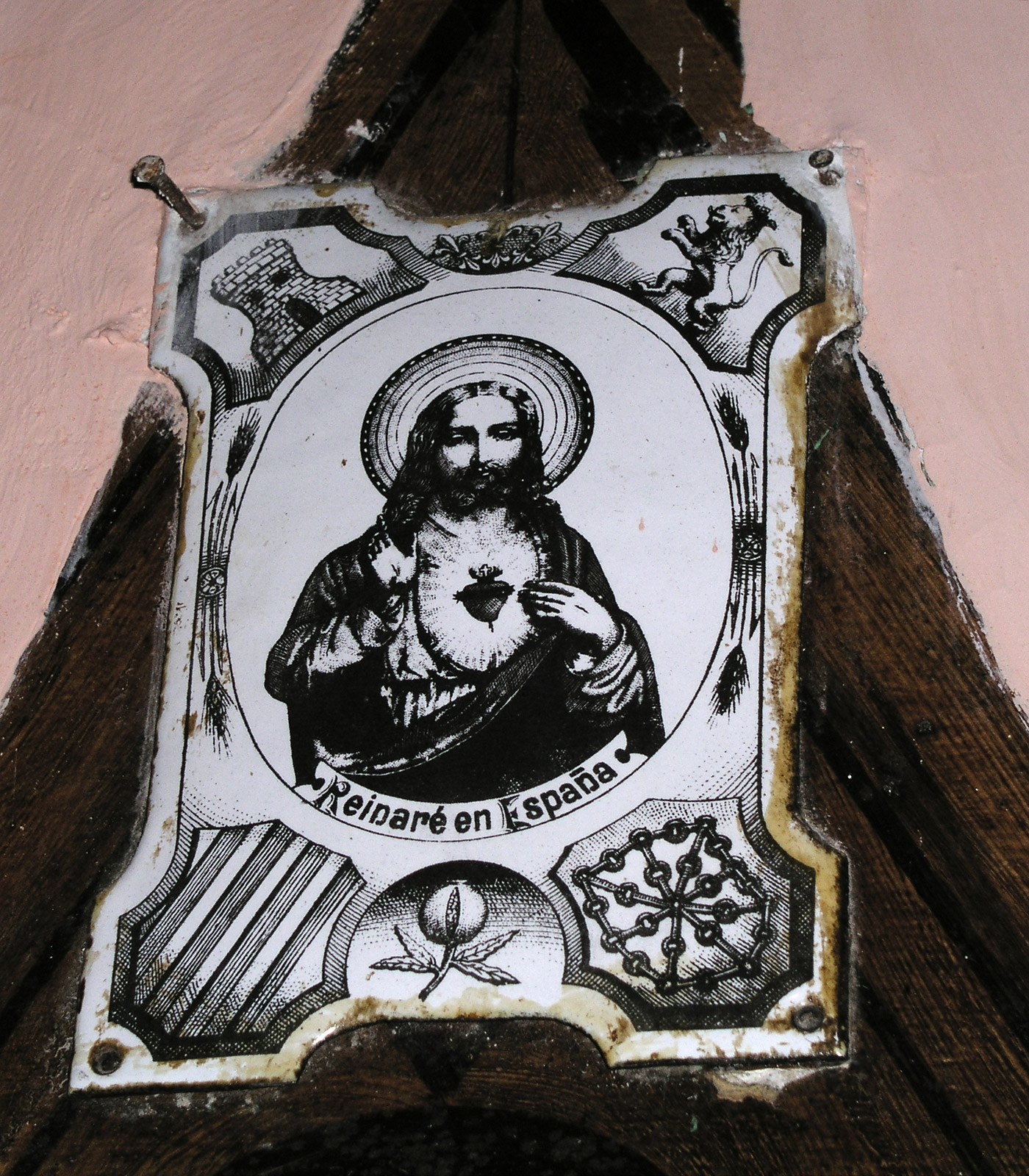
"I will reign in Spain", Great Promise of the Sacred Heart of Jesus to Padre Hoyos.

Traditionalism (Spanish: tradicionalismo) is a Spanish political doctrine formulated in the early 19th century and developed until today. It understands politics as implementing Catholic social teaching and the social kingship of Jesus Christ, with Catholicism as the state religion and Catholic religious criteria regulating public morality and every legal aspect of Spain. In practical terms it advocates a loosely organized monarchy combined with strong royal powers, with some checks and balances provided by organicist representation, and with society structured on a corporative basis. Traditionalism rejects democracy, human rights, constitution, universal suffrage, sovereignty of the people, division of powers, religious liberty, freedom of speech, equality of individuals, and parliamentarism. The doctrine was adopted as the theoretical platform of the Carlist socio-political movement, though it appeared also in a non-Carlist incarnation. Traditionalism has never exercised major influence among the Spanish governmental strata, yet periodically it was capable of mass mobilization and at times partially filtered into the ruling practice.

== History ==
Spanish Traditionalism is one of the oldest continuously proclaimed political doctrines in the world, its origins traced back to the late 18th century. In terms of intellectual grandeur the theory enjoyed its climax three times: in the 1840–1850s thanks to works of Jaime Balmes and Juan Donoso Cortés, in the 1890–1900s thanks to works of Enrique Gil Robles and Juan Vázquez de Mella, and in the 1950–1960s thanks to works of Francisco Elías de Tejada and Rafael Gambra. In terms of impact on real-life politics the concept exercised most visible influence during the rule of Ramón Narváez in the 1840–1850s, Miguel Primo de Rivera in the 1920s and Francisco Franco in the 1940–1950s.

=== Antecedents ===
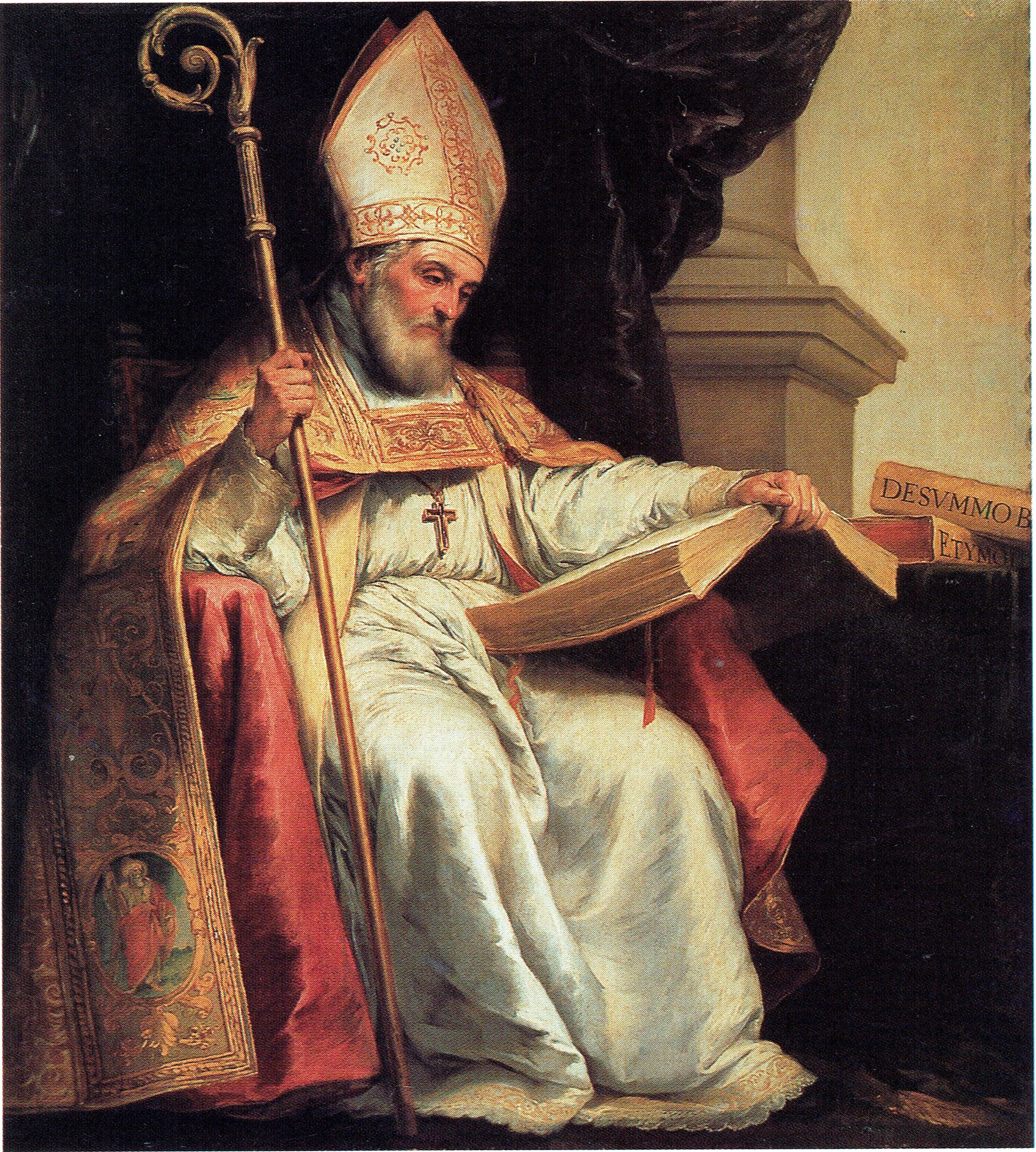
Isidore of Seville

Spanish Traditionalism is almost unanimously considered a doctrine born in the 19th century, though there are vastly different views as to what intellectual phenomena could be viewed as its antecedents. Apart from isolated cases of going back to pre-Christian times, the most far-reaching perspective is the one which identifies the roots of Traditionalism with beginnings of Spanish political tradition, the latter embodied in works of Isidore of Seville. Together with works of other minor Spanish medieval scholars it reportedly enjoyed its climax in the 16th century, from Fernando de Roa to Antonio de Guevara to Juan de Mariana, and laid foundations for Traditionalist understanding of power and politics, derived from Christian and natural order. In the 17th century it was enriched with concepts related to intermediary bodies, political representation and limitation of royal powers, all thanks to works of Juan Fernández de Madrano, Tomás Cerdán de Tallada, Agustín de Rojas Villandrando, Juan de Madariaga, Francisco de Sánchez de la Barreda, Juan de Palafox y Mendoza and especially Francisco de Quevedo. Other scholars tend to be skeptical of such a far-reaching approach and suggest that it confuses Traditionalism with Spanish political tradition.

According to a somewhat competitive perspective antecedents of Traditionalism can be identified no sooner than in the 18th century, as their emergence was conditioned by experience of discontinuity between the past and the present. The first manifestations of pre-Traditionalist thought were born – the theory goes – as opposition to modernizing Borbonic reforms imported from France and resulting in buildup of an absolute monarchy. Initially the critics focused on intended homogenization of state; writers and scholars like Juan Manuel Fernández Pacheco, Narciso Feliú de la Peña and Manuel Larramendi objected to centralization efforts of Felipe V and voiced in favor of traditional local establishments. In the mid-18th century the criticism shifted to technocratic mode of governing; Andrés Piquer Arrufat, Nuix de Perpiñá brothers and especially Fernando de Ceballos y Mier confronted rising "despotismo ministerial", perceived as a result of arrogant Enlightenment. Indeed, some scholars emphasize the anti-Enlightenment spirit of 18th-century Traditionalists; others prefer to underline rather their anti-absolutist stand. In none of the above cases a concise lecture of competitive political theory was offered; instead, the authors listed consciously exploited multifold differences between the new system and traditional Spanish establishments.

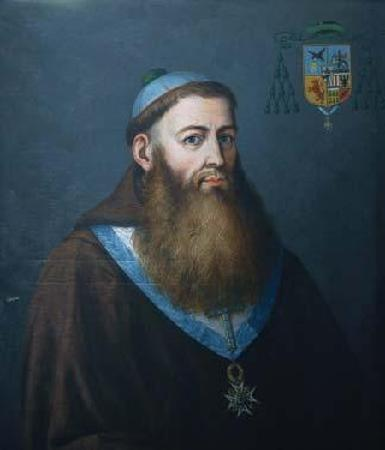
Rafael de Vélez

Both the above perspectives are rejected by scholars sharing perhaps the most popular theory, namely that one can not speak of Traditionalism prior to the French Revolution. It was the 1789 events in France which triggered antecedents of Traditionalism, a theory founded on the concept of counter-revolution. Within this perspective it is the revolution, not Absolutism, that formed the key Traditionalist counterpoint of reference. The proponents listed are Lorenzo Hervás Panduro, Francisco Alvarado y Téllez, Diego José de Cádiz and Rafael de Vélez; their refutations of revolutionary concepts were based on Spanish political tradition and offered first components of what would later become a Traditionalist doctrine. According to some scholars Traditionalism as political option for the first time emerged represented by minority deputies at the 1812 Cortes of Cádiz; a document considered by some the first political lecture of Traditionalism is the 1814 Manifiesto de los Persas, the following ones to be mentioned having been the 1822 Manifiesto del Barón de Eroles and the 1826 Manifiesto de los Realistas Puros. However, discussing the early 19th century most scholars prefer rather to speak of "realistas", "ultras", "apostólicos" or "serviles", and apply the name of Traditionalists to the period starting in the 1830s. Politically, the group tended to swallow their anti-absolutism when supporting Fernando VII in his anti-revolutionary zeal; it was only in the late 1820s that the king started to be viewed as wavering and unreliable, with sympathy gradually shifting to his firmly reactionary brother, Don Carlos.

=== Isabelline era ===
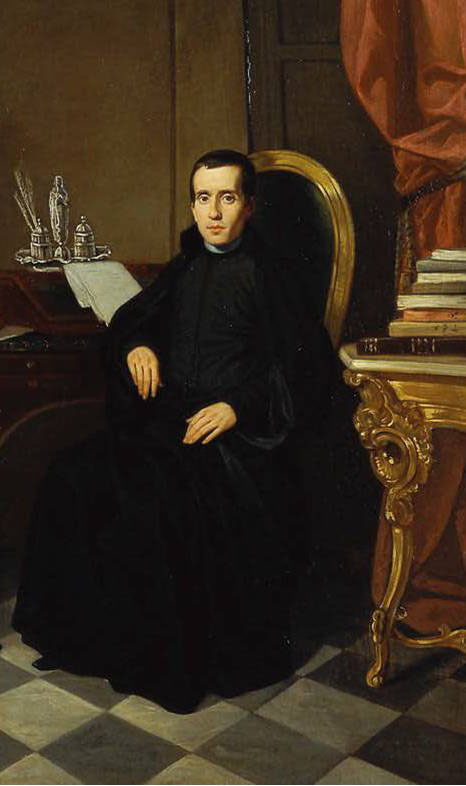
Jaime Balmes

The 1833 death of Fernando VII triggered dynastical crisis and a civil war, to become known as the First Carlist War. Don Carlos issued a number of manifiestos; they fell short of outlining a political vision and tended to focus on advertising his succession claims, though they also lambasted his opponents as masonic conspirators pitted against religion, monarchy, fueros and traditional liberties. Most of the former realistas sided with Don Carlos and politically his faction immediately assumed firmly ultraconservative flavor, directed against slightest manifestations of Liberalism embraced by the opposite faction of María Cristina; in terms of popular support the rural masses were attracted to the camp of Don Carlos mostly by religious zeal and perceived threat of foreign-inspired secularization. However, most present-day scholars refer to his supporters as Carlists; cases of applying the Traditionalist denomination are rather exceptional. Though some students have no doubt that political outlook of Don Carlos and his followers was founded on pre-Traditionalist realist antecedents, no Carlist author of the 1830s is credited for developing a Traditionalist outlook.

A fully-fledged Traditionalism is usually noted as born in the 1840s and 1850s, fathered by two independently working scholars, Jaime Balmes y Urpiá and Juan Donoso Cortés. Both formulated largely overlapping theoretical systems accommodating traditional Catholicism within constitutional framework of the Isabelline monarchy. Neither defined himself as Traditionalist, and the name is applied retroactively. Politically Balmes sought rapprochement between the Carlists and the Isabellites; due to his somewhat eclectic background and conciliatory efforts, his vision is named "tradicionalismo evolutivo". "Tradicionalismo radical" is the name applied to the opus of vehemently anti-Carlist Donoso Cortés; radical refers mostly to acknowledgement of a would be dictatorial regime, acceptable in case everything else fails and an apocalyptic Socialist threat is eminent, a clear echo of the 1848 events in Paris. Unlike Balmes, Donoso was read and known across Europe, including politicians like Metternich. Though in the official Spanish diplomatic service, Donoso held no important state jobs, built no strictly political following and his impact on daily politics was visible but not decisive, related to co-drafting of 1845 constitution, the 1851 concordat and his friendship with Bravo Murillo. Donoso was the first theorist dubbed Traditionalist, the term starting to appear in the public discourse in the early 1850s.

The Carlist version of Traditionalism was developed mostly by vast array of periodicals, headed by La Esperanza and its chief, Pedro de la Hoz. The first complete Carlist lecture of Traditionalism – by some considered the first complete lecture of Traditionalism at all, preceding those of Balmes and Donoso – is supposed to be the 1843 work of Magín Ferrer. Other authors who ventured to offer a more systematic lecture, like Vicente Pou, did not make a major impact. Discussing ongoing politics Carlist Traditionalism focused on negative points of reference, opposing Liberalism and its incarnations like constitutionalism, electoral system, ongoing secularization of state, desamortización and centralization. Concepts attributed to the claimants and named minimalismo and montemolinismo are political strategies rather than theories; the most lasting contribution to Carlist Traditionalism of the era was a so-called double legitimacy theory.

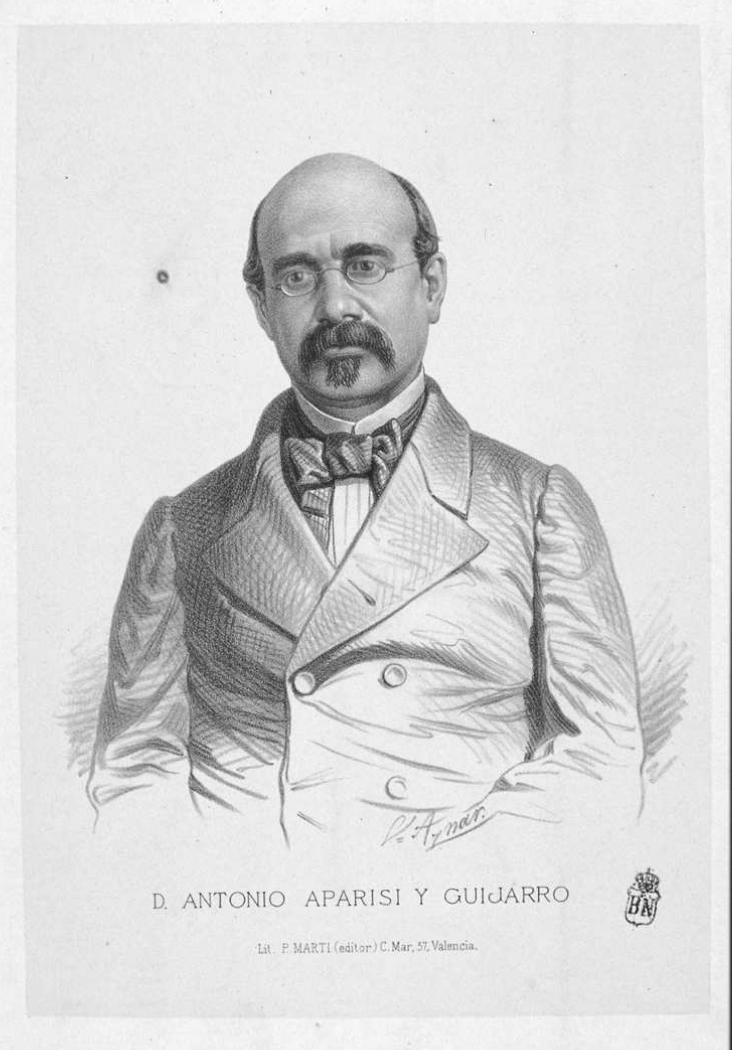
Antonio Aparisi

In the 1860s the Isabelline and the Carlist versions of Traditionalism drew closer thanks to followers of Donoso called neocatólicos; the group comprised parliamentarians like Antonio Aparisi Guijarro and Cándido Nocedal, publishers like Gabino Tejado, Eduardo González Pedroso, Antonio Vildósola and Francisco Navarro Villoslada, or academics like Juan Ortí Lara. In terms of intellectual format none of them is considered comparable to Balmes or Donoso. Together they formed a group which left a clear mark on politics of the late Isabelline era, mounting a last-minute attempt to save the crumbling monarchy by reformatting it along Traditionalist, anti-Liberal lines. Having seen their efforts frustrated by the early 1870s most of the Neos neared Carlism in the first ever Traditionalist organization, named Comunión Católico-Monárquica. In the public discourse Traditionalism was already firmly and explicitly pitted against Liberalism. At that time it was only occasionally and loosely getting associated with Carlism, though "monarquía tradicional" became common reference of Carlist press and politicians.

=== War and Restoration ===
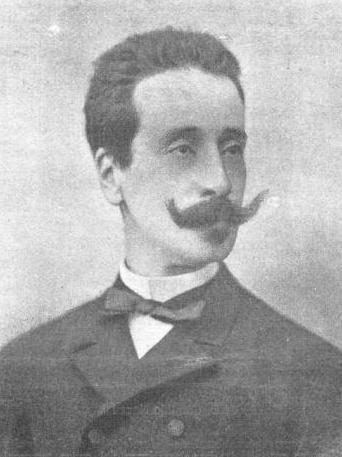
Ramón Nocedal

In the 1870s Traditionalism was first tested as operational political concept; during the Third Carlist War territories controlled by the Carlists witnessed emergence of their state structure, though short duration, wartime footing and limited geographical scope do not allow definite conclusions. The Carlist version of Traditionalism is already considered about complete at the time, embodied in political manifestos, press propaganda, theoretical works and – last but not least – in popular sentiment, expressed as a motto which keeps defining the movement until today: "Dios – Patria – Rey".

Complete amalgamation of Traditionalism and Carlism was far from accomplished, the key difference having been the legitimist and dynastic issue. It was first demonstrated by Alejandro Pidal, who without renouncing his fundamentally Traditionalist outlook in the early 1880s agreed to accept Liberal constitutional realm of Restauración as a hypothesis, rendered attractive by the vision of Catholic Unity; the current he launched is named as Pidalismo. Far more important was the late 1880s secession of the so-called Integrists, headed by Ramón Nocedal. The faction de-emphasized all non-religious threads, including the legitimist one, but unlike the Pidalistas they adopted a vehemently intransigent stand towards the Restoration regime. Though there were many prolific Integrist writers active in their network of periodicals, Integrist version of Traditionalism failed to produce its systematic theoretical lecture; the closest thing was an 1884 booklet by Felix Sardá y Salvany. It is also the Integrists who first started to use the term Traditionalism as their auto-definition, denying also Traditionalist credentials to the Carlists. The scheme was widely accepted in public discourse, and in the late 19th century Spanish press and politicians applied the Traditionalist denomination chiefly to the Integrists. This nomenclature is at times adopted also by present-day scholars.

A scholar considered by some the greatest figure of late 19th century Traditionalism is Marcelino Menéndez Pelayo, who published most of his key works in the 1880s and 1890s. Historian of political thought and literary critic rather than a political theorist himself, he championed Traditionalism as a cultural approach, defined as constant defense of orthodoxy based on Catholicism though embodied in vastly different locals realms of Hispanidad. Erudite to the extreme politically he neared the Conservatives and briefly served as MP; some scholars refer also to "menendezpelayismo político"; most, however, limit themselves to "menendezpelayismo". Some deny him Traditionalist credentials altogether.

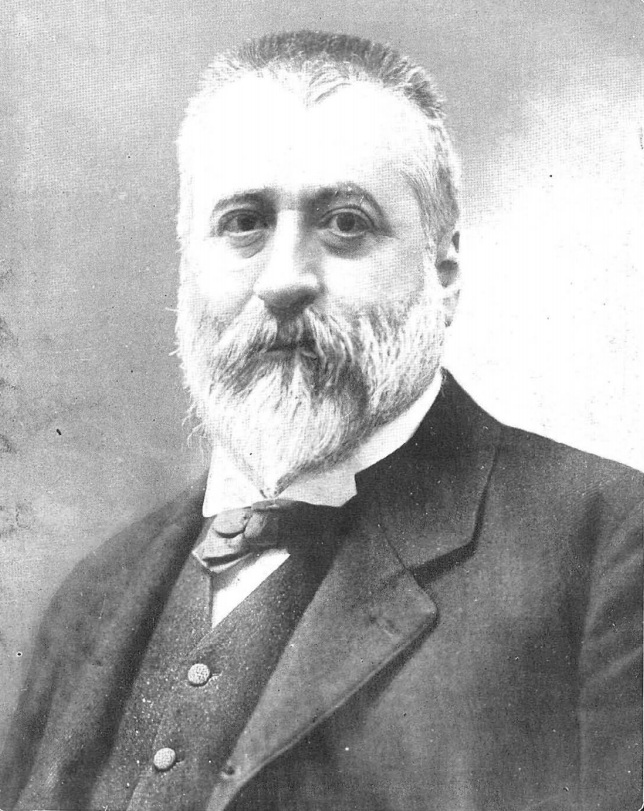
Marcelino Menéndez Pelayo

Until the very late 1890s political Traditionalism lacked a complete lecture comparable to works of Balmes and Donoso; authors like Luis Llauder Dalmases produced general overviews of smaller scope or systematically contributed minor theoretical pieces to the press. This changed at the turn of the centuries thanks to two figures who renovated Traditionalist thought: Enrique Gil Robles and Juan Vázquez de Mella. Both offered complete and similar political visions; the former produced it as a single lengthy treaty accompanied by few minor works and the latter as massive and a rather loose collection of press contributions, parliamentary addresses and booklets. Some scholars consider de Mella a follower of Gil, others believe that Traditionalism achieved its most-refined embodiment in the Mellista thought. Gil remained a scholar with impact mostly in academic realm; following death in 1908 his work was soon eclipsed by that of de Mella, who gained high profile as deputy and politician and became sort of a celebrity. Politically Gil remained in-between Integrism and mainstream Carlism. De Mella for some 25 years was considered the key Carlist theorist until in 1919 he broke away. The short-lived party he founded was named Partido Católico-Tradicionalista; in popular discourse it was referred to as Mellistas or Tradicionalistas, while the Carlists of the era – still sharing the same Traditionalist outlook – were usually named Jaimistas.

=== Dictatorship era ===
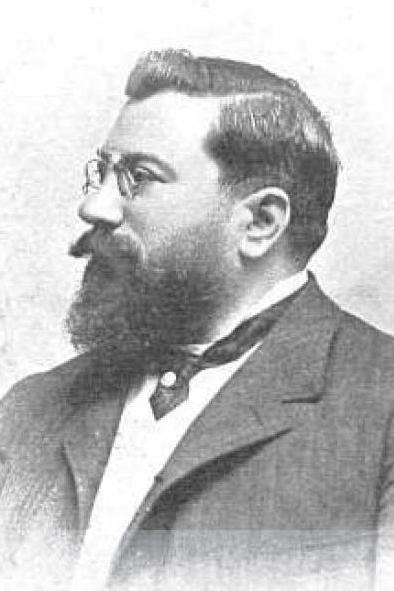
Juan Vázquez de Mella

Until his death in 1928 de Mella remained the undisputed highest authority on Traditionalist political thought, though since the early 1920s he was withdrawing into privacy. He dismissed the Primo de Rivera dictatorship with contempt as an attempt falling dramatically short of a fundamental change needed. The Jaimists cautiously welcomed the coup as a step in the right direction, but in the mid-1920 they got disillusioned and moved into opposition. It was the disciple of de Mella, de facto intellectual leader of Mellista Traditionalists and a political theorist himself, Víctor Pradera, who kept supporting Primo and turned into one of his key political advisors. Perhaps never before and never afterwards stood any Traditionalist closer to the source of power than Pradera did in the mid-1920s, supplying the dictator with memoranda advocating features of Traditionalist regime; to some authors he became a reference point for primoderiverismo, even though in the late 1920s he was increasingly disappointed with centralization and the facade quasi-party, Unión Patriótica.

There is little agreement about the figure of Angel Herrera Oria, founder and the moving spirit of ACNDP. Some students consider him representative of Catholic Traditionalism rooted in Balmesian and Menendezpelayista schools. Others set him on the antipodes of Traditionalism, noting that minimalist, democratic and accidentalist format of his activity should be rather associated with modern Catholic groupings. Acción Española, a formation set up during the Republic years in the early 1930s, was according to different authors either an eclectic synthesis of various Traditionalist schools, or political menendezpelayismo, or neo-Traditionalism – especially in case of Ramiro Maeztu – or a blend of Traditionalism and Maurras-inspired nationalism. It remained politically competitive to re-united Carlism, which having gathered together Jaimistas, Mellistas and Integristas operated under the name of Comunión Tradicionalista. Traditionalist references are at times applied to CEDA. Upon the 1935 publication of his key theoretical work Pradera emerged as the new intellectual champion of Traditionalism.

Outbreak of the Civil War triggered emergence of some re-definitions of Traditionalism and two major synthetic works by Luis Hernando de Larramendi and Marcial Solana González-Camino. The late 1930s and 1940s, however, contributed rather to general bewilderment in the Traditionalist camp. On the one hand, the emergent Francoism posed as synthesis of all genuinely Spanish political schools, including Traditionalism; the late Pradera was elevated to one of the founding fathers of the system, and some Traditionalist references were ostentatiously boasted as components of the new Spain. On the other hand, marginalized Carlism went into intra-system opposition and its leaders lambasted Francoism as incompatible with Traditionalist political outlook.

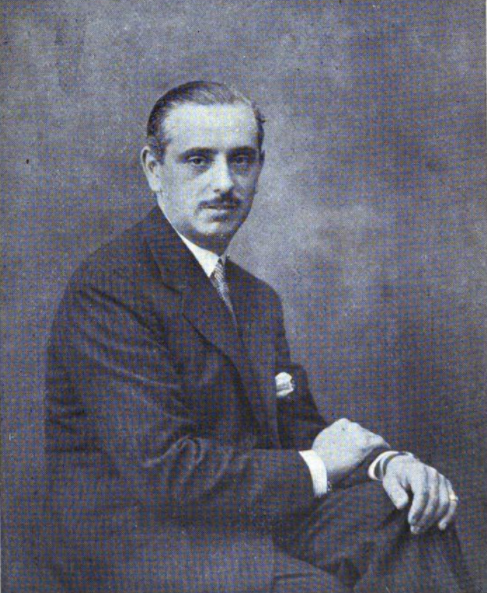
José María Pemán

The doctrine demonstrated first signs of revitalization in the late 1940s, marked by emergence of a review Arbor and works of Rafael Calvo Serer, joined by Vicente Marrero and Florentino Pérez Embid. Own approaches to Traditionalism were fathered by Eugenio Vegas Latapié, Leopoldo Eulogio Palacios, Eugenio d'Ors Rovira and Manuel Garcia Morente, with a spirit of neotradicionalismo in the Juanista camp championed by José María Pemán. In the mid-1950s a Carlism-related breed of Traditionalist theorists entered the scene and it is they who for the third time brought Traditionalism to its highest intellectual standards. The one who stands out is Francisco Elías de Tejada, mostly a theorist of law, though also historian and theorist of political thought; Rafael Gambra Ciudad is perhaps best described as an anthropologist, Juan Vallet de Goytisolo and Alvaro d'Ors Pérez-Peix made their names as jurists and philosophers and Francisco Canals Vidal excelled as philosopher, theologian and historian. Their numerous works, some of them monumental in size, appeared mostly during the 1960s and 1970s, their scale and refined in-depth scope contrasting sharply with demise of Traditionalism as a political force.

=== Present days ===
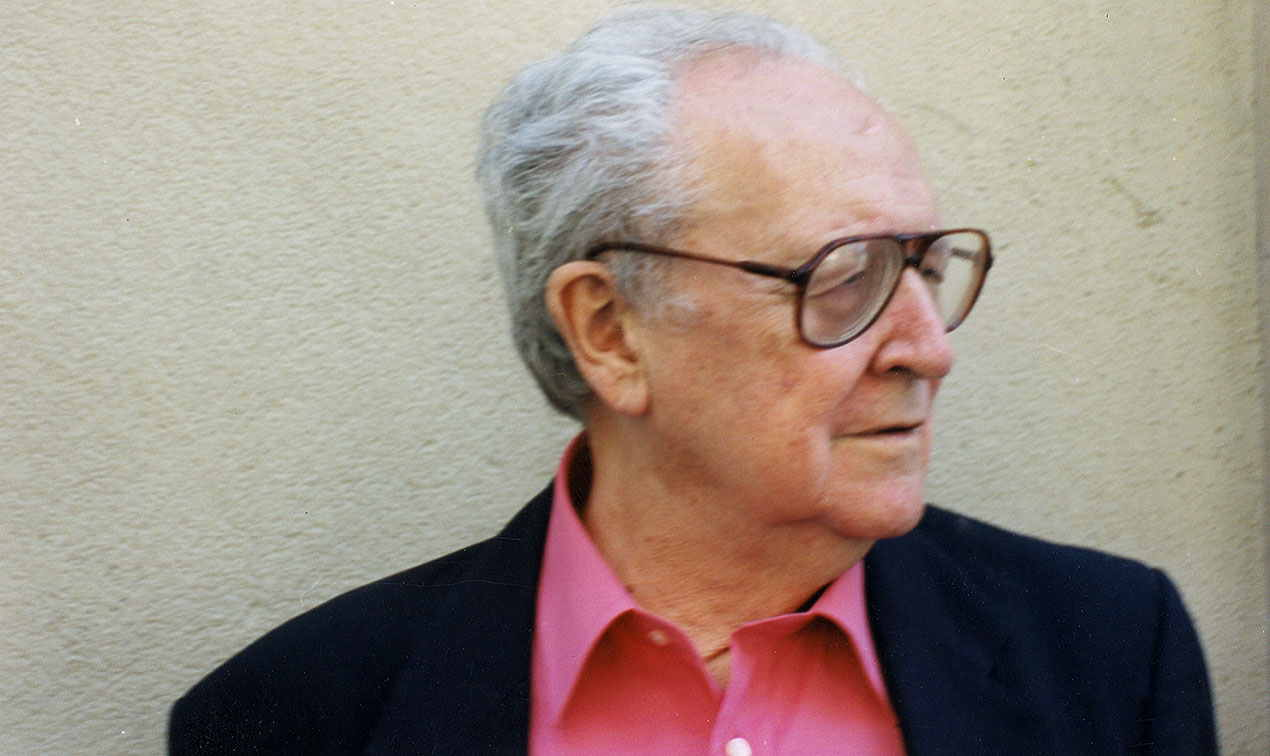
Ignacio Hernando de Larramendi

Following the death of Franco, Traditionalism remained on the sidelines of national politics; in the late 1970s numerous Carlist grouplets remained a third-rate extra-parliamentarian force, while Traditionalism-flavored post-Francoist Unión Nacional Española of Gonzalo Fernandéz de la Mora registered few deputies and disintegrated before 1980.

Most Traditionalist authors active during late Francoism remained active also after the fall of the regime; some, like Goytisolo, d'Ors or Canals, published their best known works in the late 1970s, in the 1980s or afterwards. They were joined by a new generation of authors, who started to publish in the last two decades of the 20th century, most of them scholars rather than political theorists and militants; the best known ones are a jurist and philosopher Miguel Ayuso Torres, historian Andrés Gambra Gutierrez and philosopher José Miguel Gambra Gutierrez. Their contribution is mostly about systematization of existing heritage rather than about proposing own visions of political system, though Ayuso's recent works on public power and constitutionalism form part of normative Traditionalist discourse of politics. An own, detailed and holistic view of Traditionalism-based political organisation for the 21st century Spain was contributed in the late 1990s in a 3-volume opus by Ignacio Hernando de Larramendi, but it made little impact even within the Traditionalist realm. A rather derogatory term "neotradicionalismo" has been coined to denote 21st century Traditionalist approach to Carlist history.

The institutional Traditionalist realm itself is made of a number of institutions, periodicals and other initiatives. Politically it is headed by two groupings, Comunión Tradicionalista Carlista and Comunión Tradicionalista; the key differences are that the former does not admit allegiance to any claimant or dynasty while the latter supports leadership of Sixto Enrique de Borbón, and that the former remains firmly within Vatican-defined orthodoxy while the latter is highly sympathetic towards the FSSX format of Catholicism. Both maintain their websites and social media profiles, issue bulletins, organize various types of public events and at times take part in elections.

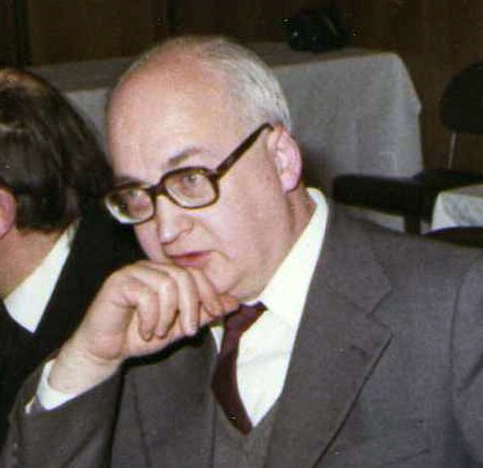
Francisco Canals Vidal

Key non-political institutions more or less flavored with Traditionalism are Fundación Ignacio Larramendi, Fundación Elías de Tejada, Centro de Estudios Históricos y Políticos General Zumalacárregui, Consejo de Estudios Hispánicos Felipe II, Fundación Speiro and Fundación Luis de Trelles; they issue own periodicals, stage cultural events, organize scientific conferences and remain active in cyberspace. Some of them maintain publishing houses and award prizes. Among numerous ephemeral periodicals and mostly electronic bulletins (Tradición Viva, Ahora) the ones which stand out for continuity and quality are Verbo, Anales de Fundación Francisco Elías de Tejada, Aportes and Fuego y Raya. In popular public discourse Traditionalism is represented mostly by an array of electronic services, maintained by individuals, Carlist círculos, various organizations or informal groupings, and formatted as portals, fora, blogs, shared-content sites, news etc.

== Doctrine ==
Longevity of Traditionalism poses two major problems for those willing to discuss its theoretical contents: how to define its scope and how to how to define its essential elements. In case of outward-leaning scholarly approaches the theory is defined very broadly and the term "Traditionalist" could be applied generously, also to personalities like Fernando VII or Francisco Franco; some historians see Spanish traditionalism very broadly as a general anti-liberal cultural sentiment. In case of inward-leaning approaches the theory is narrowed, generally to Carlism though in some cases even down to its branches. Scaled down to a non-reducible minimum, Traditionalism is politics understood as implementation of social kingship of Jesus Christ; in practical terms it stands for a loosely organized confessional monarchy with strong royal power, with some checks-and-balances provided by organicist representation and with society organized on a corporative basis.

=== Origin of power and monarchy ===
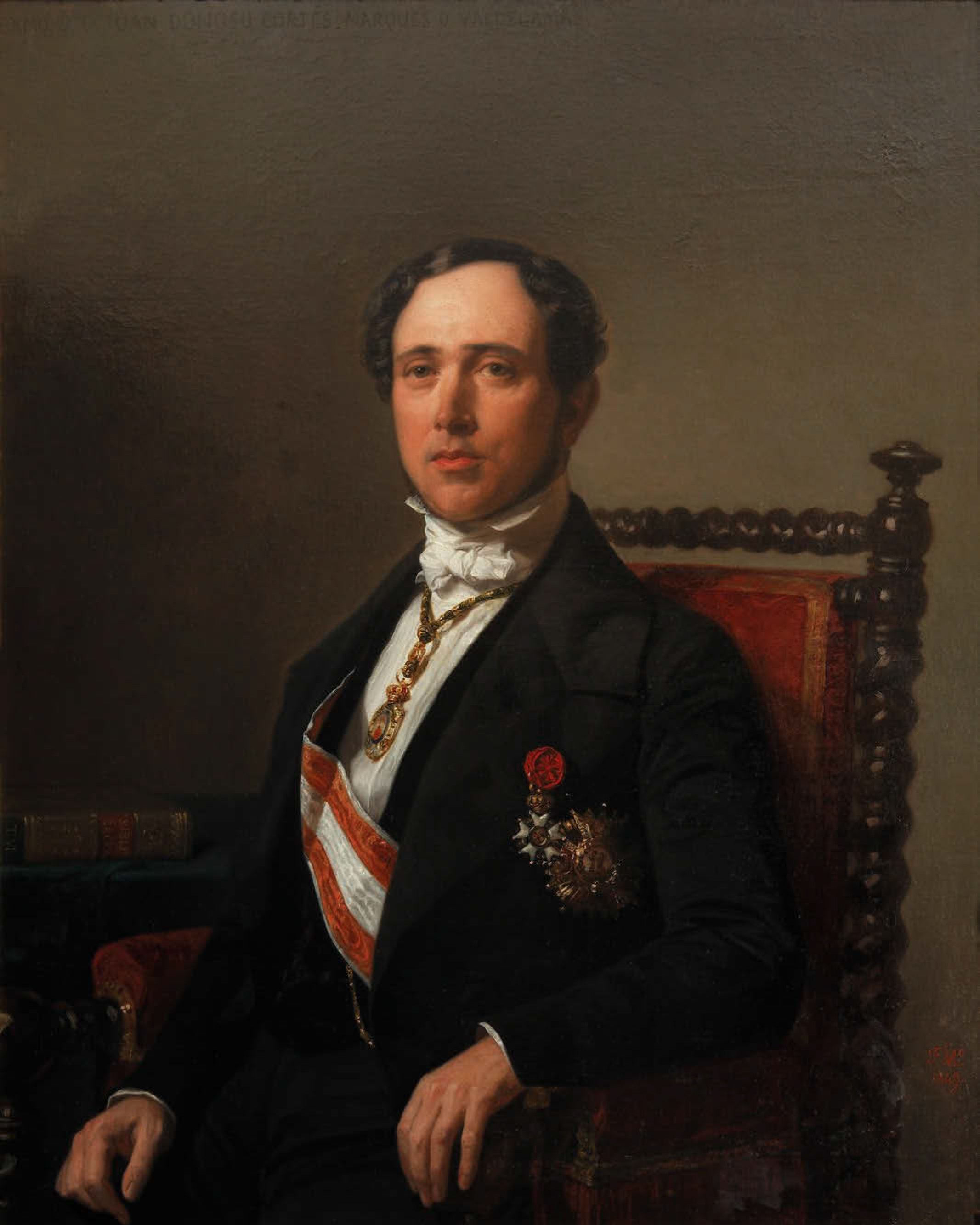
Juan Donoso Cortés

The Traditionalist doctrine starts with philosophical acknowledgement that God is the beginning of all things, not only as a creator but also a lawmaker. According to the theory, mankind emerged as a result of divine will and developed only when adhering to divine rules, since the truth is accessible to a man only by means of Revelation. As humanity was maturing people were organizing their communities, and the question of public power emerged having been natural result of their advancement. Some Traditionalists presented the process as social structures built from the bottom until topped by institution of a monarchy, some prefer the option that people entrusted power to kings. This way or another, legitimate monarchical power was presented as resulting from human and social development in line with godly spirit, natural law declared a source of royal legitimacy. The original political sin of a man was defined as looking for law beyond Revelation, which led to human usurpation. Attempts to define own rules – the Traditionalist reading goes – produced emergence of illegitimate political regimes; examples are despotic tyrants who claimed own legitimacy or societies, who declared themselves the ultimate source of power. At this point Carlist theorists advanced their own dynastic theory, denying legitimacy to descendants of Fernando VII.

Monarchy not always has been treated in Traditionalist thought with the same emphasis. In general, the focus on royalty decreased over time; while the cornerstone of theories launched in the mid-19th century, in the mid-20th century it gave way to society as an object of primary attention. As exception there were also theorists counted among Traditionalists who remained close to adopting an accidentalist principle. However, it is generally assumed that monarchism formed one of the key points of the theory, with monarchy approached as an ultimate and united social body and not infrequently viewed in transcendent terms. As a king was supposed to top the political structure, in general sovereignty was placed exclusively with him. Most Traditionalists claimed that fragmented sovereignty – e.g. shared with a nation or its representative bodies in constitutional monarchy – is not possible, though some claimed that while a king enjoys political sovereignty, a society enjoys a separate social sovereignty, understood as capacity to govern itself within limits traditionally developed for its components.

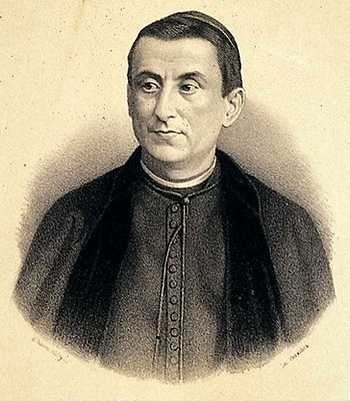
Vicente Manterola

Traditionalist concept of monarchic rule embraced a doctrine of integral and undivided public power; division into legislative, executive and judicial branches was rejected. In some writings this is literally referred to as "absolute" rule, which prompted some historians to conclude that Traditionalism was a branch of Absolutism; many others, however, underline that the two should not be confused. Neither rejection of division of powers nor the theory of unshared political sovereignty led to the doctrine of unlimited royal powers; quite to the contrary, most Traditionalists – with somewhat less focus on this issue in the first half of the 19th century – emphatically claimed that a king can rule only within strict limits. They are set principally by 3 factors: natural law as defined in divine order, fundamental laws of Spain and self-government of groups forming the society. A king who reaches beyond limits becomes not only a tyrant but also a heretic and may be overthrown.

=== Religion ===
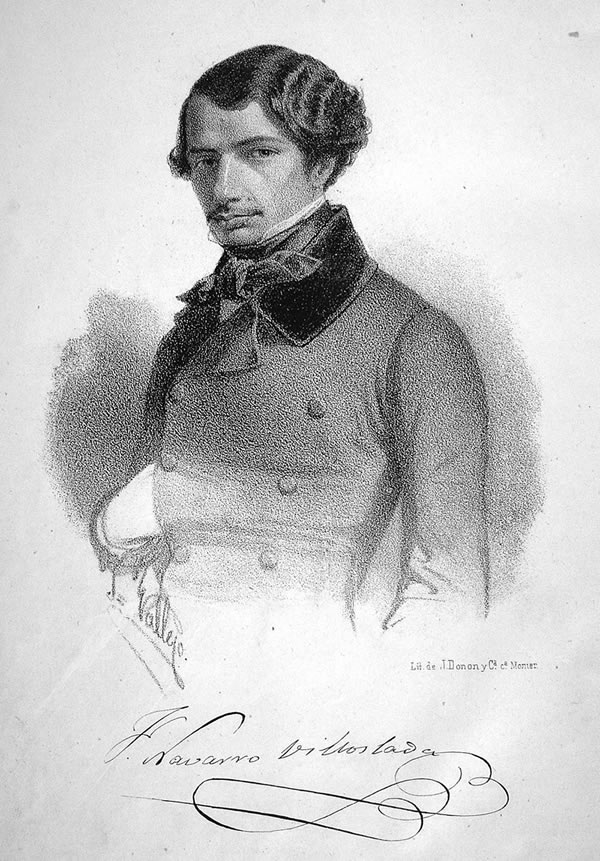
Francisco Navarro Villoslada

The Traditionalist political doctrine is theocentrist; it stems from acknowledgement that the entire human order must be based on God as taught by the Roman Catholic Church. God – with particular emphasis on Jesus Christ – is considered the beginning, the means and the objective of politics. This general concept was neared with various detail, though a widely adopted claim is that the purpose of politics is to establish a social kingship of Jesus Christ, a community strictly adhering to Christian principles. An ideal political regime is supposed to be means of achieving this objective; a Traditionalist monarchy is hence referred to as a katechon, the entity upholding Christianity and fighting the antichrist. Such a monarchy – and the Spanish one in particular – is also supposed to be missionary, as it is focused on spread of Christianity. Some Traditionalist theorists considered this feature the very nucleus of Hispanidad, a metaphoric soul of Hispanic cultural tradition.

In historiography there are abundant references to theocratic nature of Traditionalism, especially in its Carlist incarnation, and this opinion has even made it to college textbooks, though some scholars demonstrate caution and some reserve the term only for certain branches of Traditionalism. Scholars focusing on Spanish political thought do not confirm such a qualification, pointing that a Traditionalist monarchy is to be ruled by a king and various lay intermediary bodies, not by a religious hierarchy, and that the state and the Church have to remain two distinct institutions. Traditionalist theorists emphatically confirmed that a state must be based on Christian orthodoxy, that politics and religion are inseparable in terms of their principles and that the Church might and should influence politics, but their prevailing opinion was that the Church should also stay clear of exercising direct political power. However, in terms of praxis Traditionalists advocated a number of arrangements endorsing Church's participation in power structures, be it re-establishment of the Inquisition in the early 19th century or default presence of hierarchs in bodies like Cortes or Royal Council later on.

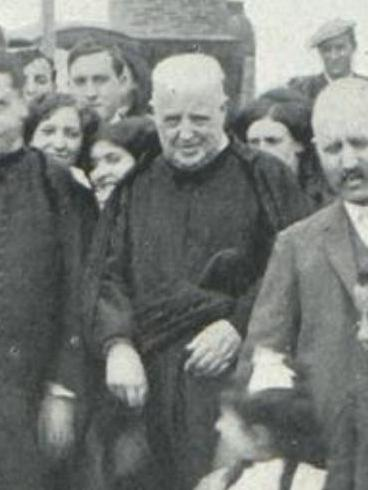
Fèlix Sardà i Salvany

Though distinct and independent as institutions, the state and the Church are not supposed to be separate; the Traditionalist monarchy is a confessional state, with Church enjoying political, economic and otherwise support of the state, and the state enjoying pastoral support of the Church. The Church is supposed to retain economic autonomy; expropriations of religious properties, carried out in mid-decades of the 19th century, were viewed as assault on fundamental laws. Certain areas of public life, especially culture and education, were approached as jointly controlled by state and Church, though visions as to specific regulations might have differed. Common public orthodoxy requires that no freedom of religion or freedom of press is allowed, though confessions other than Roman Catholicism are admitted if practiced in private.

The Traditionalist vision of religion and Church was incompatible either with Conservative, Liberal or Christian Democratic principles, lambasted as anti-Christian and revolutionary. In the mid-20th century it also proved incompatible with the official Vatican outlook, and release of Dignitatis Humanae was a major blow to Spanish Traditionalism. Some of its pundits remained at the verge of breaching loyalty to the popes and there were even signs of Traditionalist anti-clericalism emerging. Until today one of the two Traditionalist political groupings remains highly sympathetic to religious Traditionalism of FSSPX, which proves that though Traditionalism at times approached Ultramontanism, they can by no means by equaled. Non-Catholic Traditionalism has never taken root in Spain; though in the 1920s and 1930s some Traditionalism-leaning theorists and politicians demonstrated sympathy for Maurras-inspired concepts, later on it was generally outwardly and vehemently rejected as Left-wing ideas in disguise.

=== State ===
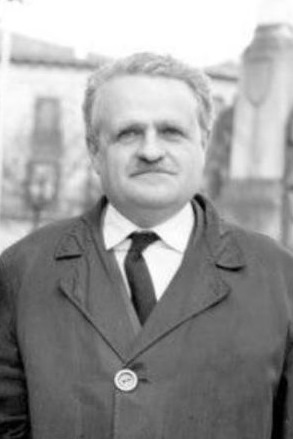
Alvaro d'Ors

Unlike the questions of monarchy or society, this of a state has usually been played down by Traditionalist writers; the phenomenon has even prompted one of their present-day theorists to make a reservation that Traditionalists are not enemies of the state. In fact, they saw state as a structure secondary and subordinate to a society and were careful to lambast all cases of reverting the order, be it "estadolatría moderna" of Hobbes and Machiavelli or totalitarian 20th century regimes. The state is supposed to be a lightweight superstructure over the existing social structures, sort of a society of societies; it is not embodiment of sovereignty in Bodinian sense, but rather a combined function of social components making it up. In most precise description available, a state can only exercise those rights which can not be effectively exercised by intermediary bodies governing various social structures, typically tasks related to foreign policy, defense, money, justice etc.; the state's governing principle is this of subsidiarity or devolution.

According to the Traditionalists a state, and the Spanish state in particular, developed in line with natural law in course of the centuries; it is hence defined by history and tradition. Whenever they refer to a constitution, they usually mean a historical process, not a documented set of agreed principles. The latter is generally deemed not only unnecessary but in fact unacceptable as embodiment of erroneous theories, chiefly this of a national sovereignty and this of a social contract. A state, as a function of society, is considered not a voluntaristic and contractual being which needs to be acknowledged in a formal deal; its principles are defined by traditional Fundamental Laws which are not an agreement, but a result of development occurring in line with natural order. In case of some theorists the above principles were approached somewhat flexibly; few Traditionalists tended to view constitutional document as embodiment of traditional development and contributed to their drafting.

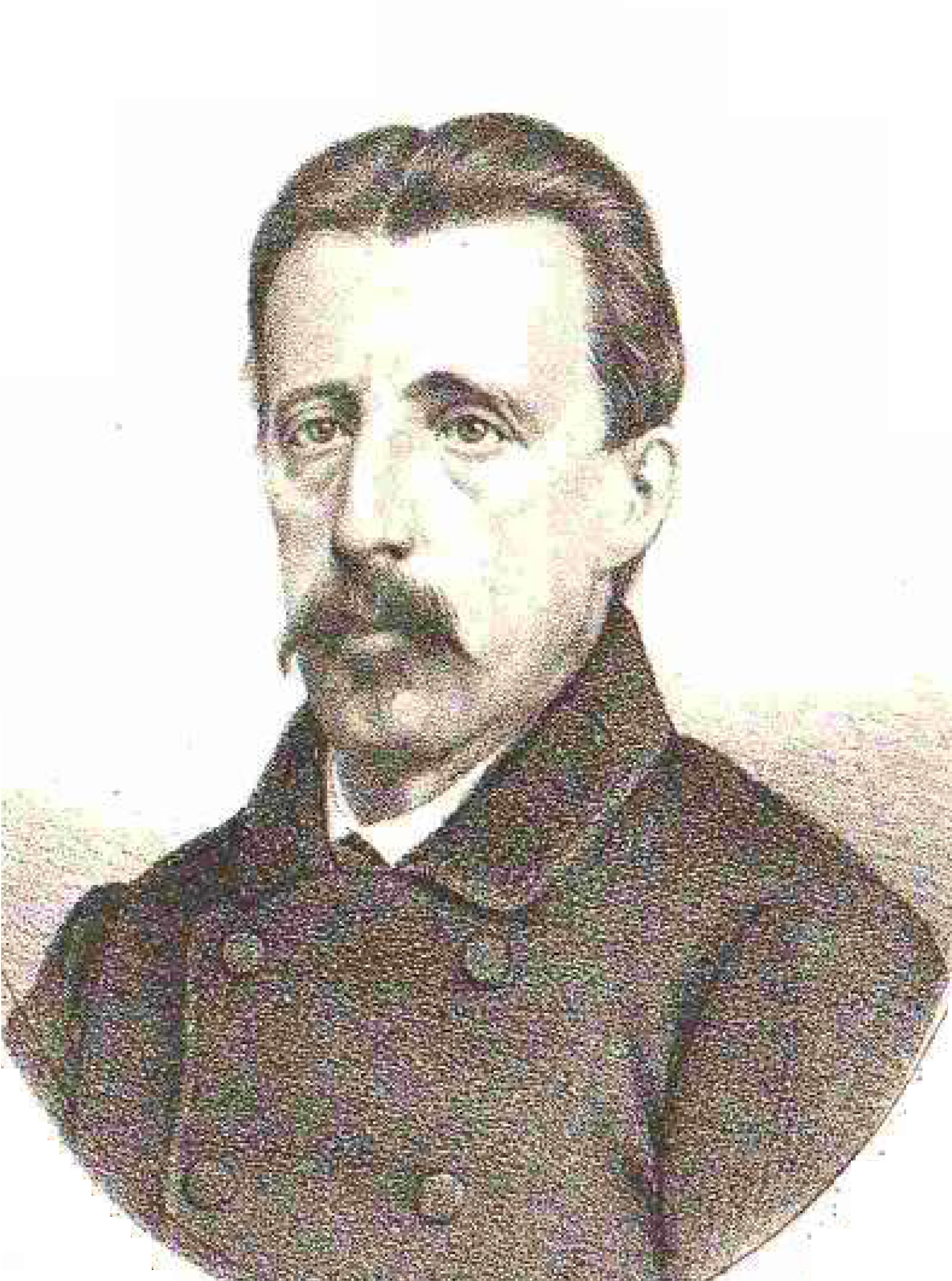
Antonio Juan de Vildósola

In case of Spanish Traditionalists the relationship between a state and Spain has been somewhat vague. Given their emphasis on traditional social components and local identities in particular, Spain was not necessarily identified with a Spanish state. Independent political entities existing on the Iberian Peninsula in the medieval era are deemed part of Spain, which might also be the case of Madrid-controlled territories elsewhere in Europe or Spanish possessions overseas, at times envisioned as a confederation. It is fairly frequent to encounter Traditionalist references to the Spains, "Las Españas", at times divided into "peninsulares" and "ultramarinas", as a principal multi-state point of reference and as a fatherland, though over time they became more and more of a cultural reference, pointing to tradition of Hispanidad. Within this perspective the imperial dimension is ignored or rejected, with focus not on conquest and subordination, but rather on community and shared values. At this point Hispanic cultural tradition is combined with missionary role of the Spanish monarchy, rendering one of the cornerstones of Traditionalist ideario, Patria, rather vague and definitely not tantamount to a state.

=== Society ===
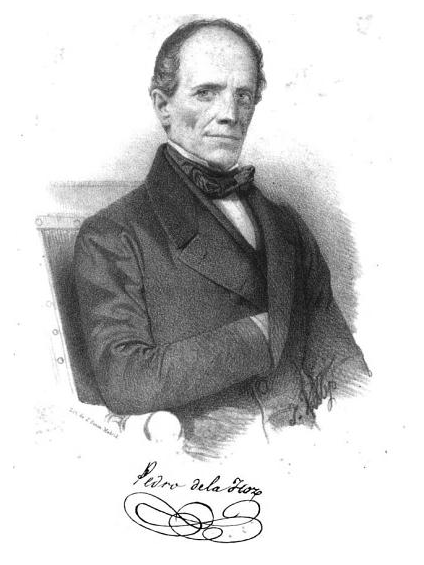
Pedro de la Hoz

Society did not elicit major interest of early Traditionalist theorists, or at least their interest was not formulated in terms of society, formatted rather as a discourse on tradition forming the community; it was in the late 19th century that the question of social fabric emerged on the forefront, which it keeps occupying until today. Its understanding is founded on the concept of organicism: society is formed by a multitude of functional or natural communities – family being the primary and most important component – and is not a set of individuals. These communities are described as joined in a multi-layer structure organized by teleological principles, hierarchic and constantly interfacing with each other. Individuals are first and foremost expressed as members of those communities, not as their own selves, as a man does not exist in isolation. Traditionalists pitted their vision of society principally against the Liberal one, supposed to be based on erroneous principle of individuals and their liberties, exercised in pursuit of their own self; the concept of "human rights" is dismissed.

Another key difference between Traditionalist and non-Traditionalist, especially Liberal visions of society, stemmed from an idea of a social contract, a concept deemed absurd as by default subject to rejection; the Traditionalist society was formed in course of historical development. One more point of contention was that a Traditionalist society was united by common orthodoxy – this is, a Roman Catholic one – while a Liberal society was merely a technical mechanism allowing compromise between many normative moral systems. Finally, the Traditionalist ideal was a hierarchical sociedad estamental, the concept initially pointing to feudal understanding of the estate system, later developed by different authors with varying degree of detail into more complex systems of social groups, dubbed strata, classes, corporations etc.; they were united either by functional role or by their specific interests. This perspective emphasized hierarchy and roles as opposed to emphasizing mobility, when all individuals are equal and can theoretically fit anywhere.

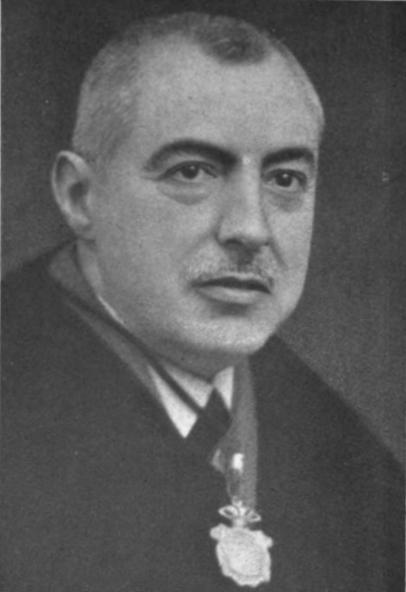
Salvador Minguijon

A theory developed in the late 19th century was that of a social sovereignty. It claimed that communitarian components of the society standing between an individual and a king – named cuerpos intermedios – are fully autonomous and self-governed within their own limits. Neither king nor state nor political administration were entitled to tamper with them and were restrained in their powers by those very autonomous establishments. Effectively, this concept rendered Traditionalist state sort of a federation of geographical entities, professional groupings or functional associations, each of them governing itself as opposed to a society regulated by increasingly homogeneous, universal rules. In the early 19th century this resembled more of a patchy feudal structure pitted against uniformity-driven modernization projects, in the early 21st century it seems rather comparable to devolution, subsidiarity and neo-medievalism in their post-modern incarnation. Social sovereignty should also not be confused with national sovereignty. In Traditionalist thought nation was a marginal concept, deemed originating from revolutionary fallacy and conveying defective theory of legitimacy built from bottom up. If used, the term "nation" stood for community united by common tradition rather than by ethnicity, as people were falling not into various nations but rather into various traditions or, according to some, into various patrias.

=== Representation ===
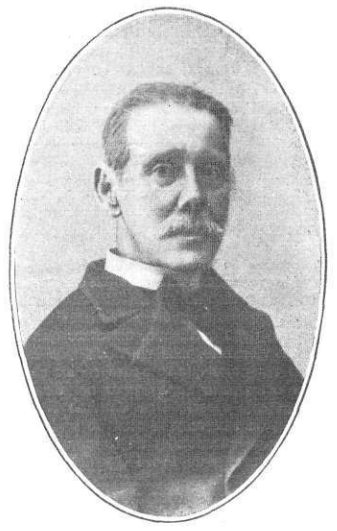
Gabino Tejado

Though according to Traditionalist reading all political sovereignty rests with a king, his powers are limited and he is not considered free to declare his own understanding of these limitations at will; he is supposed to take into account the opinion of cuerpos intermedios. Exact mechanism of this process was described at varying levels of granularity and at times in somewhat contradictory terms; according to some theorists representatives of the society were merely to be consulted, according to some their say should have been formally incorporated into the mechanism of decision making, also to the extent of suspending or blocking royal resolutions; in extreme cases, they were entitled to disobedience or even rejection of an illegitimate ruler. Regardless of the differences, the government was generally deemed responsible to a king rather than to any social representation with monarchy vaguely "moderated" by representatives of the society. Such a vision did not seem necessarily compatible with the theory of unshared royal sovereignty. Traditionalist theories tried to sort out the problem by different workarounds; one of them was that society is not sharing power, but rather is represented in front of the power.

In line with the prevailing Traditionalist reading, representation should be channeled by cuerpos intermedios along what is usually considered a corporative pattern; Traditionalists preferred to name it an organic representation. Differently defined intermediary bodies were free to find their own way of appointing their representatives along differently defined structural patterns. This mechanism was pitted against representation exercised by means of individual popular suffrage, a faulty Liberal concept invented to serve either bourgeoisie or "plebe", exploiting atomization of individuals, unavoidably leading to corruption, partidocracía, oligarchy and caciquismo while failing to represent social interests properly. However, some Traditionalists embraced an idea of non-corporative elections, though usually highly limited by census requirements. The bodies usually named as those gathering representatives of the society were first of all bi-cameral Cortes and then Royal Council.

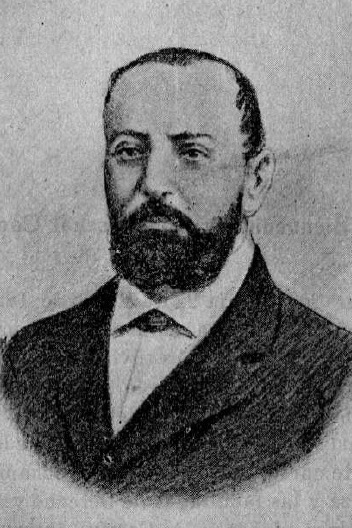
Bienvenido Comín

A somewhat unclear question is this of Traditionalism and democracy. Understood in presently prevailing terms the two are clearly incompatible, as the former identified divine order and the latter the people as a source of public power. Also in terms of praxis most Traditionalists generally rejected democracy as unstable and non-functional system and at the level of popular public discourse Traditionalist press have usually denigrated democracy. However, some key theorists admitted that it might be operational at the lowest community level, e.g. in case of a municipio. Moreover, few – at times dubbed "democrats to the core" – did not reject democracy, understanding it as a principle of representation and legal recognition; according to this reading, popular parliamentary elections were rejected as not genuinely democratic. Similarly vague is Traditionalist approach to dictatorship. In principle fiercely hostile to tyrannical or despotic regimes exercising power beyond appropriate limits, some Traditionalist theorists acknowledged the sovereign right to coerce and agreed – usually as a last resort applicable in extremis – to dictatorial rule. Some have even developed own theories of dictatorship; that of the 1840s was resemblant of a praetorian praxis, while that of the 1920s was far closer to an authoritarian paradigm.

=== Fueros ===
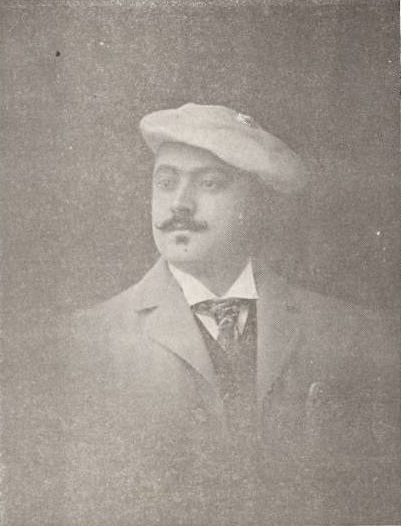
Eustaquio Echave-Sustaeta

Technically speaking territorial entities were just one out of many types of intermediary bodies making up a society; indeed in early Traditionalist writings they did not enjoy particular prominence and according to some scholars they were rather ignored. Traditionalist embracement of separate local legal identities was proportional to modernizing efforts of Liberal governments, which in course of the 19th century systematically did away with feudalism-rooted territory-specific establishments which prevented homogeneity of a modern state. The subject of fueros, traditional regulations specific to some if not most areas, started to feature in the 1840s in the Carlist rather than non-Carlist breed of Traditionalism; by the 1870s it grew to a prominent issue; by the late 19th century re-establishment of the fueros became one of the cornerstones of the entire theory and it remains so until today. The review of Carlist position versus fueros was laid out by Eustaqio Echave-Sustaeta (1912), Teodoro de Arana y Beláustegui (1921), and Justo Garrán Moso (1935).

In the full-blown doctrine fueros are considered primary rules constituting the state and by no means sort of a privilege, granted by central authority to specific territorial entities. Fueros might be applicable to any sort of entity from a municipio to a region, though some theorists focused rather on smaller provinces and some rather on larger regions. According to Traditionalist reading identical set of specific regulations is not applicable across all entities forming a specific category, e.g. across all the provinces; fueros are entity-specific, which means that one province might enjoy some establishments which are not in force in another province. This mechanism reflects a theory that fueros are legal embodiments of local identity which goes far beyond juridical regulations; it is composed of common history, culture and habits.

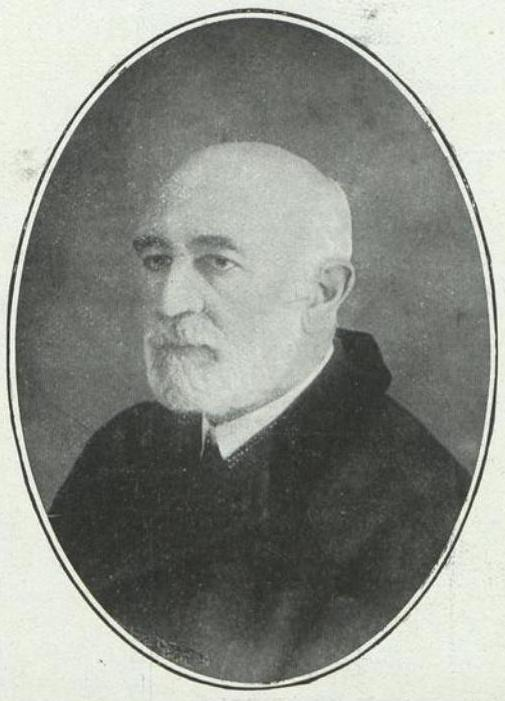
Manuel Polo y Peyrolon

Traditionalism has always struggled to make sure that its understanding of local identity is not confused with not necessarily identical concepts. The closest one is fuerismo, a term at times adopted by the Traditionalists, similarly focused on fueros but made distinct by its limitation to Vascongadas and Navarre, by downplaying the Spanish link and by revindication of pre-1868, but not earlier laws. Similarly close is regionalismo, though Traditionalists were cautious to endorse only regionalismo foralista and to dismiss regionalism based merely on geographic or economic principles. Federalism is also a term accepted by many Traditionalists, as even the key of them auto-defined themselves as federalists, advocated regional federalism and declared Spain a federation of regions; some were longing rather for a confederation. Others, however, were cautious and viewed federative solutions as technocratic, let alone a specific trend within Spanish Liberalism which embraced federative solutions; this is even more so in case of cantonalism, a theory advanced briefly in the mid-19th century by radical Liberal Left. Autonomous solutions were in principle rejected as reflecting the erroneous top-down logic and putting a state before a local entity; some also viewed autonomy of Catalonia or Basque Country as anti-foral because fueros were province-specific. In practice Traditionalists remained highly divided; both in the 1930s and 1970s some supported and some opposed autonomous regulations discussed. The 21st century Traditionalist theorists criticize current praxis of autonomy as increasingly infected with rationalist mentality and positive law. Finally, separatism is mutually viewed as clearly incompatible with Traditionalism; in present-day Spain there is no greater enemy of Traditionalism than independence-minded Basque political movement, and the last Traditionalist known to have been killed was the victim of ETA.

=== Economy ===
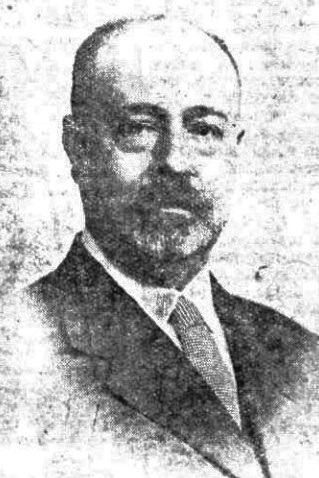
Luis Hernando de Larramendi

As a political doctrine the Spanish Traditionalism did not develop its own economic theory. Explicit references are rare, either very general or very fragmented. Wartime experience of Carlist states briefly emergent during Carlist Wars provide little guidance, be it in general economic terms or in terms of detailed questions like fiscal, monetary or trade policy. Massively changing economic conditions from remnants of late feudalism of the late 18th century to the post-industrial globalization of the early 21st century at various points in time elicited comments applicable to specific conditions, but falling short of a general theory.

There are no traceable specific references to economy in early Traditionalist writings, produced during the twilight of Spanish feudalism. The first incursions into the area came upon implementation of revolutionary roots and gradual emergence of bourgeoisie. Some early Traditionalist theorists voiced in defense of certain features of historical regime, especially huge religious landholdings, subject to massive expropriation project launched by the Liberal governments. In conditions of Spanish agricultural economy these landholdings were normally accessible to rural masses by means of specific and rather affordable agreements. New bourgeoisie owners reformatted usage of the plots on a purely commercial basis; the result was emergence of Traditionalist "sentimientos radicalmente anticapitalistas", directed against the new "agrarismo militante". Similarly unwelcome was the 1834 abolishment of guilds, bodies advocated even 100 years later. Finally, opposition to doing away with feudalism-rooted local customs, fiscal exemptions or other local tariffs, and popular rather than theoretical hostility to urbanization and industrialization by large pitted Traditionalism against the bourgeoisie realm.

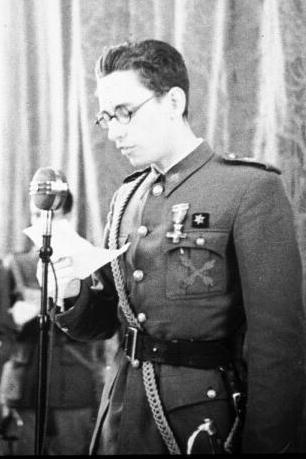
Rafael Gambra

Few non-Carlist Traditionalists accepted desamortización and in line with nascent capitalist order declared individual private property an inviolable foundation of a society; their efforts, typical for the mid-19th century, are summarized as attempts to fuse capitalist impulse with hierarchical structures of predominantly rural society. Gradually private property got fully embraced as a cornerstone of especially the rural economy, with mid-size family holdings in Vascongadas and Navarre presented as an ideal economic milieu. However, it has never marginalized the concept of collective economy, be it in terms of ownership, usage or administration. In rural conditions it resulted in focus on commons like pastures, meadows and forests; in industrial terms it evolved into an attempt to replicate rural family order in the setting of an industrial enterprise, with employers and employees united in a joint management formula. With Rerum novarum accepted as a substitute for own Traditionalist socio-economic recipe, in the first half of the 20th century some pundits have already declared that there was no other possible way of production than capitalism, though they might have also advocated redistribution of wealth as means to solve social problems. During Francoism key Carlist theorists lamented vertical sindicates as pathetic distortion of the gremial system, but it seems that apart from Juanistas, also they accepted "premisas del neocapitalismo", at least in the controlled free-market ambience. Present-day Traditionalist leaders at times admit their "odio al capitalismo" and declare return to the old regime, though its designation remains highly vague; an official party program demonstrates technocratic approach, pointing towards a regulated and common-good oriented free market economy.

=== Foreign relations ===
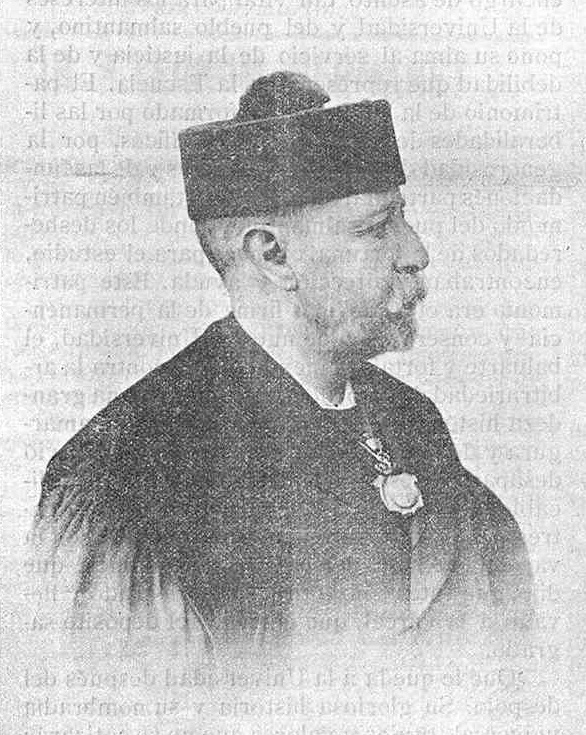
Enrique Gil Robles

Throughout almost 200 years of history the Spanish Traditionalists have sympathised with various countries which at different points in time they considered closest to their own ideological blueprint. In the mid-19th century these were mostly states on the Apennine Peninsula; successive Carlist claimants married women from Borbon and Habsburg branches, ruling in Naples, Modena or Parma. Their suppression of revolutionary risings in 1848–1849 was viewed as triumph over ungodly liberalism; their fall in 1859–1861 was viewed as a fatal blow to European order, the blow completed with abolition of the Papal State – defended e.g. by the later claimant Alfonso Carlos – in 1870. At that time Traditionalists began to focus their hopes on Russia, the country which demonstrated somewhat warm feelings towards the Carlists during both civil wars and which was sympathised with already during the Crimean War. The claimant Carlos VII observed the Balkan campaign against Turkey as tsar's special guest; in the 1890s his son Don Jaime – though he frequented the Austrian military academy – joined the Russian army and he later served in combat missions; at the turn of the centuries Carlist pundits like Enrique Gil-Robles hailed Russia as a bulwark of tradition against the onslaught of plutocracy, secularisation and democracy.

As new lines of the European conflict were getting increasingly clear more and more Carlists began to look to Germany; its dynamic growth to power and its regime were perceived as counter-proposal to rotten, liberalism-driven, decadent French-British alliance. During the First World War most Carlists sympathised with the German Empire, though a sizeable minority section – including the claimant – supported France. The split contributed to major crisis within the movement and its breakup in 1919. In the interwar period Traditionalist press looked with hope towards emerging anti-democratic regimes, especially these of Portugal and Italy, though also in Austria and Germany. Some tentative credit given to Hitler was withdrawn following the Dollfuss assassination, but Mussolini was still viewed as an ally; in the mid-1930s some 200 Carlists received military training in Fascist Italy and the Comunión political leader Rodezno signed a related quasi-political agreement. During the Second World War there were both pro-Axis and pro-Allies currents within the organisation; eventually the non-engagement policy was enforced, even though the regent-claimant was loosely involved in Resistance and he ended up in the Nazi concentration camp.

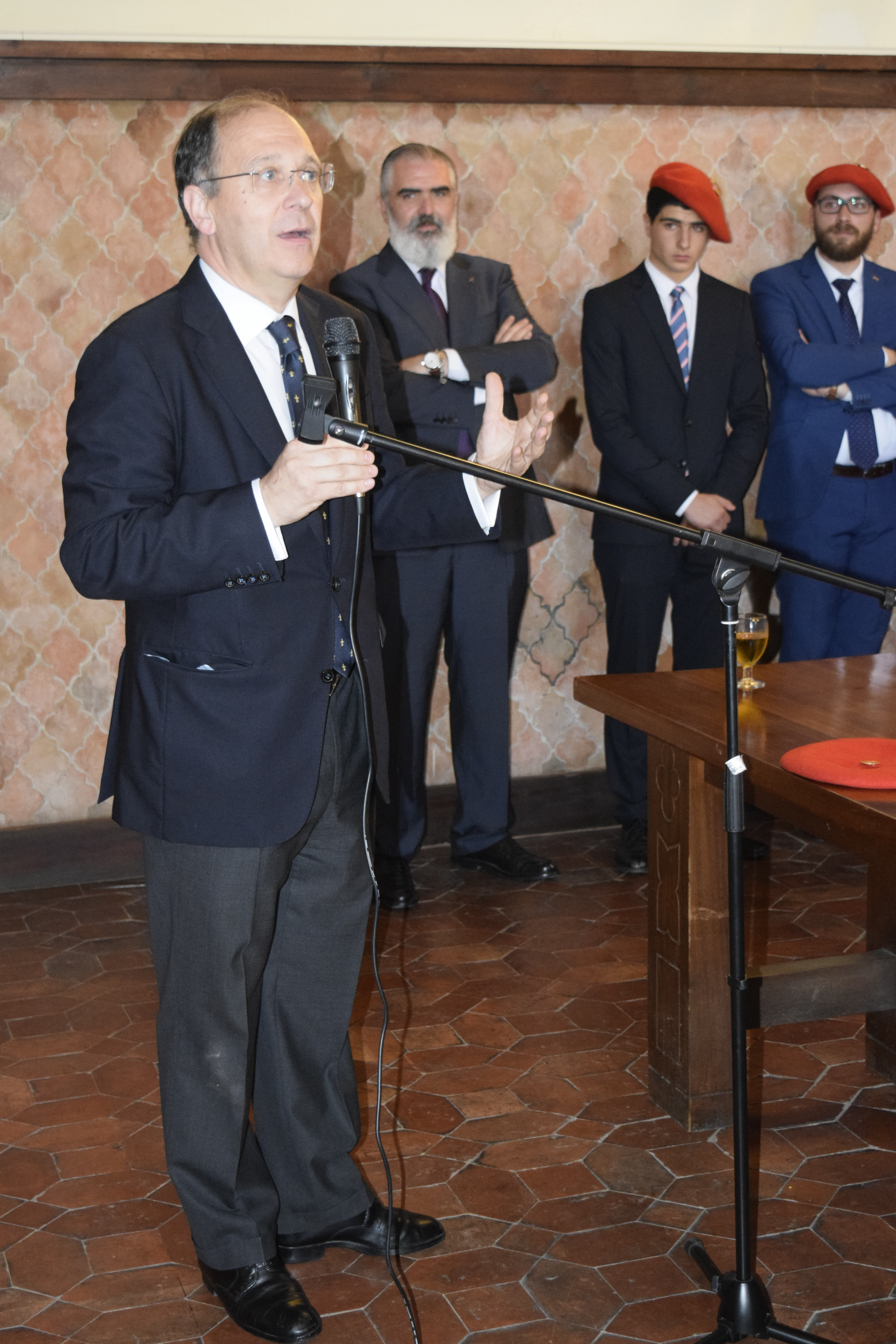
Miguel Ayuso

The Cold War presented the Carlists with a dilemma. As intrinsically anti-revolutionary movement which fought bolshevisation of Spain during the civil war they perceived the Communist block as the arch-enemy. On the other hand, democratic, secular, liberal, left-wing, modern, casual, and initially fiercely anti-Spanish and anti-Portuguese regimes of the Western world were neither seen as a would-be ally, even though marriage of the Carlist infant with a Dutch princess caused more horror and bewilderment in the Netherlands than in Spain. The apparent longing for "a third way", which translated to sympathy for Third World countries, found expression also in fascination with Yugoslavia, nurtured by some currents within Carlism. Following the fall of the bi-polar world the anti-Western sentiment was again on the rise among the Traditionalists. Founded on traditional resentment towards Anglo-Americans and earlier concerns about the emergent consumer society, it was now fuelled also by opposition to cultural revolution marked by LGBT, feminism and woke currents. In the 21st century it converted into fascination with Putin's Russia, presented as a bulwark of traditionalism; pundits like Miguel Ayuso dwell upon Russia "the only Christian global power" and speak against attempts "to strangulate Russia". Upon outbreak of the Russian-Ukrainian war CT and CTC sided with Moscow and their media endorse Russian perspective. Don Sixto has long advocated return to "Russia's historic frontiers".

== Traditionalism and other concepts ==
Spanish Traditionalism is a political theory with over 200 years of history; Traditionalists had to formulate their response to novelties like Declaration of the Rights of Man and of the Citizen of 1789 and the European Constitution of 2004. Traditionalism co-existed with numerous political concepts, maintaining firm position towards some and adopting more erratic course towards the others. Vehement hostility towards theories and political movements deemed revolutionary – especially Liberalism though also Socialism, Communism and Anarchism – remained the backbone of Traditionalist principles. In case of many other doctrines the relationship is not entirely clear, subject to different opinions of competent scholars, confusion in popular discourse or conscious manipulation in partisan political or cultural debate.

=== Absolutism ===
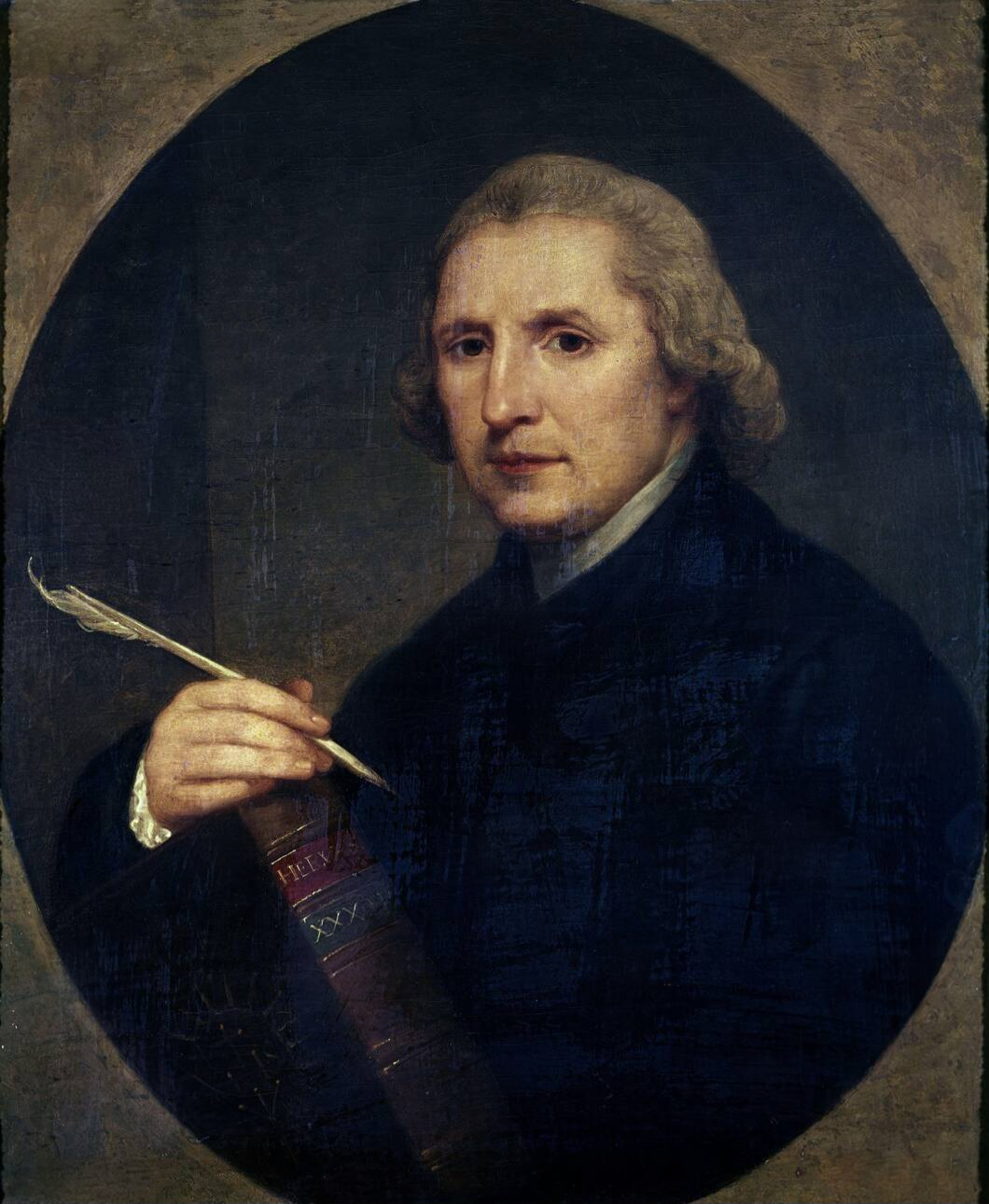
Lorenzo Hervás

There are not infrequent scholarly references to "Carlist absolutism" or "absolutist Traditionalism", usually applied to the early 19th century but at times even to the 1880; in case closer references are provided, they usually point to Manifiesto de los Persas, dubbed "un verdadero alegato absolutista". Indeed, its Article 134 contained a lengthy praise of "monarquía absoluta" and "soberano absoluto"; moreover, in the late 1820s Don Carlos by all means seemed far more vehement defender of antiguo régimen than his brother Fernando VII. However, most scholars dwelling on Traditionalism remain at least cautious when discussing its proximity to Absolutism; the prevailing opinion is that the two offered highly competitive visions. Some relate birth of Traditionalism to mounting dissatisfaction with increasingly absolutist reforms of the 18th century. Some see absolutist references in the Persian Manifesto as linguistic misunderstanding, since the paragraph in question is reportedly clearly aimed against absolute, unlimited monarchical power, standing rather for sovereign execution of undivided powers limited by divine law, justice and fundamental rules of the state. Some note that Absolutism might have served as sort of incubus for Traditionalism, as pre-Traditionalists firmly stood by Fernando VII during his Absolutist-driven purge of afrancesados, revolutionaries and Liberals; however, while both aimed to restore antiguo regimén, the Traditionalists dreamt of coming back to pre-Borbonic regime, not to despotismo ministerial of the late 18th century.

Through much of the 19th century and even late into the 20th century the Traditionalists kept underlining their equidistant stand towards both a Constitutional and an Absolute monarchy. In terms of substance, there were three major issues which stood between the Traditionalists and the Absolutists. First, the former stood by the Spanish political tradition while the latter embraced 18th-century novelties imported from France. Second, the former rejected the principles of Enlightenment as ungodly human usurpation while the latter adopted them as theoretical foundation of absolutismo ilustrado. Third, the former considered the monarch entrusted with execution of powers, limited by natural order, tradition and divine rules, while the latter tended to see him as a source of public power.

=== Carlism ===
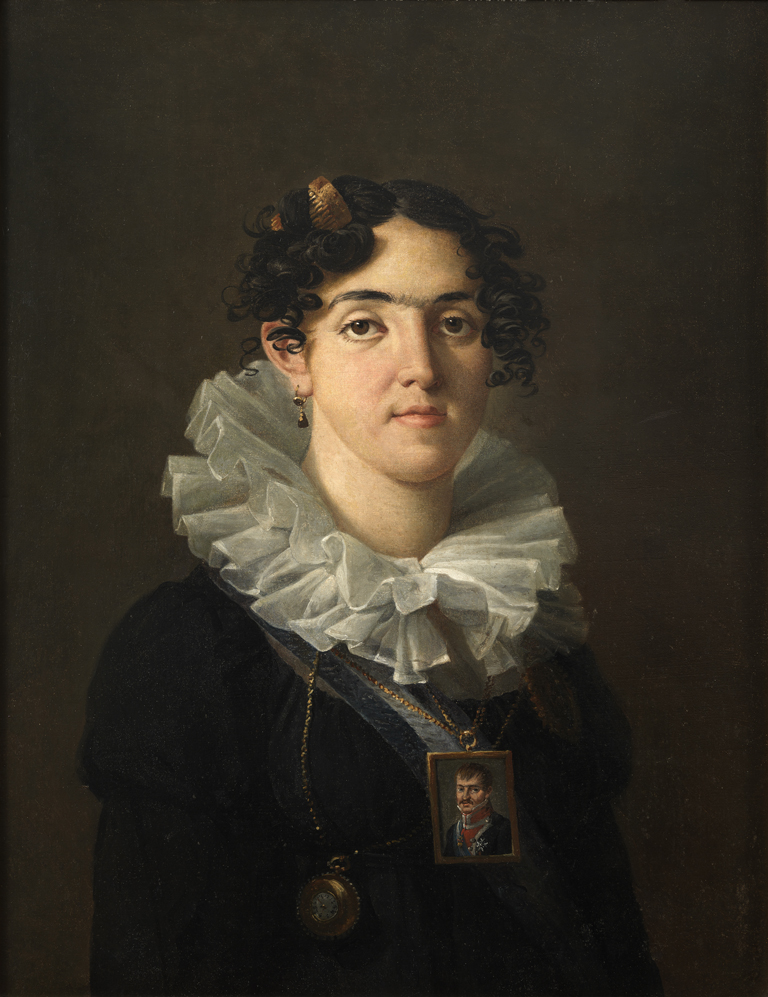
Princess of Beira

There is general and rather unanimous understanding both in historiography and in political sciences that Traditionalism is heavily related to Carlism, though exact relationship between the two might be understood in widely different terms. The prevailing theory holds that Traditionalism is a theoretical political doctrine, which has been adopted by social and political movement named Carlism. The version of this theory currently accepted by the Carlists themselves is that though not exclusively forming their outlook, Traditionalism combined with a theory of dynastic legitimacy and a theory of Spanish historical continuity is one of 3 theoretical pillars of Carlism. In some concise definitions Traditionalism is simply presented as a doctrine of the Carlists. However, in detailed scholarly discourse most students are cautious to underline that Traditionalism appears in Carlist and non-Carlist incarnations. Some of them maintain that Carlism is the essence of Traditionalism, its proper case, in Aristotelian terms πρός έν or rather έφ ένός of Traditionalism. Others present the opposite opinion, leaving no stone unturned in search for arguments that mainstream Traditionalism was not Carlist; finally, there are many authors in-between both positions. Most students – especially historians – do not go into such detail; they note that Carlists nurtured "their brand of Traditionalism" and either mention "Carlist Traditionalism" or use both terms almost interchangeably. Finally, there are scholars who claim that in principle Carlism and Traditionalism had little in common and one can either be a genuine Carlist or a Traditionalist; this is a theory pursued mostly by students related to Partido Carlista, who present Carlism as a movement of social protest at times infiltrated by Traditionalists.

Apart from differing scholarly opinions on Traditionalism v. Carlism there is also confusion related to terminology and historical usage in popular discourse. It stems mostly from secessions which occurred within political movement and exclusive claims which various factions laid to Traditionalist credentials, though also from conscious attempts to manipulate public opinion. The former is related to 1888 and 1919 secessions from mainstream Carlism; both Nocedalista and Mellista breakaways were and are at times dubbed Traditionalists and pitted against Carlists, especially that the party of de Mella assumed the name of Partido Católico Tradicionalista and both Nocedalistas and Mellistas claimed exclusive license for usage of the term. Manipulation is the case of Primo de Rivera and Franco dictatorships; with intention to deny existence of political groupings other than the official party, both regimes downplayed the term "Carlism" and used to replace it with "Traditionalism"; the latter was deemed more ample, capable of covering also principles of the respective regimes, and in particular deprived of the potentially harmful dynastic ingredient.

=== Conservatism ===
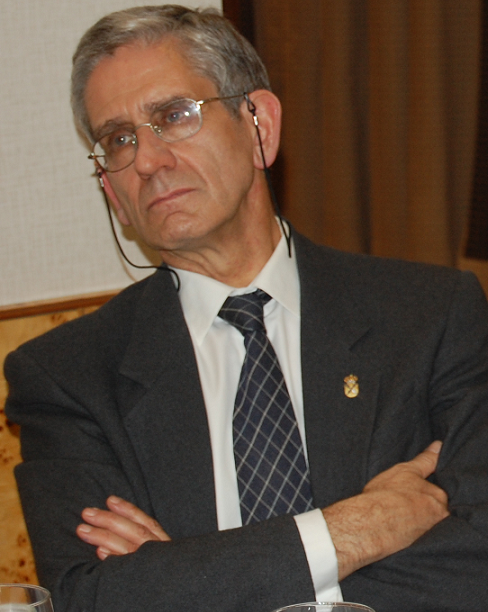
José Miguel Gambra Gutiérrez

In terms of real-life politics the Spanish Conservatives from the onset remained largely at odds with the Traditionalists. Doceañistas of the Fernandine period, Partido Moderado of the Isabelline era and Partido Conservador of the Restoration stayed fiercely hostile to Carlist Traditionalism, though there were periods of rapprochement with non-legitimist branches of the movement; some representatives of the two neared each other in times of Donoso Cortés, neocatólicos, Alejandro Pidal and Menéndez Pelayo, with offshoot Conservative branches like Mauristas considering even a fusion with Traditionalists. In terms of doctrinal affinity mutual relationship of the two is more ambiguous and difficult to capture.

Traditionalism is not infrequently referred to as Conservative or even Ultra-conservative theory. Recent multi-dimensional typological attempt presents an ambiguous picture. Some detailed scholarly studies claim that Traditionalism and Conservatism are clearly distinct concepts, be it in case of Spain or in general. The former is based on religious principles and sourced in the Revelation, the latter – though usually respectful towards religious values – is not centered around them. The former understands politics as means of achieving missionary Catholic objectives, the latter as a technique of exercising public power. The former is founded on unalterable nucleus, the latter is in principle evolutionary. The former is providential, the latter is deterministic and historicist. The former is incompatible with democracy, the latter is perfectly tailored to operate in a realm founded on sovereignty of the peoples assumption. The former is monarchist, the latter is accidentalist. The former is derived from vernacular cultural tradition, the latter is in principle universal. The former perceives society as based on presumed natural order, the latter as stemming from contractual and voluntaristic principles embodied in a constitution. The former understands society as composed of organic bodies, the latter as composed of free individuals. The former sees public power as united and integral, the latter as divided into legislative, executive and judicial branches. Perhaps a good though obviously simplistic way of summarizing the difference between the two is noting that while the Conservatives usually have no problem admitting their Right-wing identity, the Traditionalists are uneasy about it, pointing that their concept is rooted in pre-1789 realm, before the Right-Left paradigm had been even born.

=== Fascism ===
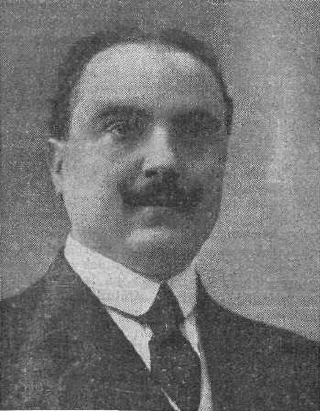
José M. Albiñana

In anonymous cyberspace Traditionalism as component of the Nationalist faction during the Spanish Civil War might be referred to in catch-all terms as Fascism; also some politicians at times use the term "fascist" as abuse and insult, applied to the Traditionalists. In scholarly discourse such perspective is extremely rare, though not nonexistent. Some scholars in case of selected authors suggested a fusion of two doctrines, referring to "traditionalist Fascism" and dub selected Traditionalist authors "Fascists" or even "super-Fascists". At times episodes of rapprochement between Traditionalists and Fascists or Nazis are discussed, like institutional attempt to blend Traditionalism and Fascism into Partido Nacionalista Español of José Albiñana, generally positive treatment Mussolini and initially Hitler enjoyed in the Traditionalist press, training received by Carlist paramilitary in Italy in the mid-1930s, or a spate of congratulation telegrams from Carlist politicians to Nazi embassy in Madrid following outbreak of the 1941 German-Soviet war. However, no broader conclusions are drawn, perhaps except that both systems shared vehement hostility towards parties, democracy, freemasonry, class war and Communism.

Detailed studies highlight differences between the two doctrines and suggest they were largely on a collision course. Any cautious sympathy that Traditionalist authors might have nurtured towards Hitler evaporated following assassination of Dollfuss, and all differences in terms of outlook started to stand out. What estranged the Traditionalists was in particular: foreign origins of Fascism, considered incompatible with Spanish tradition; the Fascist statolatria, with omnipotent state controlling more and more areas of public life; marginalization of religion, especially openly pagan and anti-Christian profile of the Nazis; drive for social engineering; Fascist focus on industry and heavy industry, incompatible with rural Traditionalist outlook; nationalism, with nation and ethnicity elevated to status of secular god; racism, usually eliciting furious response of Traditionalists who used to associate it with separatist Basque ideology; leadership principle, considered close to blasphemous faith in false idols; centralism and homogenization, wiping out local identities and separate establishments; general modernizing crusade, including the horror of young women with bare shoulders and legs paraded in mass on sport stadiums.

=== Francoism ===
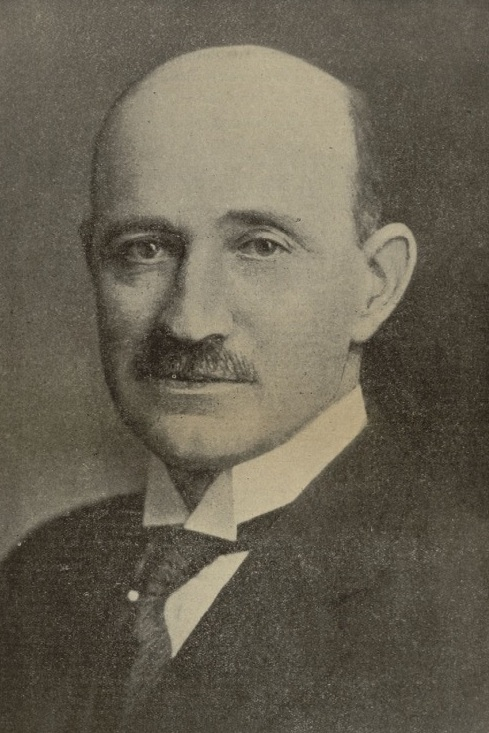
Víctor Pradera

At a first glance the name of the Francoist state party – Falange Española Tradicionalista – might suggest that Traditionalism was firmly mounted within the Francoist theory of politics. Indeed, there is almost unanimous agreement that Traditionalism has heavily contributed to the Francoist political doctrine – this is, provided scholars agree there was such. Some conclude that once the regime emerged from its national-syndicalist phase of the early 1940s, it was perhaps closer to Traditionalist blueprint than to any other theoretical political concept. Others limit the case to the 1944–1957 period only, after de-emphasizing of falangism and before embarking on a technocratic course. Former Acción Española theorists are credited for infusing Traditionalist spirit, based on its pre-war nacionalcatolicismo version, into the country institutional shape, and for the 1958-adopted auto-definition of Francoist Spain as Monarquía Tradícional, Católica, Social y Representativa. Key common features, apart from negative points of reference like democracy, plutocracy, Socialism, Communism, Liberalism, parliamentarism, freemasonry and so-called European values, would be: organic vision of society, culture subjected to Catholic church, corporative political representation and focus on Hispanic tradition.

Scholars discussing history and doctrine of Traditionalism during the Francoist era underline its paradoxical, incoherent, contradictory, fragmented and erratic stand towards the regime. Thinkers related to Carlism kept claiming that the system built by Franco was entirely incompatible with Traditionalism, pitting nationalism against non-ethnic patriotism, centralism against regionalism, homogenization against diversity, hybrid caudillaje against monarchy, omnipotent state and its dirigisme against withdrawn minimalist structure, monstrous single party against doing away with all parties, Cortes based on personal appointments against Cortes based on genuine organic representation, syndicalism against gremialism and Church subservient to state against state subservient to Church, plus charges related to changes of late Francoism, especially those related to technocratic spirit and religious liberty. The result was that politically, Traditionalists failed to square the circle of forging a coherent stand versus the Franco regime; their position ranged from violence and conspiracy to non-participation, intra-system opposition, conditional co-operation, endorsement and finally amalgamation into a carlo-francoist blend.

=== Nationalism ===
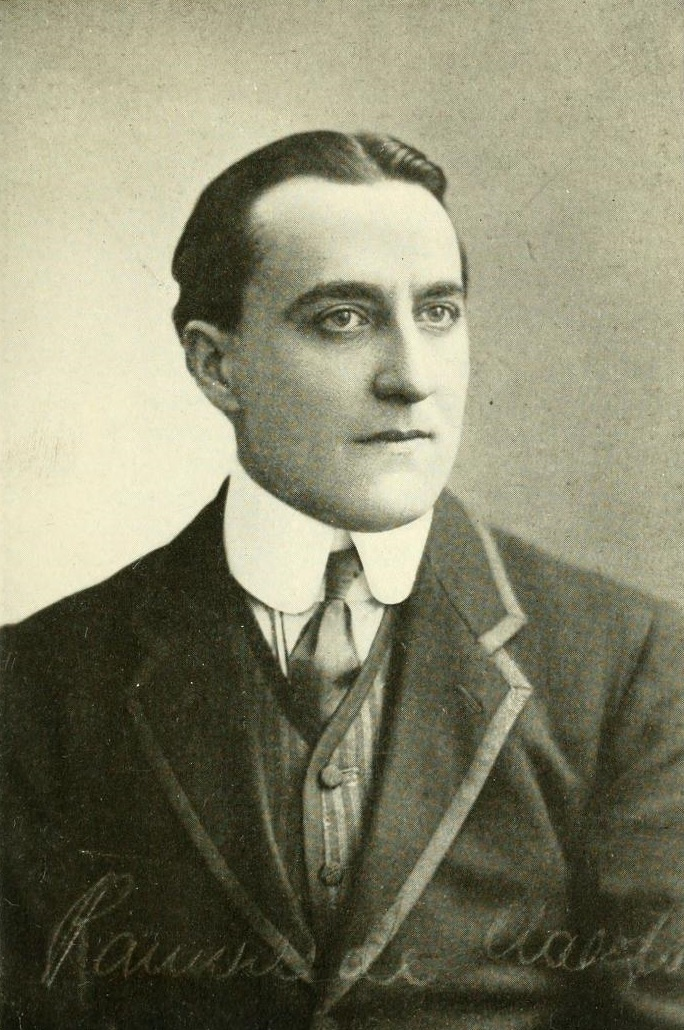
Ramiro de Maeztu

There are scholars who claim that initially clearly anti-Nationalist, in the 1870s the Carlist breed of Traditionalism started to approach Nationalism. Some Traditionalist authors at times defined themselves as "españolistas"; some of them, especially Pradera, are fairly frequently considered champions of españolismo; finally, the spirit of nacionalcatolicismo, both in its pre-war Acción Española and post-war Francoist incarnations, is at times defined as Traditionalism enveloped in Integral Nationalism. Some scholars relate Traditionalism not to the Spanish, but to the Basque Nationalism. The prevailing opinion, however, is that Traditionalism has always been on collision course with Nationalism, be it in 1801 or in 2001. Early Nationalism stemmed from the French Revolution supported by its ideological toolset, with sovereignty of the peoples at the forefront, and as such it represented an all-out challenge to Traditionalist understanding of public power. Throughout most of the 19th century the European Nationalisms – German, Italian, Polish – elicited no support of the Traditionalists, who related them to Liberalism, Carbonarism or various breeds of Republicanism and cheered their defeats at hands of the Holy Alliance.

By the end of the century the emergence of Basque and Catalan movements helped to formulate Traditionalist response to modern Nationalism, the response formatted in cultural terms of Hispanidad rather than in Nationalist terms of españolismo. As it seems that Traditionalism might have served as incubus for Catalan and Basque Nationalisms, and in the early 20th century a number of individuals left Traditionalism to become activists of peripheral Nationalisms, they were viewed as traitors in Traditionalism camp, receiving particularly venomous and hostile welcome. Emergence of Maurras-inspired integral Nationalism of the 1920s made some impact on Traditionalism, but lack of transcendent component and rationalizing logic prevented major understanding. Traditionalists from the Acción Española school, who neared nacionalcatolicismo of the early 1940s, were not immune to temptations of Nationalism also in its non-Integralist, ethnicity-based branch. Those related to Carlism stayed firmly within borders of Hispanidad, lamenting Francoist crackdown on Basque and Catalan culture though also firmly opposing political ambitions of the Basques and the Catalans. Nation states, dominating in Europe of the 20th century, were deemed incompatible with Traditionalism.

=== Other ===
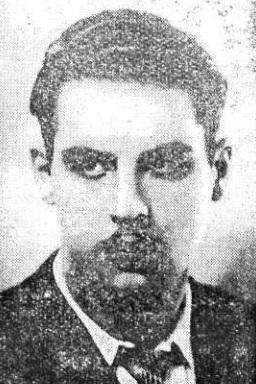
Jaime del Burgo Torres

Over time Traditionalism has partially overlapped with or was otherwise related to a number of other concepts, some of them political doctrines, some merely theoretical trends, some types of political praxis and some denoting social or cultural phenomena. They could be related to: general political setting – contrarrevolucionarios, reaccionarios, derechistas; religious issues – apostólicos, neocatólicos, ultramontanismo, lefebrismo, integrismo, clericalismo, nacionalcatolicisimo, democristianos; territorial organisation – federalismo, regionalismo, foralismo, fuerismo, cuarentaiunistas, antitrentainuevistas, autonomismo, navarrismo, vasquismo, catalanismo; way of life and production: provincionalismo, agrarismo, ruralismo; foreign policy – imperialismo, iberismo, germanofilia, anglofobia, antieuropeanismo; monarchy – legitimismo, realismo, blancs d'Espagne, miguelismo; organisation of society – comunitarismo, authoritarismo, organicismo, corporativismo, socialcatolicismo, sociedalismo, neotradicionalismo; short-lived social or political strategies or phenomena: doceañistas, malcontents, oyalateros, trabucaires, montemolinismo, matiners, transaccionismo, immovilismo, aperturismo, minimismo, bunkerismo, socialismo autogestionario; personal following at times amounting to a political option: pidalistas, menendezpelayistas, mellistas, nocedalistas, jaimistas, cruzadistas, falcondistas, sivattistas, carloctavistas, juanistas, rodeznistas, estorilos, javieristas, hugocarlistas, juancarlistas, sixtinos, javierocarlistas, tronovacantistas. Though none of these terms is crucial for understanding the history or contents of Traditionalism, they set its conceptual background and might serve as occasional points of reference.

== List of selected traditionalist texts ==
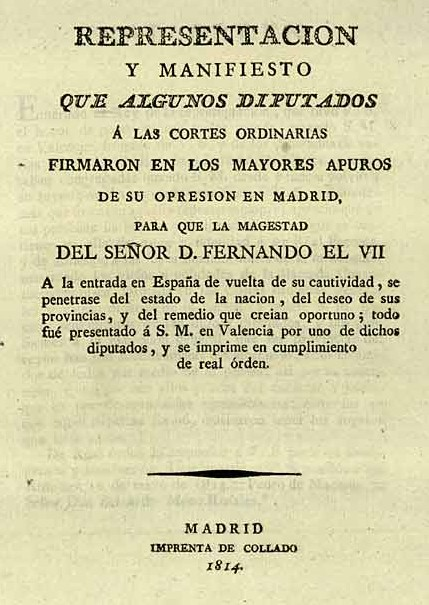

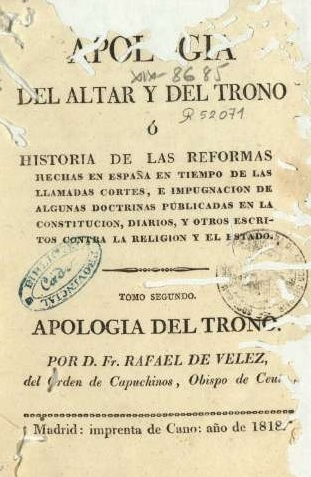

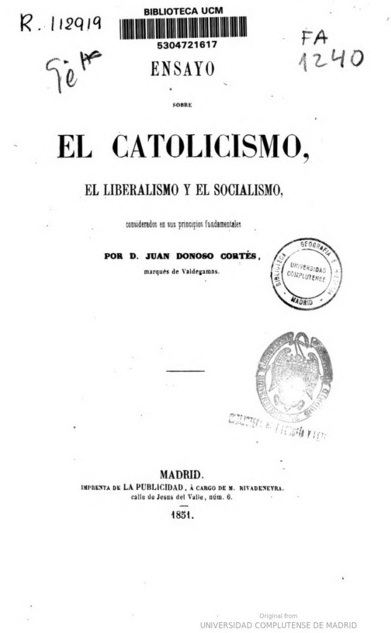

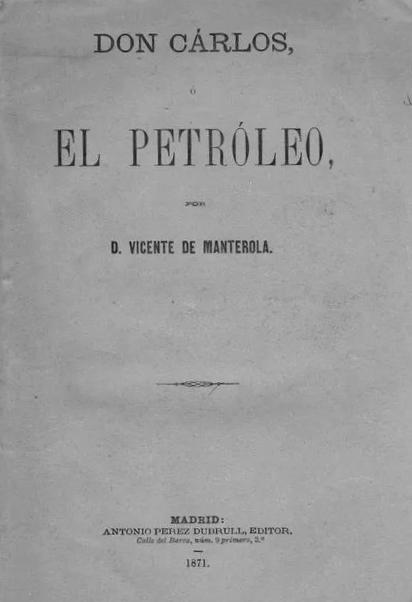

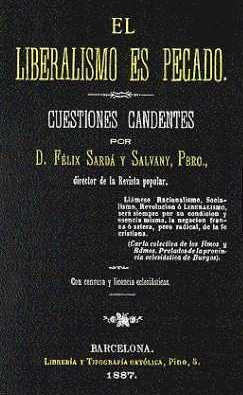

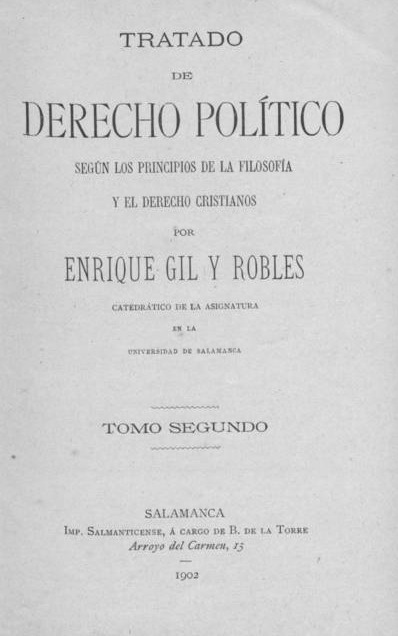

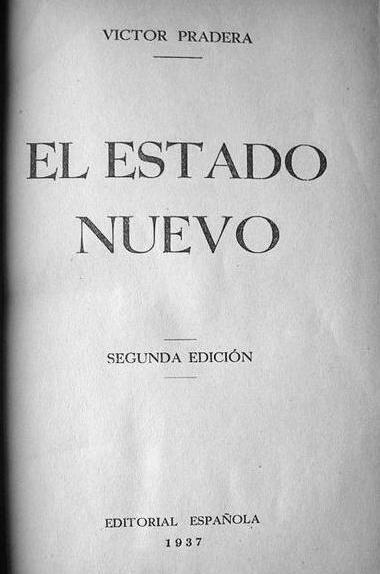

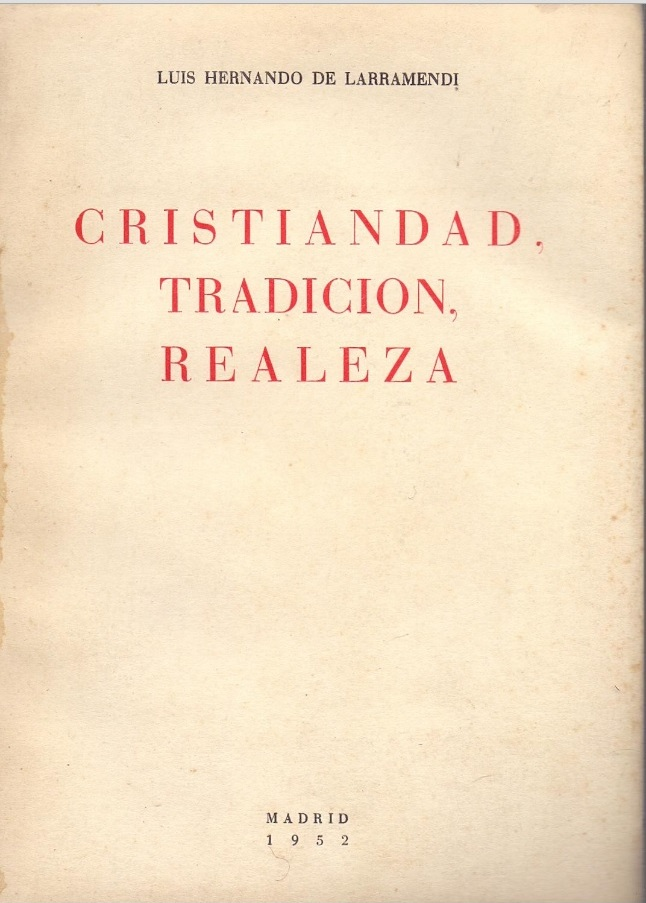

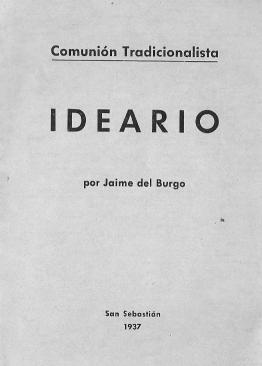

60 selected Traditionalist texts
year	title	author
1814	Manifiesto de los Persas	Bernardo Mozo de Rosales
1818	Apologia del altar y del trono	Rafael de Veléz
1822	Manifiesto del barón de Eroles a los Catalanes	Joaquín Ibáñez-Cuevas y Valonga
1833	Manifiesto de Castello Branco	Carlos María Isidro de Borbón
1842	La España en la presente crisis	Vicente Pou
1843	Las leyes fundamentales de la monarquía española	Magín Ferrer y Pons
1845	Manifiesto del Conde de Montemolín a los españoles	Jaime Balmes
1851	Ensayo sobre el catolicismo, el liberalismo y el socialismo	Juan Donoso Cortés
1864	Carta de Maria Teresa de Borbón y Braganza	Pedro de la Hoz
1868	La solución española en el rey y en la ley	Antonio Juan de Vildósola
1869	Carta de Don Carlos a su hermano Don Alfonso	Antonio Aparisi y Guijarro
1869	El Rey de España	Antonio Aparisi y Guijarro
1869	La solución lógica en la presente crisis	Gabino Tejado
1870	La política tradicional de España	Bienvenido Comín y Sarté
1871	Don Carlos o el petróleo	Vicente Manterola
1874	Manifiesto de Deva	Carlos de Borbón
1880	Historia de los heterodoxos españoles	Marcelino Menéndez Pelayo
1880	¿Qué esperáis?	Alejandro Pidal
1887	El liberalismo es pecado	Félix Sardá y Salvany
1888	El pensamiento del Duque de Madrid	Luis María de Llauder
1888	Manifestación de Burgos	Ramón Nocedal
1897	Acta de Loredán	joint work
1899	Tratado de derecho político	Enrique Gil Robles
1905	Credo y programa del Partido Carlista	Manuel Polo y Peyrolón
1910	Las Cortes de Cádiz	Juan María Roma
1912	¿Cuál es el mal mayor y cuál el mal menor?	José Roca y Ponsa
1914	La crisis del tradicionalismo en España	Salvador Minguijón
1919	Acuerdo de la Junta Magna de Biarritz	joint work
1921	La autonomia de la sociedad y el poder del estado	Juan Vazquez de Mella
1930	Doctrinas y anhelos de la Comunión tradicionalista	joint work
1932	Verdadera doctrina sobre acatamiento	Manuel Senante Martinez
1934	Defensa de la Hispanidad	Ramiro de Maeztu
1934	Manifiesto de Viena	Alfonso Carlos de Borbón
1935	El Estado Nuevo	Víctor Pradera
1937	Ideario	Jaime del Burgo
1937	Corporativismo gremial	José María Araúz de Robles
1938	El sistema tradicional	Luis Hernando de Larramendi
1938	El tradicionalismo político español y la ciencia hispana	Marcial Solana González-Camino
1939	Manifestación de los ideales tradicionalistas	joint work
1949	¿Quién es el Rey?	Fernando Polo
1949	España, sin problema	Rafael Calvo Serer
1952	El poder entrañable	Vicente Marrero
1954	La monarquía tradicional	Francisco Elías de Tejada
1954	La monarquía social y representativa en el pensamiento tradicional	Rafael Gambra Ciudad
1960	Instituciones de la Monarquía Española	Jaime de Carlos Gómez-Rodulfo
1961	Tradición y monarquía	José María Codón Fernández
1961	Meditaciones sobre el Tradicionalismo	José María Pemán
1963	El Carlismo y la Unidad Católica	joint work
1965	Consideraciones sobre la democracía	Eugenio Vegas Latapié
1969	Fundamento y soluciones de la organización por cuerpos intermedios	Juan Vallet de Goytisolo
1971	¿Qué es el carlismo?	joint work
1977	Política española. Pasado y futuro	Francisco Canals Vidal
1977	Así pensamos	Frederick Wilhelmsen
1986	Los errores del cambio	Gonzalo Fernández de la Mora
1996	Panorama para una reforma del estado	Ignacio Hernando de Larramendi
2002	La actualidad del „Dios-Patria-Rey”	Álvaro d'Ors
2008	La constitución cristiana de los estados	Miguel Ayuso
2011	El estado en su laberinto	Miguel Ayuso
2016	Programa político	joint work
2019	La sociedad tradicional y sus enemigos	José Miguel Gambra Gutiérrez

== See also ==
- Carlism
- Traditionalism (Catholicism)
- Integrism (Spain)
- Carlism in literature
