= Trad =

Trad is often an abbreviation of the word "traditional".

Trad(s) may also refer to:

== Music ==
- Irish trad, a genre of folk music that developed in Ireland
- Néo-trad, a musical style that arose in Quebec around the turn of the 21st century
- Trad jazz, a style of jazz music in the 1950s and 1960s

== Places ==
- Trat Province, Thailand, also spelt Trad
  - Trat, a town in Thailand

== Science and technology ==
- Trad, abbreviation of teraradian, a unit of angle
- Trad, abbreviation of terarad, a unit of radiation dose
- Tradescantia or Spiderwort, a genus of plant species in the family Commelinaceae, sometimes called trad

== Other uses ==
- Ivy League clothes, a style of men's dress, popular during the late 1950s
- Trad (film), a 2025 Irish comedy music film
- Trad climbing, a type of free climbing in rock climbing
- Trads (Hindutva), a loose group of alt-right activists and internet trolls within the Hindutva movement
- Trojan skinhead, subculture also known as traditional or trad skinheads
