= Alberto Ruiz de Galarreta Mocoroa =

Spanish historian

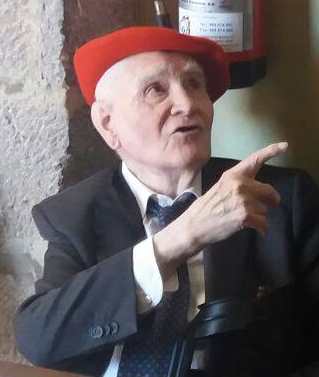
- Born: 1922; San Sebastián, Spain
- Died: 2019 (aged 96–97); Valencia, Spain
- Occupation: military
- Known for: historian
- Political party: Carlism

Alberto Ruiz de Galarreta Mocoroa (1922 – 2019) was a Spanish historian. He is known mostly as the author of massive, 29-volume series titled Apuntes y documentos para la historia del tradicionalismo español. Written under the pen-name of "Manuel de Santa Cruz", it covers the history of Carlism between 1939 and 1966 and is considered a fundamental work of reference for any student of the movement in the Francoist era. Galarreta is also moderately recognized as a periodista, who contributed to numerous right-wing periodicals; for almost 40 years he was the moving spirit behind a Navarrese weekly/bi-weekly Siempre P'alante. He advanced the Traditionalist outlook highly saturated with Integrism; in particular, he was a vehement advocate of the religious unity of Spain. Politically he maintained a low profile, though he participated in Carlist cultural pursuits and a few times he wrote documents issued by the Carlist executive.

== Family and youth ==
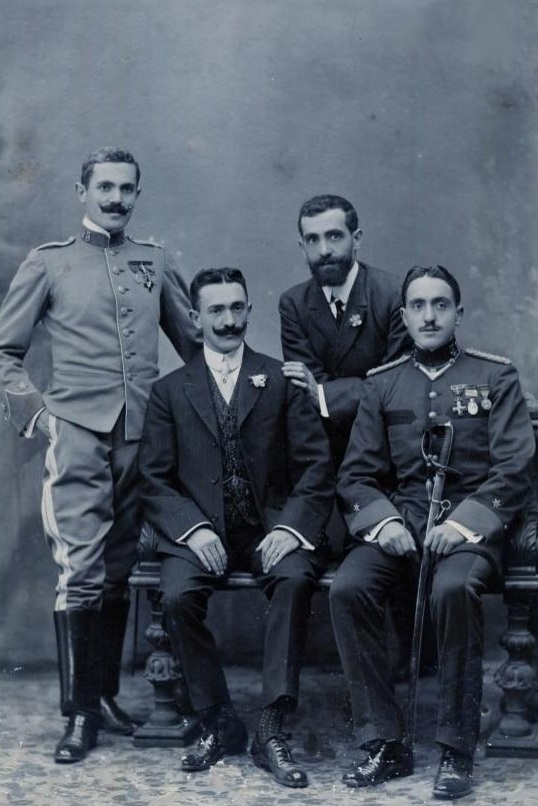
father (2fL) and uncles

The Ruiz de Galarreta family originated from Álava; throughout the centuries it branched out, especially across Vascongadas and Navarre. One branch settled in the Navarrese hamlet of Zudaire in Sierra de Urbasa; they got their hidalguia confirmed in the late 16th century and re-confirmed a number of times later. Its descendants moved to nearby Estella and grew to include distinguished citizens; one was the alcalde of the city. The oldest identified strictly paternal ancestor of Alberto was born in the mid-18th century. His great-grandson and the grandfather of Alberto, Felipe Ruiz de Galarreta Dombrasas (died 1926) was also born in Estella, but some time in the 1870s he moved to Pamplona, where in 1875 he married Pilar Maestu (in some spellings Maeztu) Navarro. It is not clear what he was doing for a living, yet he was a prominent figure, since his death was mentioned even in Madrid newspapers.

Felipe and Pilar had at least six children, born between the late 1870s and the late 1880s. One daughter became a religious, two sons entered the military and the other three commenced the career of entrepreneurs. One of them was Alberto's father, Teodoro Ruiz de Galarreta Maestu (1884–1954). He entered into commerce and traded in grain and seeds; at Camino de la Estación in Pamplona he operated a large warehouse and travelled on business to Guatemala or Argentina. In some present-day works he is referred to as "gran empresario". However, he is remembered rather due to his passion for stereoscopic photography; some 600 of his excellent quality photographs form part of the Navarrese cultural heritage. In 1921 he married María Felisa Mocoroa Durán, a girl from San Sebastián; she was daughter to a Donostian comerciante trading in seeds, Juan Mocoroa.

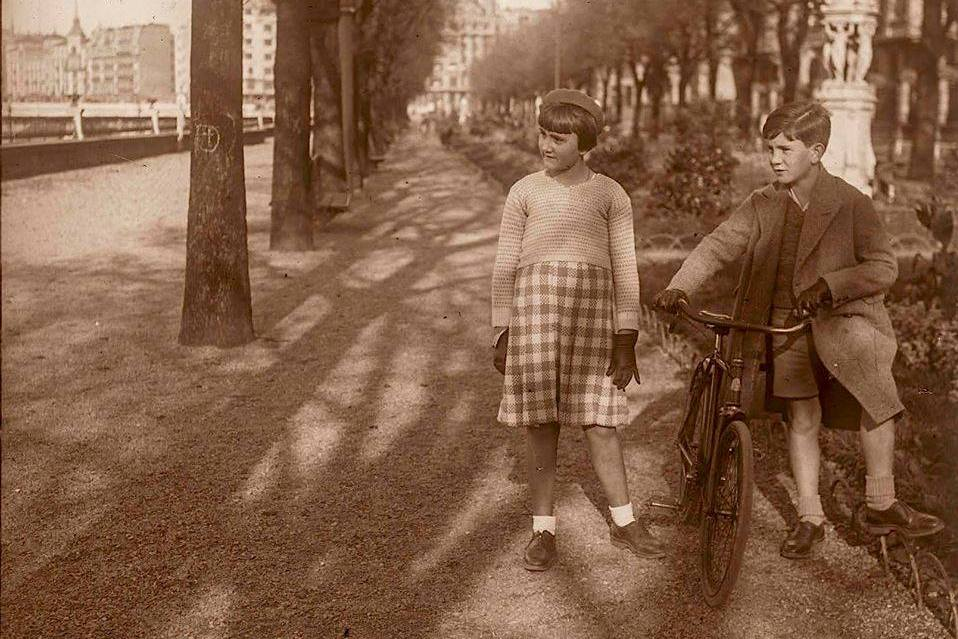
with sister in Donostia, 1932

Teodoro and María Felisa had two children, Alberto and his younger sister Elvira. They spent their childhood in San Sebastián; none of the sources consulted provided information on his early schooling and fate during the civil war, though one notes that he “vividly remembered those years of terror and heroism”. He intended to commence a religious career and entered a Jesuit novitiate in the Veruela Abbey; however, his superiors found he did not have the vocation needed. The young Ruiz de Galarreta in 1939 opted for medicine, studied in Valencia and graduated with a thesis on the history of medicine, which he applied to Navy medical services later. He did not marry and had no children. His best-known relative is his nephew, a Valencian business tycoon named Alberto Catalá Ruiz de Galarreta. His cousin Ignacio Ruiz de Galarreta Maisonnave was dean of the Pamplona Colegio de Abogados in the 1970s; his wife María Isabel Hualde Redín wrote lyrics to Riau-Riau. Their son José Ignacio Ruiz de Galarreta Hualde was a Jesuit theologian and author of numerous popular books revolving around religious topics. Salvador Gayarre Ruiz de Galarreta, an architect, was grandson to Alberto's paternal uncle.

== Navy career ==
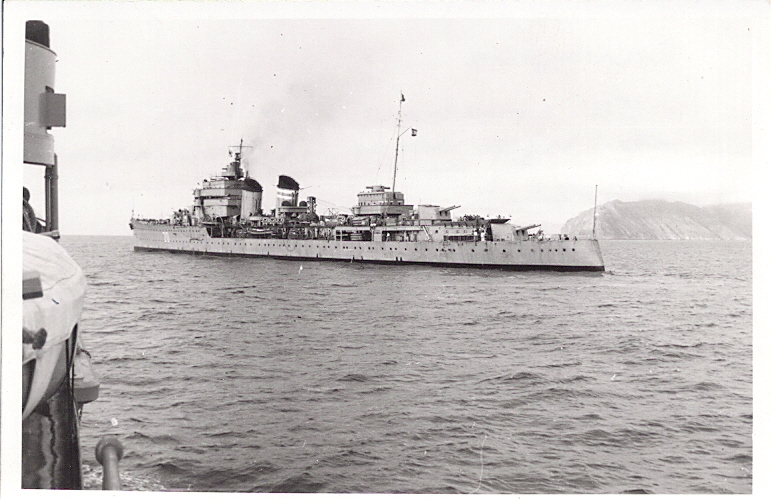
Miguel de Cervantes

In 1949 Galarreta was admitted to entry exams to the Cuerpo de Sanidád de la Armada, the medical branch of the Spanish Navy. It is not clear whether he passed the exams that year or shortly afterwards; however, at the turn of the decade he served in the Hospital de Marina in Cartagena. In 1951 he was released from the hospital and posted to a minelayer named Vulcano, though official sources provide confusing evidence as to his rank; the ones from April 1951 and January 1952 list him as teniente médico, while the one from April 1952 as alférez de navío. His service on the sea continued, when in 1952 he was moved to the Segunda Flotilla de Destructores at an unclear location. In 1954 Galarreta was promoted from lieutenant medic to Capitan Médico de la Armada and commenced service on the light cruiser Miguel de Cervantes, one of the most powerful ships of the Spanish navy of the early Francoist era. However, in 1956 he was posted to a tugboat flotilla; at the time he was listed as alumno attending the surgeon classes, most likely at the University of Valencia. It is not known if and when he completed the curriculum; in 1956 the Junta de la Facultad de Medicina granted his request to proceed with a doctoral dissertation at the Universidad de Madrid, yet there is no information on his PhD laurels. Galarreta's navy postings in the late 1950s and the early 1960s are unclear, though some time before 1964 he was promoted to the first senior officer rank, comandante.

coronel stripes

In 1964 Galarreta was appointed to the Tribunal de Reconocimiento Médico. The appointment effectively terminated Galarreta's service at sea and commenced his spell in navy medical administration, where he was noted, for example, in 1965. He also held additional roles in other similar bodies, for example, in 1966 Galarreta served as comandante médico in the Junta Facultativa de Reconocimiento Médico. He would remain in the administrative branch of the services until the end of his navy career, and some time in the late 1960s or early 1970s promoted to teniente coronel. At this rank in 1973 he served as médico adscrito in the Tribunal de Exámenes para el Cuerpo de Sanidad and is recorded in the same role in 1976. In 1977 he became Jefe del Servicio de Salud Mental y Luchas Sanitarias and a member of the Comisión de Ordenanzas Generales de la Armada. In the late 1970s he became a member of Delegación Permanente de la Junta Superior de Acción Social de la Armada, the navy branch entrusted with social issues like education, financial assistance, sports, holidays, retirement, religious service, etc. He performed this role until 1979; at the time he became Vocal y Asesor Médico de la Delegación de Acción Social de la Armada. In 1979 he served as president of the Junta de Reconocimiento Médico at the Tribunal de Exámenes, where as médico adscrito he was noted also in 1980. The exact year of his retirement is unknown but probably fell on the early 1980s; he retired as a full colonel.

== Historian ==
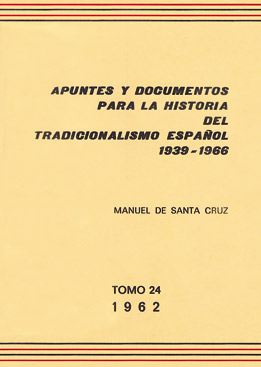
Apuntes...

Galarreta did not receive a professional education as an historian, though from the onset he was tempted by historiography; his academic dissertation was dedicated to the history of medicine and focused on José Gómez Ocaña. Some time later he re-worked the thesis; in 1958 it got a prize from the Asociación de Escritores Médicos and the same year it was published by Consejo Superior de Investigaciones Científicas. It remained Galarreta's sole historiographic work for decades. In 1979 as "Manuel de Santa Cruz" he issued the first volume of what became a massive series, titled Apuntes y documentos para la historia del tradicionalismo español. The subsequent 28 volumes were published until 1993 and covered the history of Carlism from 1939 to 1966; each volume was dedicated to one year. Though published irregularly, all volumes retained the same format of soft-cover booklets; they were issued by different Seville and Madrid publishing houses. Volumes 1–14 were financed by Galarreta himself, subsequent ones were funded by Fundación Larramendi.

Apuntes... is a work which adopted a somewhat hybrid format, in-between a typical historiographic account and a printed set of original documents. Though the backbone of each volume are excerpts from or complete written sources, reproduced literally, they are enveloped in the author's narrative which sets the background and advances an interpretative perspective. In the case of most chapters the documentary part prevails, though in some sections the documents quoted are scarce and the descriptive part takes most of the space. Each volume is structured into some 10–15 chapters, organized either around specific threads or specific events. Each chapter falls into 5 to 15 sub-sections, usually though not always centred upon a specific document or a series of documents. Since each volume quotes some 70 to 100 sources, the entire series refers to some 2,500 documents. Each volume ends with a review of major books and periodicals published during the year in question, an index of persons and a summary. In total, the series amounts to some 6,000 pages.

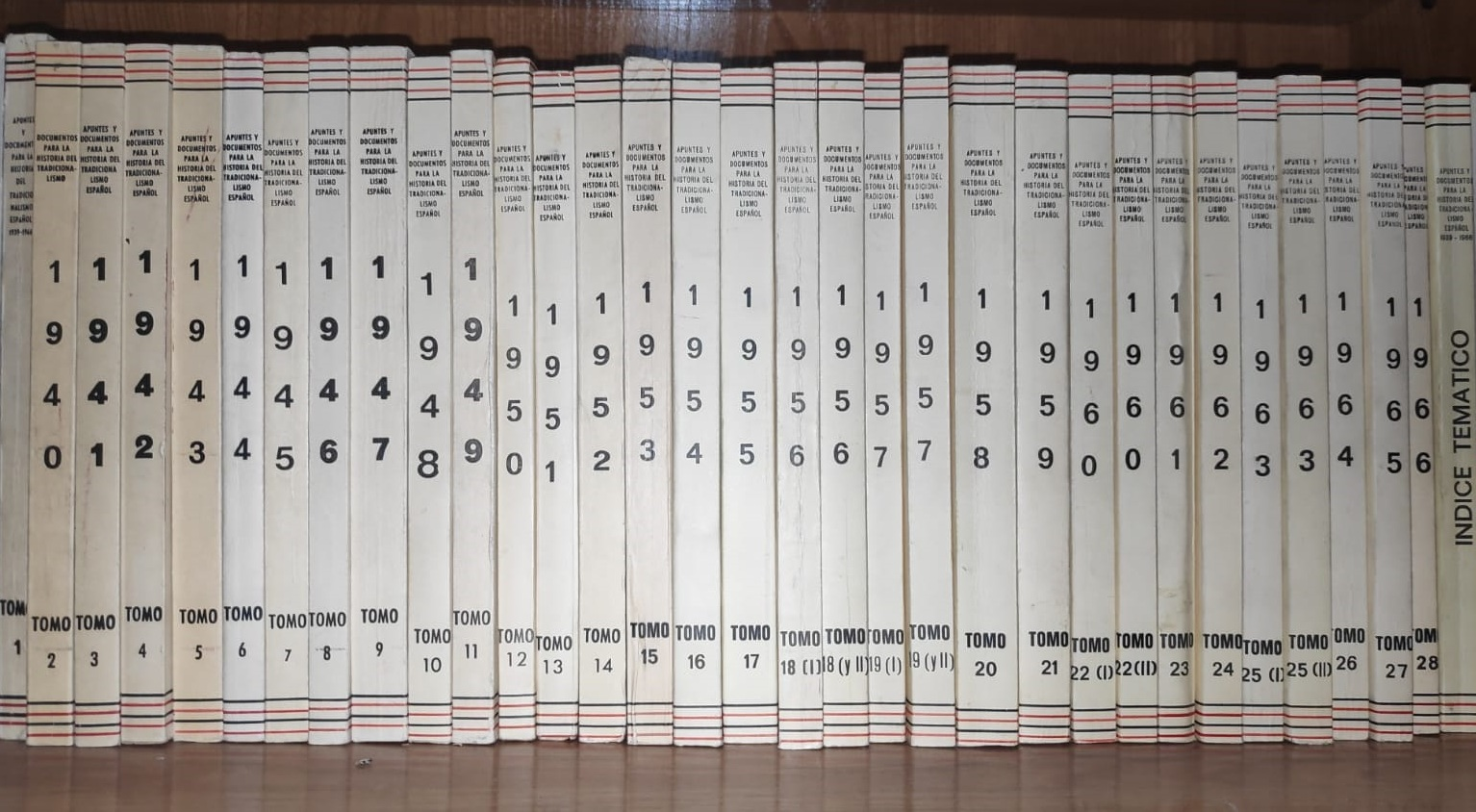
all volumes of Apuntes...

Documents referred to are not necessarily reproduced in extenso; many are presented either as lengthy excerpts or as brief parts, at times reduced to few sentences. They fall into 8 major categories: 1. private letters, 2. official documents issued by Carlist structures, 3. articles from party bulletins or party newspapers, 4. Carlist leaflets and brochures, 5. articles from the non-Carlist press, also a foreign one, 6. documents issued by official administrative structures, 7. excerpts from various books, and 8. private documents (notes, pro-memoria, minutes, and drafts) by various individuals. The work does not contain any archival references and usually there are no footnotes or any sort of guidance as to where the document quoted has been consulted. Exceptions is rather infrequent and loose in-text information, e.g. "en el archivo del Doctor Gassió se halla...". Letters quoted are at times referred with no date; also excerpts from books are at times referred with incomplete bibliographical information.

== Catholic activist ==
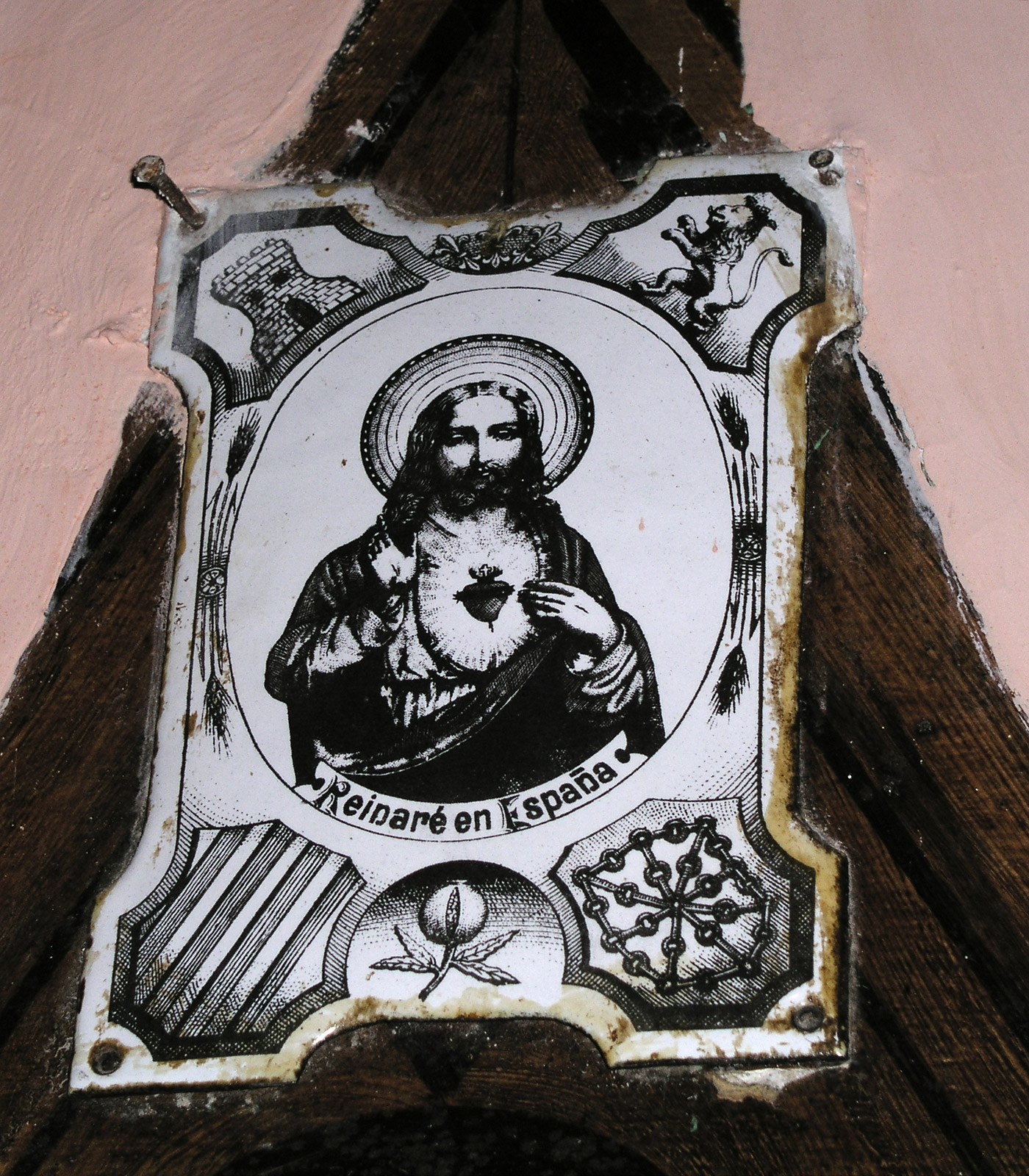
Reinaré en España

The first Galarreta's publication flavored with Catholic sentiment was a 240-page booklet Más allá de la deontología médica (1962); it discussed his medical experiences framed in general religious reflection. Since the mid-1960s he engaged against what he perceived as "confusion stemming from the Vatican Council", which in his opinion endangered the Catholic unity of Spain. First he tried to re-launch a series of dinners known as Cenas de Cristo Rey; they were designed as measures of countering the new currents and advocated the Integrist vision of religion and public life. At the same time he joined works of the Centro de Estudios Históricos Tomás Zumalacarregui, created as sort of a think-tank by Traditionalists who abandoned the progressist prince Carlos Hugo; later he formed the board of the related Fundación Elías de Tejada. In the 1980s Galarreta engaged in the movement of so-called Uniones Seglares, grass-root organizations set up to oppose secularization and promote religious values. In the early 1990s he emerged as a key person within the movement, and organized annual Jornadas almost single-handedly. In 1997 he became president of the confederation, at the time named the Junta Nacional para la Reconquista de la Unidad Católica de España; its key objective was re-institutionalization of the Catholic unity of Spain. Galarreta remained active in the movement until his death, taking part in countless congresses, conferences and lectures. The movement promoted the presence of religion in public space, advocated traditional values, popularized history, analyzed politics and warned against threats, including these reportedly posed by Freemasonry, so-called "European values" and the growing Muslim presence in Spain. He was also highly skeptical about the pontificate of John Paul II.

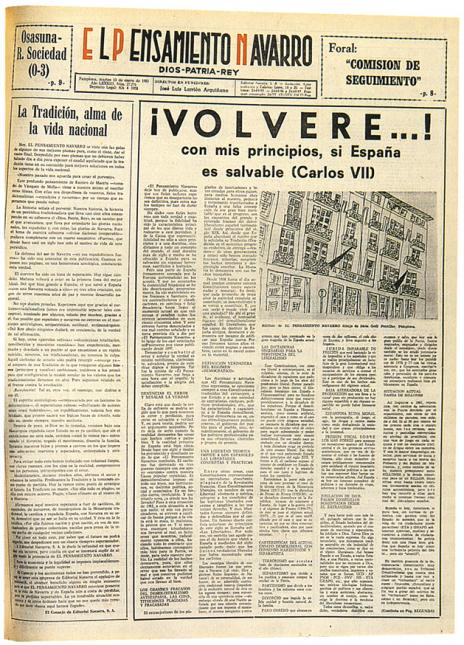
El Pensamiento Navarro

Galarreta's religious missionary activity was expressed also throughout his press contributions. Initially, as a member of the military Galarreta was not supposed to publish pieces which might have sounded anti-governmental. Hence, given his criticism towards the planned Francoist law on religious liberty, he started writing using numerous pen-names. His early contributions are difficult to trace; his later pen-names identified are “J. Ulibarri”, “Aurelio de Gregorio”, “P. Loido”, “P. Echániz”, “El Serviola” and “Dr. Felipe Fernández Arqueo”. Since the 1960s he was publishing in the Carlist Pamplonese daily El Pensamiento Navarro. Other Traditionalist periodicals he contributed to include ¿Qué pasa?. In the 1960s he joined forces with Eugenio Vegas Latapié, who represented a competitive branch of monarchism, to found Ciudad Católica, and kept contributing to this prestigious intellectual review during the decades to come. In the 1970s he commenced collaboration with the Blas Piñar-related weekly Fuerza Nueva. In the early 1980s Galarreta was the moving spirit behind founding Siempre P’alante, a popular Navarrese periodical strongly flavored with the Integrist vision of culture and religion; at the same time he was writing for a prestigious intellectual monthly Verbo. To some of these periodicals he kept contributing almost until his last days and Siempre P'alante barely outlived him. Galarreta contributed minor pieces to some Traditionalism-related books. His propagandistic activities involved also a more combative format.

== Carlist ==
Carlist standard

There is no information on political preferences of Galarreta's paternal ancestors and it is not clear what if any political grouping was supported by his father. However, it is known that his maternal forefathers were related to Carlism and his grandfather, Miguel Mocoroa, joined the legitimist troops during the Third Carlist War. During his teenage years in San Sebastián in the mid-1930s, Galarreta was already a member of the Carlist youth organisation, AET. He also spent long spells in the Gipuzkoan Villafranca de Ordicia, the Basque town entirely dominated by Carlists; he participated in their rituals, including evening rosary intended for the Carlist king, Alfonso Carlos. When serving in the navy (in 1954 he was capitán, in 1964 comandante, and in 1974 teniente coronel) he was hardly in a position to voice genuine political preferences, and none of the works dealing with Carlist history during early Francoism note his direct engagement in the movement. The first notes on Galarreta's links with the Carlist political organization come from the early 1960s, when he formed the intellectual entourage of the then Jefe Delegado, José María Valiente. In 1963 he was the co-author and the moving spirit behind El Carlismo y la Unidad Católica, a document issued by the Comunión Tradicionalista, signed by Valiente and 18 regional leaders. However, he did not assume any role in Carlist structures.

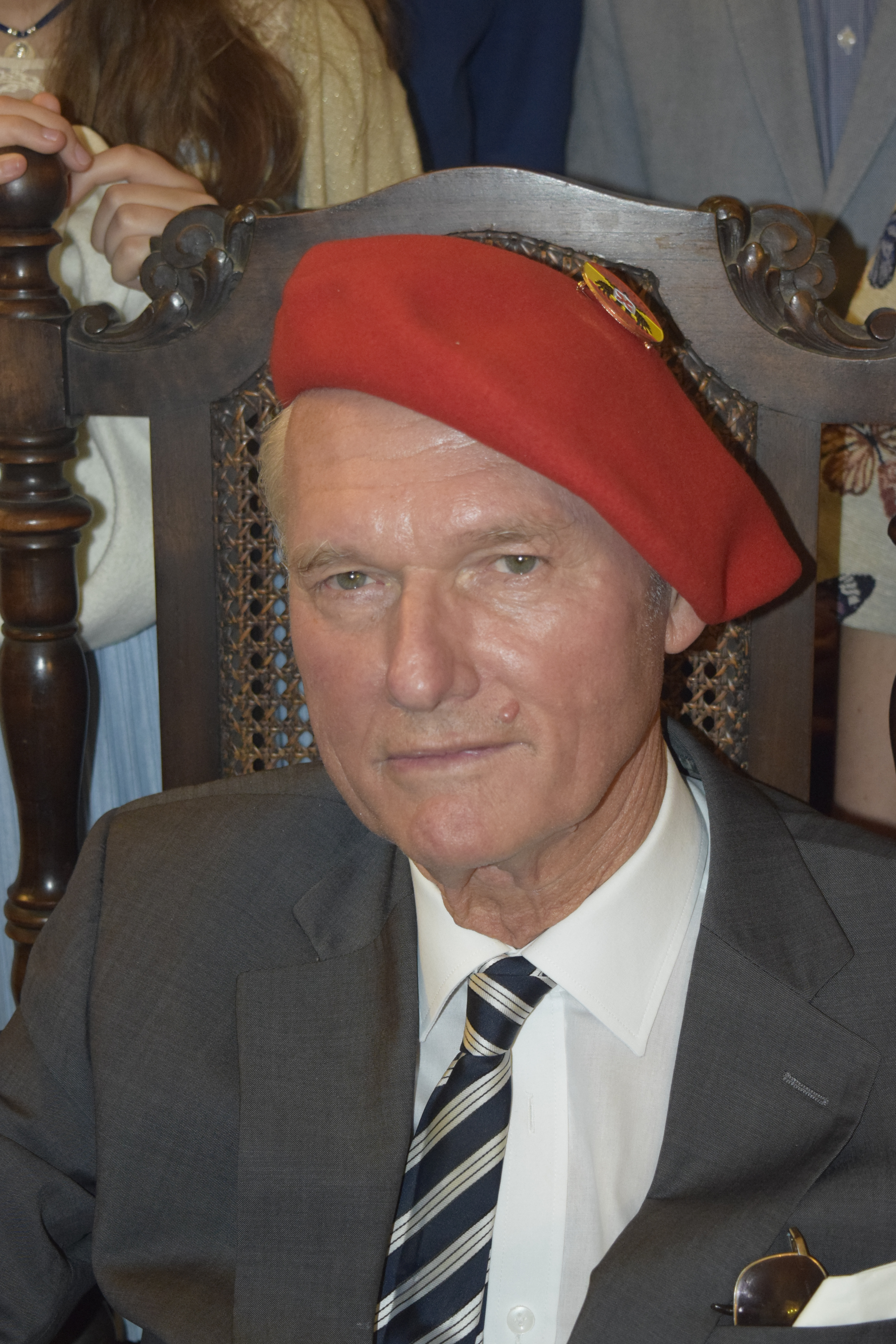
Sixto Enrique de Borbón

In the 1980s and thanks to his Apuntes... series Galarreta started to emerge as a Carlist pundit and intellectual, but again with no formal party affiliations. He took part in labors of the 1986 congress, which was supposed to unite various branches of Traditionalism; they gave birth to an umbrella organization Comunión Tradicionalista Carlista, yet when listing attendants of related religious events, the press listed Galarreta separately, not among the CTC representatives. His historiographic work, culminating in the 1980s, was done with no support of organized Carlist structures. At the turn of the decade Galarreta collaborated with Lealtad, a bulletin issued by an ephemeral offshoot branch named Tradición Española. When the movement again got fragmented between CTC and Comunión Tradicionalista, Galarreta approached the latter, attracted mostly by its loyalty to Marcel Lefebvre and his vision of Catholicism. He forged friendly links with Rafael Gambra, in the 1990s considered the supreme authority on Traditionalism and since 2001 the formal leader of CT. At times he engaged in polemics on doctrine, for example, in 1997 with the Progressist vision of Carlism or in 2003 with doctrinal re-interpretations by the Traditionalist Alvaro d’Ors. Following the death of Traditionalist pundits Rafael Gambra (2004), Alvaro d’Ors (2004), Francisco Canals (2009) and Juan Vallet de Goytisolo (2011), Galarreta emerged as "el úlitmo carlista histórico". In 2013 Sixto Enrique de Borbón, dynastic leader of the CT-related branch of Carlism, awarded him Cruz de la Orden de Legitimitad Proscrita. His health permitting, also as a nonagenarian Galarreta took part in cultural events related to Carlism; in 2017 he was present during the presentation of a book on the ETA war against Carlism.

== Reception and legacy ==
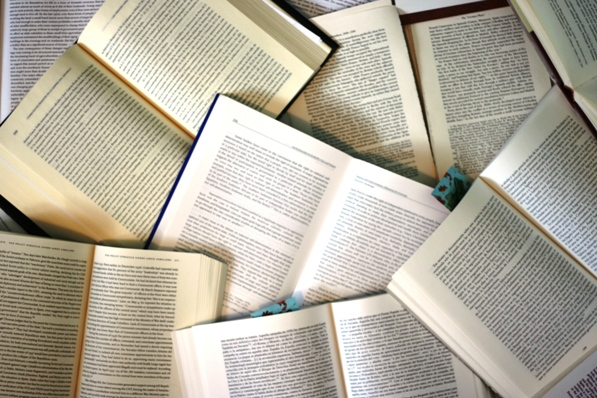

Until the end of Francoism Galarreta remained unknown; he published under nick-names, did not engage in politics and did not hold any role in Carlist structures. He started to emerge as a recognized personality only in the 1980s. On the one hand, it was related to his activity in Uniones Seglares, especially that in the 1990s he became one of the key people behind the movement and in 1997 he ascended to its presidency. On the other hand, in the late 1980s it became already clear that his Apuntes... series was not an ephemeral effort, but that it assumed a massive size comparable to historiographic series on Carlism by Melchor Ferrer. Though until the mid-1980s Apuntes... were greeted with almost total silence in the world of professional historiography and Carlism alike, things changed when the Fundación Larramendi took over publishing the series. As a result, on both accounts in the 1990s Galarreta emerged among patriarchs of Traditionalism, especially in its Carlist version, and in the early 21st century he was viewed as “el úlitmo carlista histórico”, celebrated as the authority on history and doctrine. Since the turn of the century he was recognized by some academic historians like Ricardo de la Cierva, José Luis Comellas and Javier Tusell, who considered working on joint projects. His death was acknowledged by both CT and CTC, apart from numerous Catholic institutions and periodicals, though by very few mainstream media.

Following his death Galarreta is recorded chiefly as the author of Apuntes..., viewed as a continuation of the “official” Carlist history by Ferrer. Opinions about the series differ. Within Traditionalism it is viewed as an enormous work which remains "referencia inexcusable" for every student of late Carlism and Francoist Spain. Also non-Traditionalist scholars like Ricardo de la Cierva recognize its “oceanic proportions”. However, there are authors who prefer to name Galarreta "el recopilador" rather than a historian. Others stigmatize him as a representative of "línea carlista tradicionalista" or "historiografía neotradicionalista", which is a euphemism for bias and political zeal. An academic scholar notes that Galarreta's work is interesting "desde un punto de vista documental" and "might be useful", but only once is it "liberado de comentarios profundamente comprometidos". Many point to his Integrist or “en clave neointegrista” outlook, which allegedly plagues Apuntes..., though others limit themselves to noting “parcial óptica ideológica” and Galarreta's nature of "combatiente idealista" and "doctrinario". This stance made him see the decline of Carlism not in terms of dynastical turmoil, social change, doctrinal deviation by prince Carlos Hugo, or Francoist repression, but as the result of "defección de la Iglesia después el Concilio Vaticano II". Some claim that the content of Apuntes... is at times "superimposed or mixed up". Regardless of the controversies, Galarreta's work remains a vital source of references for the history of Carlism during the Franco era; one recent PhD work quoted him 63 times, and another referred to him 65 times. A volume with Galarreta's political writings was published in 2025.

== See also ==
- Carlism
- Traditionalism (Spain)
- Historiography on Carlism during the Francoist era
