= Historiography on Carlism during the Francoist era =

Aspect of Carlist history

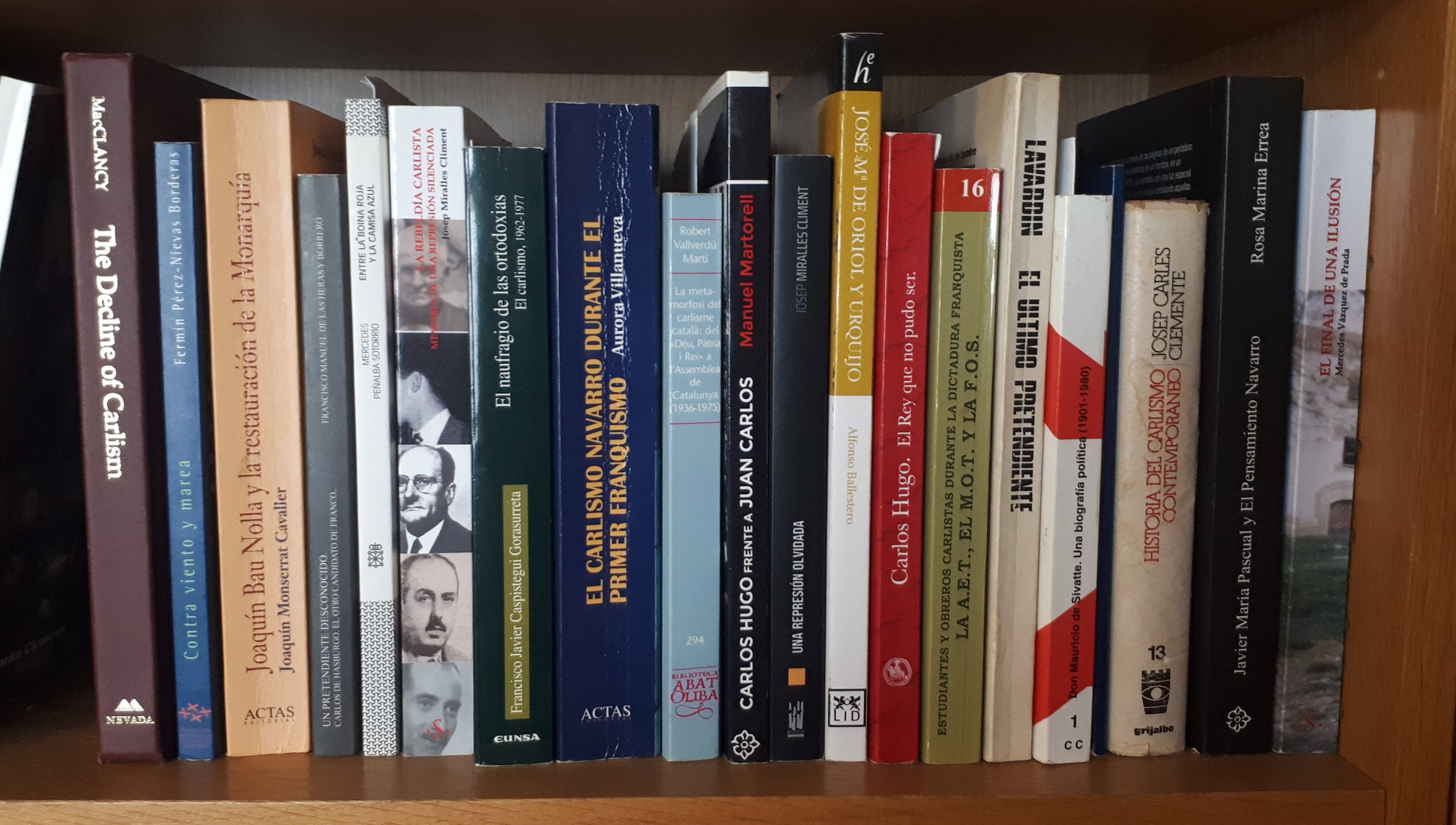
some books on Carlism during the Franco regime

During 40 years of post-Francoist Spain there have been some 200 works published on Carlist history during the Franco regime (1939 to 1975; the Civil War period is not discussed here); there are some 100 authors who have contributed. The number of major studies – books or unpublished PhD works - stands at around 50, the rest are articles in specialized reviews (pieces in popular newspapers or periodicals are not acknowledged here). Except some 15 titles, almost all have been published in Spain. The interest was scarce in the late 1970s and early 1980s, it grew in the late 1980s and since the early 1990s it remains stable, with some 30 titles published every 5 years.

== Overviews and synthetic works ==
A student unfamiliar with the subject should probably start with a large chapter dedicated to post-Civil War Carlism in general historical synthesis by Canal (2000): comprehensive and non-partisan, it provides a good overview. Another option is a concise 20-page review of Caspistegui Gorasurreta and Vázquez de Prada (1995). Definitely less valuable is a booklet of Dongil (2011), dedicated almost exclusively to the period in question and equally general, but flawed by a loose essayist style. Alternatively, there is an article intended to provide a helicopter-view summary, but overfocused on internal fragmentation of the movement, written by Brioso (1996), a sketchy overview in a section of the book of Alférez (1995) and final chapter of Blinkhorn's (1975) study, written during commencing transition and burdened with illusions of the author. There are 3 works to be followed as exhaustive, general in-depth attempts to capture the Carlist history during Francoism, all resulting from PhD research. The works of Caspistegui (1997) and Martorell (2009) are splendidly documented, though the former focuses on the 1960s and 1970s rather than the 1940s and 1950s, while the latter pursues a partisan, Progressist claim. Exactly the opposite, Traditionalist claim is pursued in the thesis of Rodón (2015), the work founded on scarce own research. Final pages of Sagarra and Andrés (2014) provide an illustrated and geography-focused overview. Works recommended only to students familiar with the subject and armed with appropriate criticism are writings on late Carlism by Clemente (1977 and 2003), chapters in the general overview of Pérez-Nievas (1999) and last essays in the volume of Miralles Climent (2004). A general synthesis on right-wing politics during Francoism by Gil Pecharromán (2019) contains many paragraphs on Carlism. The very recent work of an experienced Navarrese statesman Allí Aranguren (2021) is specifically calibrated as discussion on relations between Carlism and Francoism, with focus on the 1939-1955 period.

== Regional studies ==
Carlism has been traditionally most active in 3 areas: Vascongadas, Navarre and Catalonia. Unfortunately, there is no attempt to capture the post-1939 movement history in the Basque Country in general; either specific sub-periods or specific issues are covered in scarce passages of the available books by López (2000), Estornes (1976) and Garate (1980) or the articles of Toquero (1987), Luengo (1990), Sánchez (1994), Calvo (1999), Molina (2008), and Vázquez de Prada (2012). For Navarre, apart from a very sketchy overview of Miranda (1988), there is excellent book of Villanueva (1998), which, however, together with her minor contributions (1997, 2003) deals only with the so-called „primer franquismo”. Mid-Francoism is covered by Vázquez de Prada (1995, 2006, 2011). There is one major work (Carmona 1978) and few lesser ones (Larraza 2005, Baraibar 2006, Larraza, Baraibar 2013) which deal with political struggle to control the Pamplona ayuntamiento. A handful of articles traces cultural changes in Navarrese Carlism, almost all written by Caspistegui (1992, 1996, 1997, 1999, 2004). The very last period is tackled in a partisan book by Errea (2007), which nevertheless provides detailed info on El Pensamiento Navarro and the Pamplonese realm. The best covered area is Catalonia thanks to an exhaustive study of Vallverdú (2014), with a minor piece provided also by Thomàs (1992), Cubero (1993), Canals (1995) and Campás (2007). One book partially deals with the Francoist period in Valladolid (Herrera 2013) another one in Valencia (Pérez 2010) and one in Castellon (Miralles Climent, 2009). In case of Andalusia the late Francoist period in Seville has been targeted by Somé Laserna (2011) and Senent Sansegundo (2025), while the early one in Huelva by González Orta (2024). The Galician province of Orense earned a monograph by Rego Nieto (1985).

== Biographies and similar ==
There are a number of works which focus on individuals, though some, as general biographical studies, only partially deal with Carlism and politics. Perhaps the first one to be listed is definitely hagiographical biography of Don Javier by Borbón, Clemente and Cubero (1997). His son, Don Carlos Hugo, is featured twice by Clemente in 1999, and 2000, apart from a book by Francisco Manuel de las Heras y Borrero, which discusses also Don Javier, Don Sixto and other Borbon-Parmas (2010) and chapters in a book by Ferrer and Puga (2001) and Balanso (1994). Maria Teresa de Borbon is presented by Clemente (2002). The longtime political leader Manuel Fal earned hagiographical booklets by Fidaldo and Burgueño (1980) and Martínez (1998), apart from an article by Clemente (1978). Another leader José María Valiente has been dedicated one article by Vázquez de Prada (2012). The claimant Don Carlos Pio earned no biography as such, but his bid for the throne and Carloctavismo in general is dealt with in three books (Montells 1995, Heras 2004, Alcala 2012) and four articles (Heras 1983, Bolinaga 2007, Sánchez 2013, Vázquez de Prada 2011). Jaime del Burgo is discussed in one book by his son (del Burgo 2003) and in one article (Garralda 2008). Alcala (2001) published a partisan but highly recommended book on Sivatte, which provides much information on Sivattismo and Catalan Carlism as well; far less interesting are books of Monserrat (2001) on Joaquín Bau, Ballestero (2014) on José M. Oriol, Zavala (2008) on Antonio Arrue, articles on the latter by San Martín (1976), Martorell (2011) and Sudupe (2012), and another one by Wilhelmsen (2007) on Lizarza Inda. Rather peculiar contributions are the album of Piñeiro (2005) with paintings of Boveda and the work of Carmona (1995), discussing how Alfonso Comín turned from a Carlist to a Communist. Rodezno, Arauz de Robles and Elías de Tejada are discussed in one article (2009).

== Sub-periods covered ==
The so-called early Francoism was treated in major work of Miralles Climent (2018), while later years of the regime were discussed by the same author in another large book, published in 2023. Apart from studies on Navarre listed earlier there are two books which focus on the Civil War, the period not covered here, and contain minor passages related to the following years, namely the works of Peñas (1996) and Peñalba (2013), 2022. Mid-Francoism was targeted in particular by a 2016 book of Vázquez de Prada, her minor works of 2005 and 2009 and a manuscript by Cubero (1989). Special attention is needed when reading the works of Lavardín (1976), Massó (2005) and Ipiña (2010), insider stories from the project of launching Carlos Hugo in 1957-1966. Late-Francoism is covered in two recent PhD works. The one written by García Riol (2015) is largely repetitive though also highly focused, non-partisan, based on newly available documents and pursuing a handful of interesting concepts. The one written by Miralles Climent (2015) is a first-hand account from a Partido Carlista militant, perhaps the most instructive work written so far when it comes to understanding the rise of "socialismo autogestionario"; it contains also some 300 pages of documentary appendices. Minor works on late Francoism are articles offered by Cubero (1990), Sánchez (2004), Raguer (2004), del Burgo (2011), Campas (2013) and Ferrer (2015). A PhD dissertation was dedicated to the 1968-1982 period by Senent (2021), with a later scaled-down article (2024). Specific episodes are addressed in works of the Zubiaurs (2012), Rodón (2015) and the book by Domingo-Arnau (1998). A number of works, though generally studying Francoism and extreme-Right groupings in the early 1970s, offer some insight into the Carlist realm as well, especially the books of de la Cierva (1978, 1981 and 1987), Rodríguez (1994 and 1997) and the articles by Gallego (2008) and Casals (2009). Carlism and late Francoism was the subject of a series of lectures, organized in late 2018 in Pamplona. Works by Senent (2020, 2022) and del Corno (2009) target the post-Francoist era, but contain large passages dedicated to final years of Francoism.

== Key threads ==
In terms of key threads followed there are clearly two which attract most attention: Carlist position towards the Francoist regime and internal conflicts within Carlism, sometimes both merged as having been closely interrelated. Most of the works quoted earlier deal with these topics one way or another. All scholars – also those writing from Traditionalist and Progressist perspective - advance the thesis of intrinsic hostility between Carlism and Francoism, but there is no major scholarly work which systematically and comprehensively captures the problem of mutual relations between the two. The works approaching the topic are a collection of 3 essays by Martorell and Miralles (2009), a brief study of Calero Delso (2003), an analysis of the 1942 crisis by Thomas (2016), of the 1956 deadlock by Zaratiegui and Garcia (2017) and a synthetic overview by Alli Aranguren (2021). In case of internal conflict it is quite the opposite: there are many works dedicated almost entirely to the problem, but they offer competitive visions emphasizing either change or continuity. The first one is championed by already noted book of Caspistegui; apart from minor works listed earlier, it is presented also in some sketchy overviews. Blinkhorn (1991), Vázquez de Prada, Caspistegui (1991 and 1995) and MacClancy (1998), tend to view the change sympathetically, while Bartyzel (2011) builds a case-study, striving to present a unique European phenomen of a large and historically grounded political movement turned into its own ruinous negation. The key work adhering to the continuity reading is already noted PhD thesis of Martorell and the booklet of Pérez-Nievas. Countless and highly repetitive books of Clemente, dealing with the history of Carlism in general, advance the same theory, also from the Progressist perspective (1995, 1999, 2006, 2011, 2013). There is historiographical work which adheres to the continuity theory from the Traditionalist perspective, though the book of Gambra (1976) seems to fall rather into philosophy. A particular and very focused case-study is an article of Vázquez de Prada on Carlism and the Francoist law on religious liberty (2017).

== Studies on theory and theorists ==
There are a number of works which are useful to a student of Carlist history during Francoism, but intended rather as studies on philosophy and political science. The Progressist perspective, overrepresented in historiography, is hardly present here; the only work noted is a treaty by the claimant himself (de Borbón 1977). On the other hand, there are abundant studies dedicated to Traditionalist thinkers of the era and written almost entirely from hagiographic or at least sympathetic positions. Elías de Tejada was dedicated a book by Ayuso (1994) and a one edited by Sánchez (1995); smaller pieces dedicated to the extremeño keep appearing in Annales de la Fundación Elías de Tejada (Cantero 1995, Ayuso 1999, Cecotti 2005, Ayuso 2008) and other periodicals or books (Lamsdorff 1975, Lorca 1978, Vallet 1981, Díaz 1988, Fernandéz de la Mora 1989, Cienfuegos 1996, Turco 1998, Cuenca 2000, Giovine 2002, Bartyzel 2014). Rafael Gambra earned a book by Ayuso (1998) and a commemorative issue of Annales de la Fundacion Elías de Tejada (2004), plus articles in other reviews (Ayuso 1998, Canals 2004, Forment 2009, Alvear 2009, Alvear 2014). Similar intra-Traditionalist approach is a general study with many chapters dedicated to the Francoist era, written by Bartyzel (2015). Unique non-partisan works are a general analysis with some sections on post-Civil-War Carlism by Novella (2007), González (2005) and his later brief encyclopedical entry (2008). A work somewhat broader in scope as focusing on Traditionalism rather than on Carlism is a PhD thesis of Rodríguez Núñez (2014).

== Specific approaches ==
In historiography on Carlism during Francoism there is a tendency to depart from political analysis and focus on culture and anthropology. It is championed especially by MacClancy with his somewhat tilted but extremely interesting book (2000) and an article (2009), though also by Caspistegui with a number of his contributions (1997, 1999, 2007, 2012, 2013, 2018), apart from studies on Navarre listed earlier. The phenomenon of Montejurra, apart from both mentioned authors, is discussed also by Clemente (1978) and - with regard to 1969 - by Martorell (2006), while Mártires de la Tradición event is discussed in the article by Senent (2020). The press is focused on by Cubero (1995a, 1995b), Clemente (1999) and Alquézar (2013), while cinema is treated by Moral (2002). Finally, other perspectives are offered by Blinkhorn (1990), Calvo (1992) and Miralles (2005). Structural framework is at the foreground in very few works which study specific dedicated Carlist organizations; the one which attracted most attention is GAC, discussed in books by Onrubia (2001) and Clemente (2016) and articles by MacClancy (1989) and Porro (1999). MOT earned a minor piece by Cubero (2014) and a major volume - composed mostly of documents, with rather brief analytics - by Miralles (2007), which discusses also AET; the latter is separately treated by Vazquez de Prada (1998) and Juncosa (2002), while FARC was addressed by Onrubia (1999, 2003). An ex-combatant organisation is approached by Nonell (2001). The ETA war against Carlism, partially covering the late Francoist period, is discussed by Ibáñez (2017). Unfortunately, there is no socio-economic approach to history of Carlism during Francoism, though incursions into the area may be found in the article of García Riol (2016) and the paper of Miralles Climent (2000).

== Meta-historiography ==
Two works are documentary compilations and might serve as printed sources; the key one massive series by Santa Cruz and another is a book edited by Clemente (1994). There have been already a few meta-historiographical works published. Perhaps the one to start with is a bibliography prepared by Rubio and Talavera (2012), which does not cover works published beyond Spain and those after 2012; moreover, the authors do not quote ISBN numbers and overlooked some of the titles listed here. Another group of works are reviews of published works (not listed here) and attempts to discuss recent trends in Carlist historiography, partially covering also the Francoist era. A fairly old one is a 16-year-old chapter in already quoted work of Canal and similarly outdated articles of Larramendi (1996), Martorell (2000) and Gonzalez (2000); later essays, almost entirely irrelevant for students of Francoism, are those of Boyd (2003) Molina (2008), Canal (2011), Somé (2012) and Olábarri (2014). Appallingly relevant remains a note by Bullón de Mendoza (2013). The same question – related to partiality and bias – is tackled head on and specifically with regard to Carlism by Martínez (2002). Some proposals for future research were formulated - and partially met - 30 years ago by Blinkhorn (1986) and more recently, by Caspistegui (2008).
