= José Luis Comellas =

Spanish astronomer (1929–2021)

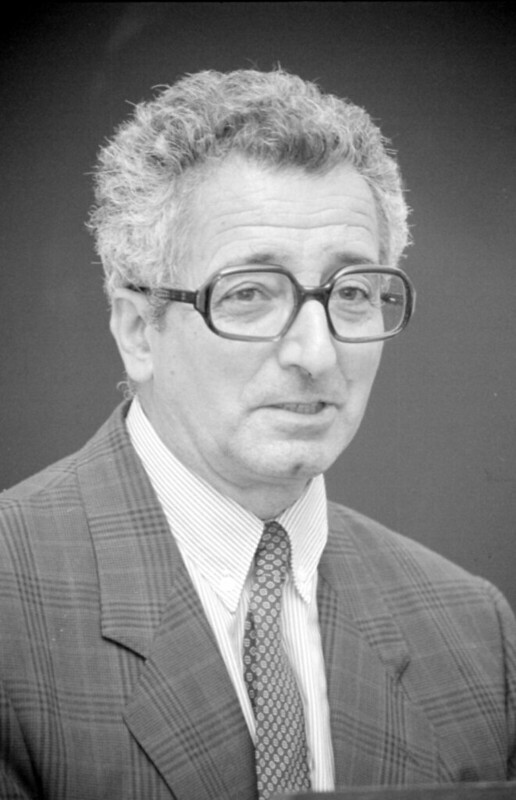
José Luis Comellas, 1993

José Luis Comellas García-Llera (2 April 1929 – 23 April 2021) was a Spanish astronomer, historian, and academic.
