= Francisco Canals Vidal =

Spanish Catholic philosopher, theologian and academic (1922–2009)

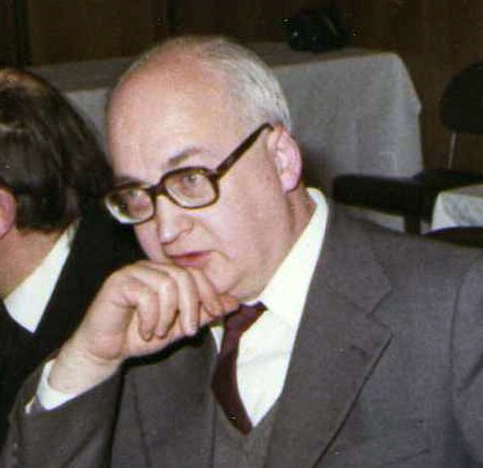
Francisco Canals Vidal
- Born: Francisco Canals Vidal; 30 May 1922; Barcelona, Spain
- Died: 7 February 2009 (aged 86); Barcelona, Spain
- Occupation: Academic
- Notable work: Sobre la esencia del conocimiento (1987)

Francisco Canals Vidal (1922–2009) was a Spanish philosopher, theologian, academic and lay Catholic activist. The longtime chair of Catedra de Metafísica of the Barcelona University, he is recognized mostly as one of the most distinguished contemporary Thomists and leader of the so-called Barcelona Thomist school; his scientific focus was mostly on metaphysics of cognition. As a theologian he specialized in theology of history and Josephology, as lay Catholic he contributed to devotion to the Sacred Heart of Jesus. Historian of ideas and partially political theorist himself, he remained related to the Carlist version of Traditionalism and is considered one of its greatest contemporary masters.

== Family and youth ==
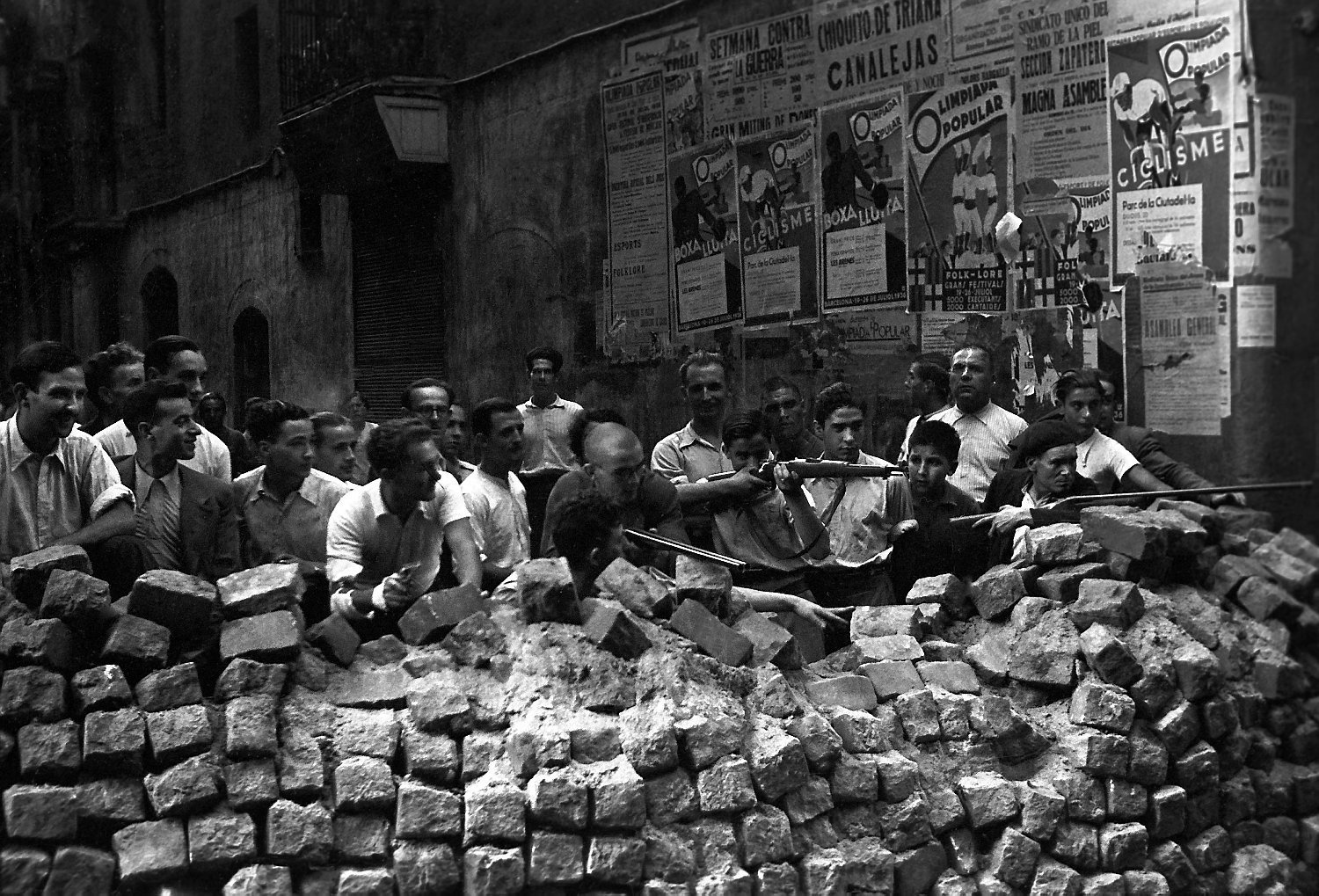
Barcelona, July 1936

The Canals family is among the best-known in Catalonia; it gained both recognition and position in the 18th century, upon co-foundation, taking over and later management of Fábricas de indianas , one of the first major textile plants in the region. The first identified direct ancestor of Francisco was his great-grandfather, Bernart Canals Papell; his son and Francisco's paternal grandfather, Emilio Canals Moret (1841-1907), was active in the Conservative Party and in 1902 entered its Barcelona Junta Ejecutiva. He married María Paz Arrieta Acuña; the couple had at least 10 children, one of them was Francisco's father, Manuel Canals Arrieta (1877-1938). The latter married Carolina Tay Sucre and fathered one child before his wife died. In 1916 he re-married with Manuela Vidal Cabot (1886-1973). The couple lived in Barcelona and had 5 children; Francisco was born as the youngest of the siblings.

The children were brought up in a fervently religious ambience. Francisco was first educated in the Piarist school at calle Diputación; in 1932, already in course of his secondary education, he moved to Colegio del Sagrado Corazón, also in Barcelona. One source claims he frequented the college until 1939, another one that living in the Republican-controlled Barcelona, he attended various establishments and obtained bachillerato shortly after the end of the Civil War. He first intended to study mathematics, but abandoned the curriculum shortly and in 1940 joined the Jesuit seminar in Veruela. His novitiate lasted only few months before Canals left the Jesuits. Disoriented and unsure about his future, bowing to the pressure of own family he decided to pursue the career of a notary and in 1943 enrolled at law in the University of Barcelona. Before graduation in 1946 and considering juridical studies introduction to general education, he commenced studying Philosophy and Letters; he graduated in 1950. In the late 1940s Canals assumed auxiliary teaching duties at Universidad de Barcelona.

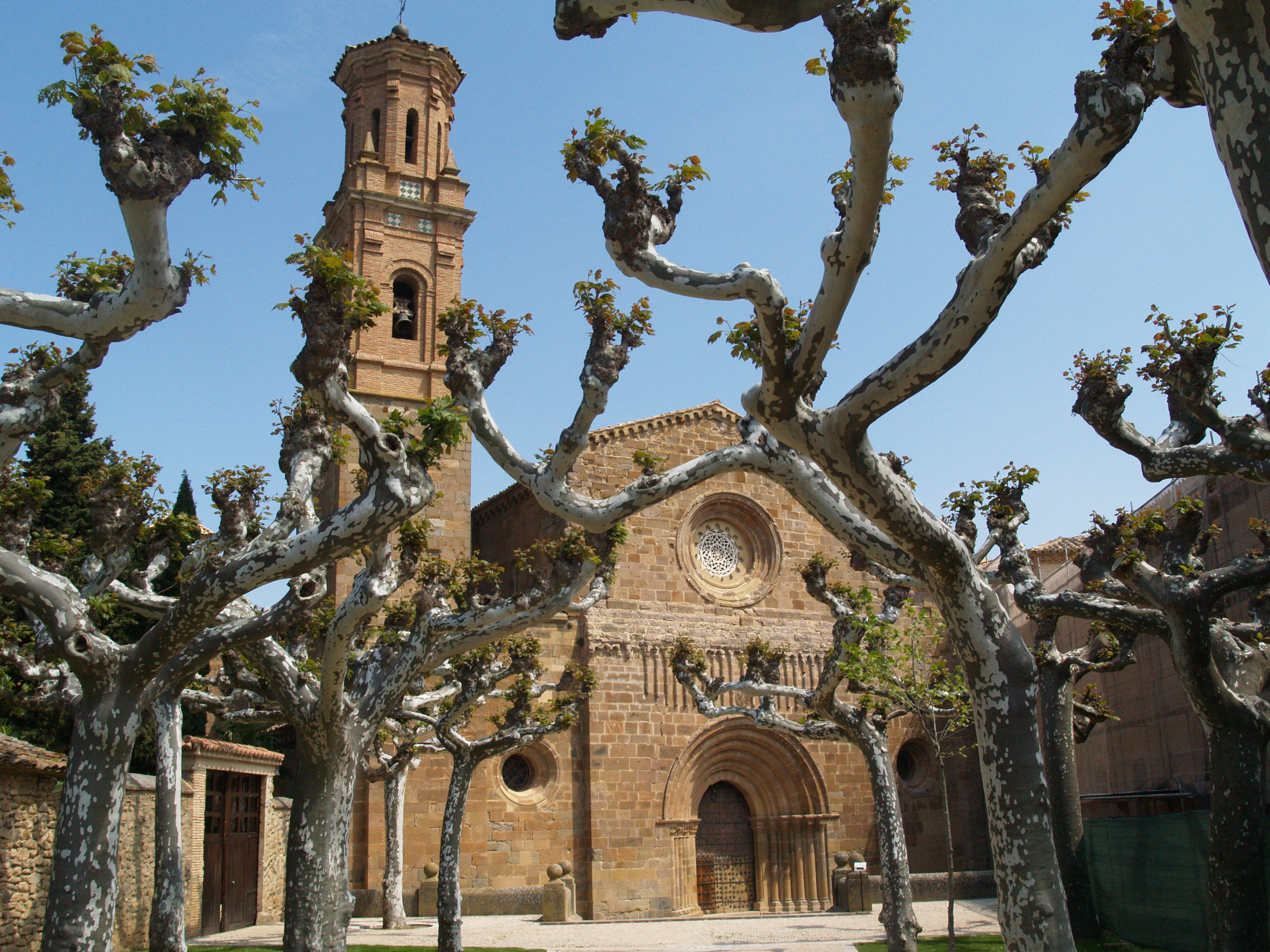
Veruela

In 1950 Canals married Isabel Suris Fábrega (died 2023); none of the sources consulted provides any information on her or her family. The couple settled in Barcelona and had 11 children. Most of them pursued career in business or as professionals; some grew to local prominence and are known in Catalonia: Manuel Canals Suris followed in the footsteps of his father and is a philosopher and anthropologist, Francesc Canals Suris is a scientist in biochemistry and head of Proteomics Lab in the Barcelona University Hospital, Carme Canals Suris is a hematologist. José María Canals Suris is active in politics related to Traditionalism; as a candidate of Comunión Tradicionalista Carlista he unsuccessfully ran for the Senate, in 2004 from Albacete and in 2008 from Girona.

== Academic ==
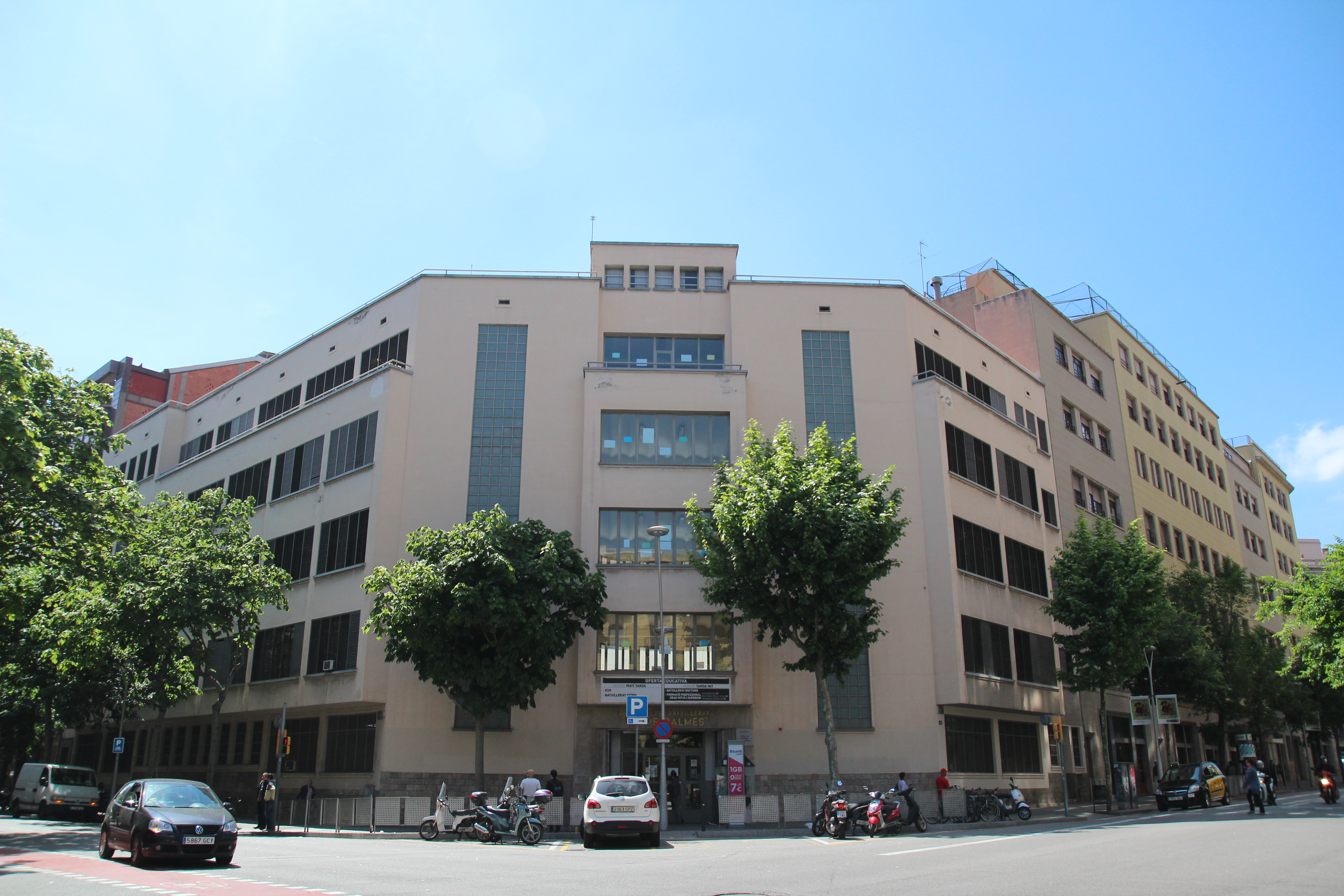
Instituto Balmes (current site)

Having graduated in Filosofía y Letras, in the early 1950s Canals decided to dedicate himself to philosophy and commenced PhD research, supervised by Jaime Bofill. His dissertation, El logos, ¿indigencia o plenitud? was accepted at the University of Madrid in 1952. Another PhD thesis, Cristianismo y Revolución, was accepted by Department of Law of the University of Barcelona in 1956. Though he performed minor teaching roles since 1949, his attempts to land chairs of Metafísica in Valencia and Derecho Político in Barcelona proved unsuccessful, yet with the latter he was contracted out to teach teoría de conocimiento. In 1958 he commenced teaching at Insituto Jaime Balmes, a prestigious Barcelona college, admitted also to Cuerpo de Catedráticos Numerarios de Institutos Nacionales de Enseñanza Media. He taught at the Institute until the mid-1960s.

Canals’ full-time employment in the Barcelona University commenced in controversial circumstances. In 1965 Manuel Sacristán Luzón, increasingly acknowledged as key Marxist philosopher and suspected to be member of the clandestine Spanish Communist Party, did not get his contract renewed; it was Canals who took over his lectures. In 1966 he assumed Cátedra de Metafísica, replacing the retired Jaime Bofill; this was the post Canals held for over 20 years, until he retired himself in 1987. In the late 1960s and during unspecified time he headed Departamento de Filosofía Teorética. In the 1970s he co-founded Società Internazionale Tommasso d’Aquino, rising to president of its Spanish section (1981-1986) and vice-president of its international executive (1991-1997); in the meantime he obtained one more PhD, in theology. In 1989 Canals was nominated to the Vatican-based Pontificia Academia Sancti Thomae Aquinatis. In the 21st century he was awarded doctor honoris causa titles by universities in Manila, Mar del Plata and the Barcelona Universidad CEU. Canals was active as lecturer also beyond the scholarly realm.

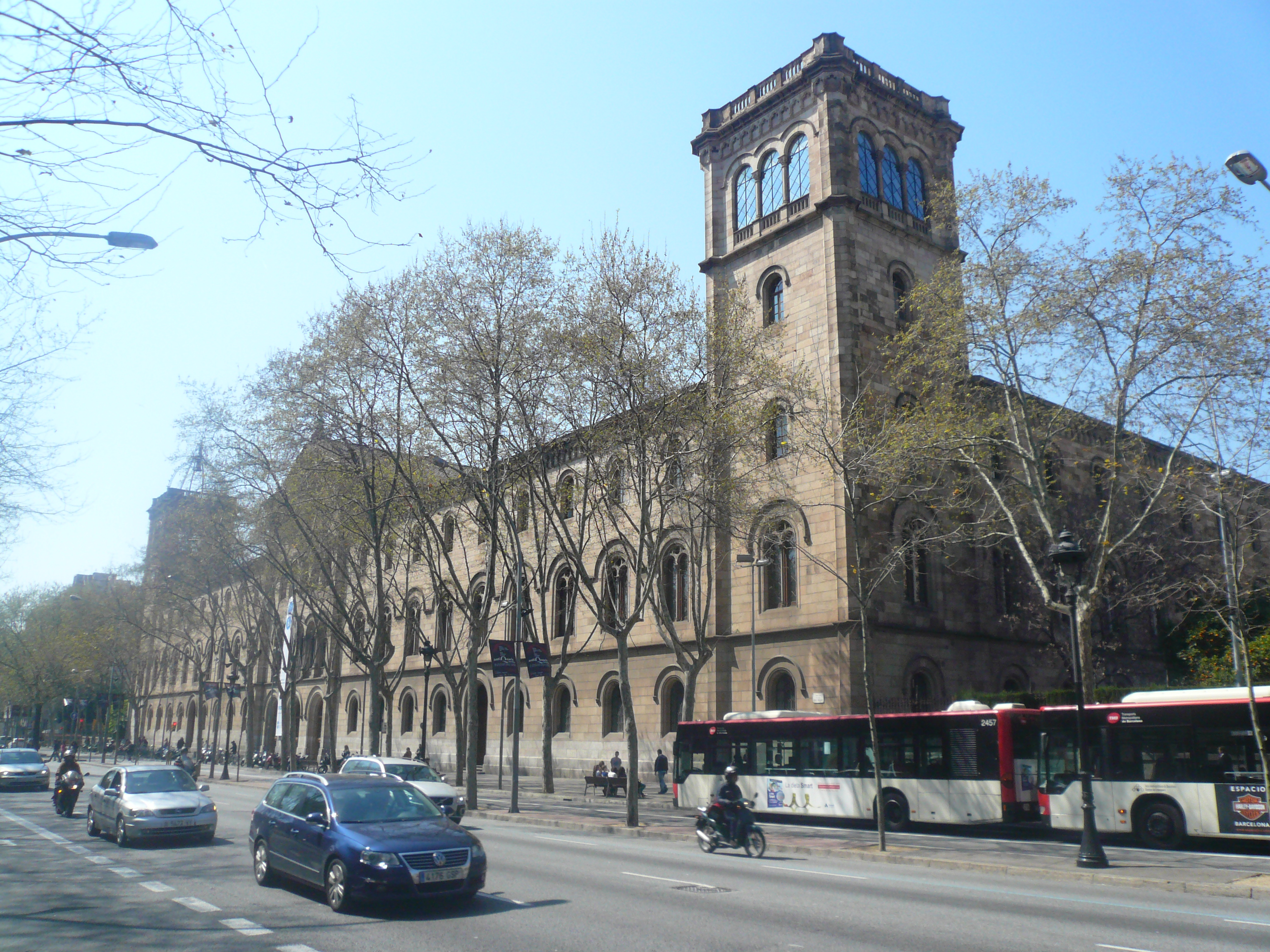
University of Barcelona

Canals approached his academic duties as service to science and religion; he saw no incompatibility in search of scientific truth and in missionary, apostolic attitude. He considered the two highly inter-related and passionately pursued both, hardly adhering to dispassionate, detached teaching formula; his lectures are recorded for precise logic, but also for fervor and animation. When replacing Sacristán, Canals claimed he accepted the job "to save students from eternal fire", to which they were exposed following frequenting lectures of his predecessor. The students went on strike and Canals narrowly missed physical assault, lambasted later for "su franquista y más que autoritaria y reaccionaria presencia" and for placing a crucifix on the wall of the lecture room. In the 1970s he was already an icon of rotten reaction; during the 1971 riots hundreds of students invaded his office and later boasted of expelling a reactionary from the faculty. During transición Canals was particularly alarmed by de-Christianization of universities and remained determined to confront the rising Marxist tide, anxious that PCE infiltrated the academic realm in pursuit of its revolutionary goals. Also later he kept denouncing subversive activities and tried to prevent marginalisation of religion and faith in the University.

== Philosopher ==
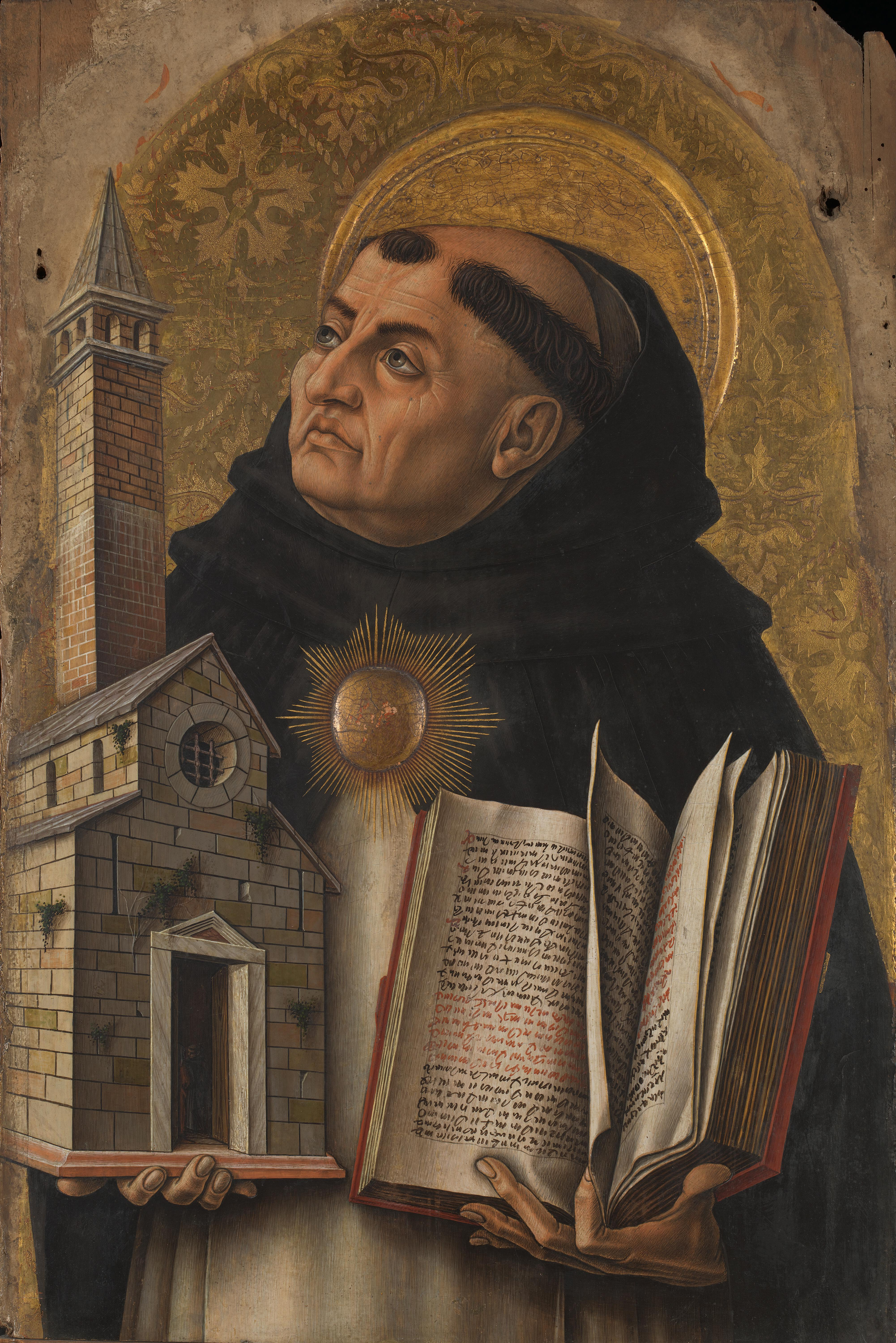
Aquinas

Canals’ interest in philosophy was triggered by Ramón Orlandis Despuig, a Catholic priest and philosopher he met in the mid-1940s; their 15-year-long intellectual co-operation and personal friendship formatted Canals as a Thomist. Another personality which contributed to his formation was Jaime Bofill Bofill, also Orlandis’ disciple and his successor as leader of the emergent so-called escuela tomista de Barcelona. It was Canals who took over from Bofill in the mid-1960s; he headed the informal group for the next 40 years and became a master for its later representatives, José María Petit, José María Alsina, Antonio Prevosti, Margarita Mauri, Ignacio Guiu, José María Romero, Francisca Tomar, Misericordia Anglés, Eudaldo Forment and others.

Canals’ contribution to philosophy is spanned in-between metaphysics, ontology and epistemology, its three major threads being "la metafísica del conocimiento, la metafísica del ser y la metafísica de la persona"; the key area of interest was the theory of cognition. However, his opus is generally credited for providing a multi-faceted synthesis of Thomism, perhaps the latest one available globally to date. Most original Canals’ input to understanding of Thomism is a theory of "thinking realism", a concept which examines relation between a human and transcendency by discussing integrity of the act of being and the act of knowing, the latter manifestive and locutionary. It is combined with and supported by the focus on praecognita, cognitive properties of a human; substantialist approach to a person is one more characteristic feature of Canals’ discourse, combined with his general vision of "humanismo teocéntrico". Another thread marking Canals’ innovative approach to Thomism is certain detachment of analysis from the traditional scholastic and neo-scholastic orthodoxy and defining the concept in discourse with thought grounded in Kantian and Hegelian approach. Far from seeking common ground, Canals seeks to demonstrate robustness of Aquinas’ opus as capable of confronting and overcoming perceived limitations of modern thought.

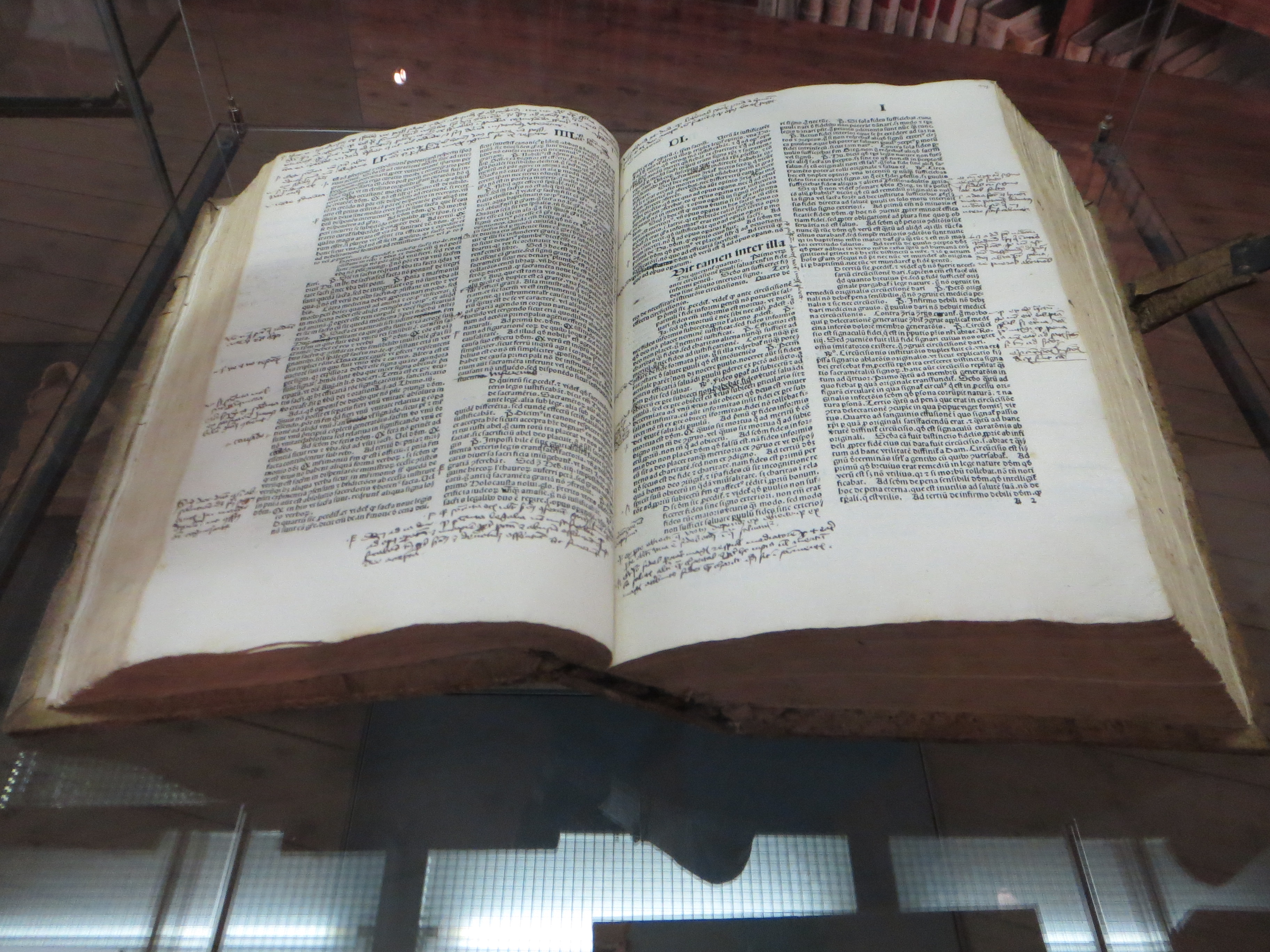
Summa Theologica

Canals’ philosophical treaty which stands out and should be listed first is definitely his Sobre la esencia del conocimiento (1987), a massive study discussing epistemology from the Thomist perspective, described by some as "the book which makes history". A more synthetic work on Aquinas, gathering most of earlier threads and summarized by the end of Canals’ life, is Tomás de Aquino. Un pensamiento siempre actual y renovador (2004). Two earlier works, more compact and the latter partly repetitive, are Para una fundamentación de la metafísica (1967) and Cuestiones de fundamentación (1981), apart from minor works scattered across specialized reviews. Canals’ Thomist opus is complete with an anthology he edited, Sant Tomàs d’Aquino. Antología metafísica (1991), to which he added two other anthologies of contemporary (1974) and medieval (1975) philosophical texts, both reprinted a few times throughout the following two decades. The work which enjoyed most popularity, however, is tailored as a textbook for philosophy students; Historia de la filosofía medieval (1976) was re-issued 4 times until the early 1990s.

== Theologian ==
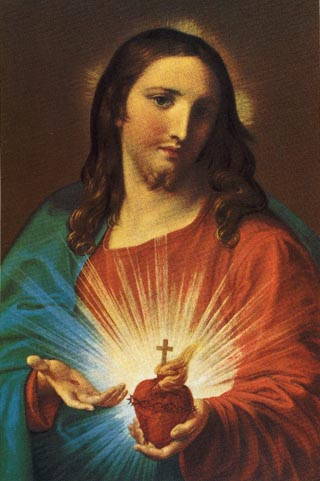
Sacred Heart by Batoni

Since his encounter with father Orlandis Canals’ interest was divided mostly between philosophy and theology. He perceived the latter not as a speculative exercise but as a discursive science, subject to usual rational verification procedures yet remaining in the service of Roman Catholic faith. His opus falls largely into two branches, dogmatic theology and historical theology. Since the late 1960s he was increasingly recognized as authority by a number of Catholic institutions and organizations. Among the Spanish Traditionalist intellectuals he was perhaps the one least skeptical about Vaticanum II and afterwards remained firmly within the Vatican-defined orthodoxy. This was certified by the 1998 nomination to St. Thomas’ Academy and the 2002 honor of commander of Ordo Sancti Gregorii Magni, both conferred upon him by John Paul II; Canals was personally appreciated by the Pope and in his writings explored a number of concepts coined earlier by Karol Wojtyła.

In terms of doctrine Canals’ efforts were multifold. Chronologically the first dogma he tackled and examined throughout most of his life was this of the Sacred Heart of Jesus; however, he then focused on a number of Mariologist and Christologist dogmas. Two threads which emerged as "más característicos" of his study are theology of history and Josephology. The former, anchored in the vision of earthly Rule of Christ as the ultimate goal, is somewhat opposed to earlier millenarian concepts yet advances their modified version, dubbed by scholars "milenarismo mitigado" or "milenarismo político". Josephological studies are related to the concept of "spiritual infancy", reportedly represented by St. Joseph, his position of a role model and its implications for apostolate of the lay; other associated threads are those referring to marital relations, virginity and St. Joseph's position in the hypostatic order. In terms of history of theology Canals dedicated most his attention to Aquinas and the early Medieval thought. Tracing evolution of the doctrine from the 4th to the 8th century he acknowledges political and socio-cultural background, yet he evades reductionism and claims that the process of formulating the Catholic doctrine was powered mostly by fidelity to key dogmas.

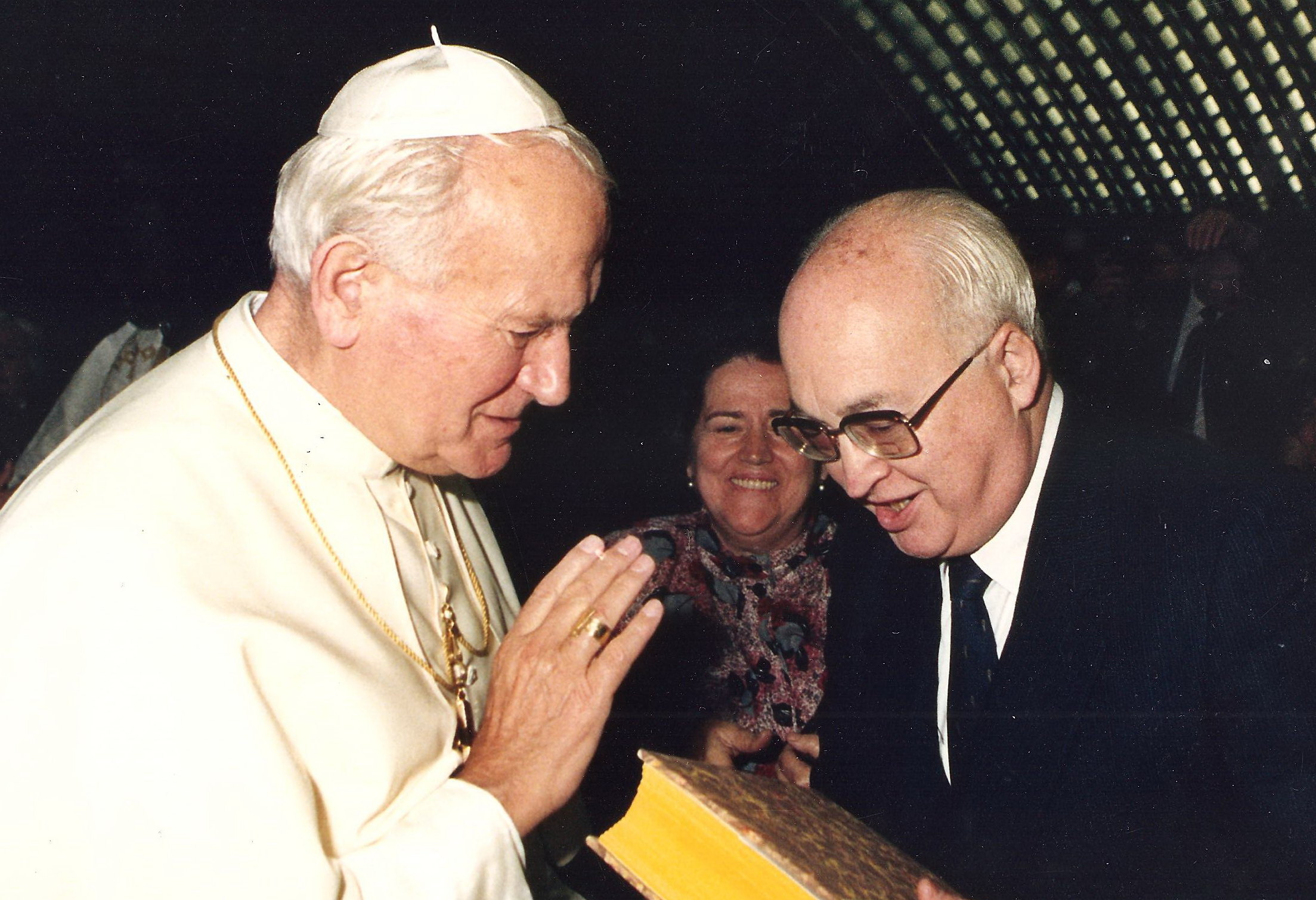
Canals and John Paul II, 1989

Of Canals’ written theological output the Josephologist thread is treated most extensively; it was dedicated two books, a lengthy San José, Patriarca del Pueblo de Dios (1982) and an anthology of texts on St. Joseph, titled San José en la fe de la Iglesia (2007). Mundo histórico y Reino de Dios (2006) is a lecture in theology of history, while Los siete primeros concilios. La formulación de la ortodoxia católica (2003) discusses evolution of the early Catholic doctrine. The work which falls into none of the fields discussed earlier is En torno al diálogo católico-protestante (1966); written in course of Vaticanum II it advanced a somewhat competitive approach towards ecumenism and claimed that stress on components unifying Christian faiths comes at a cost of de-emphasizing the core message. Last but not least, for more than half a century Canals contributed to a number of Catholic reviews, mostly Cristiandad, and remained in its editorial board.

== Historian ==
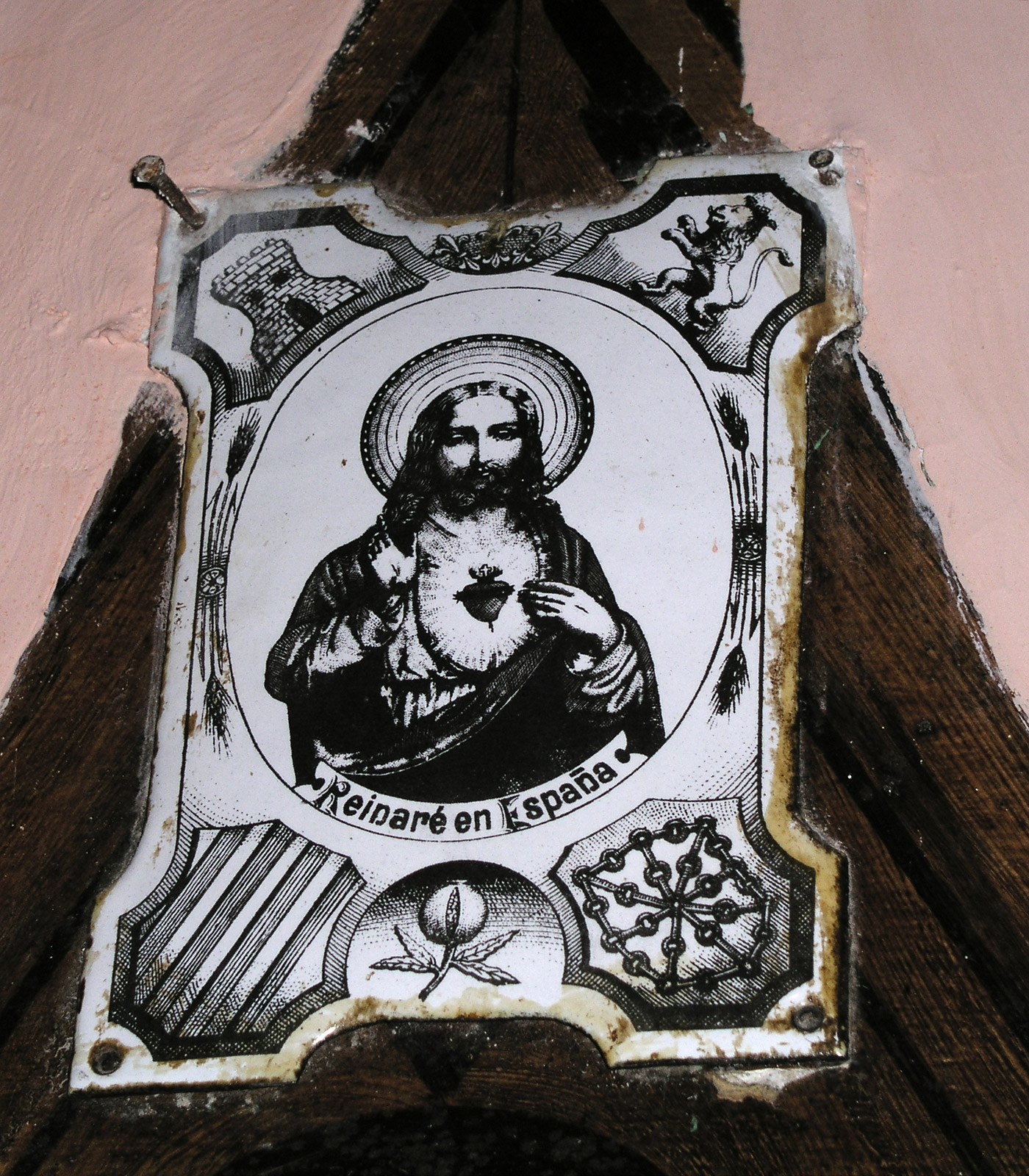
I will rule over Spain

Historiography formed a secondary yet visible section of Canals’ writings. He remained almost exclusively a historian of ideas. In terms of timeframe, he tended to focus on the late modern period, in terms of geography he tended to focus on Catalonia, Spain and the Hispanic realm, and in terms of key threads he tended to focus on confrontation between traditional structures and the challenges of Enlightenment, Absolutism, Revolution, Romanticism and Liberalism. Armed with his general theological vision of history, Canals discusses mounting feeling of perceived discontinuity between the past and the present, mostly against the background of 18th-19th century Romance-speaking Europe, and the efforts to bridge the gap, leading to birth of Traditionalism. Its key opponent is defined as Liberal Catholicism, examined at length as it developed and adopted itself to changing political circumstances; confrontation of the two is presented mostly in the Spanish setting though at times reaching also to a broader European milieu, e.g. in case of France covering also royalism of the Restoration, monarchist legitimism or Ultramontanism of the later era.

Contrary to the currently prevailing view, Canals advances a thesis that the modern Catalan identity was forged as part of traditional Christian response to competitive universalist concepts gaining ground since the late 17th century and usually imported from the other side of the Pyrenees. Starting with the anti-Borbonic war of 1705-1714 - the theory goes - the Catalan political self was being built; the process gained pace and in fact was most dramatically expressed in a series of 7 counter-revolutionary wars, fought by the Catalans between 1794 and 1876: Guerra Gran, the War of Independence, Guerra Realista, Guerra de los Agraviados, the First Carlist War, Guerra dels Matiners and the Third Carlist War. Within the perspective offered, advances of the bourgeoisie-driven Liberalism gave rise to a new concept of Catalanism, which in fact is de-construction rather than re-construction of a Catalan self. Being a local copy of European nationalisms, it reportedly discards constitutive features of Catalan identity and leads to "Cataluña sin alma y sin vida".

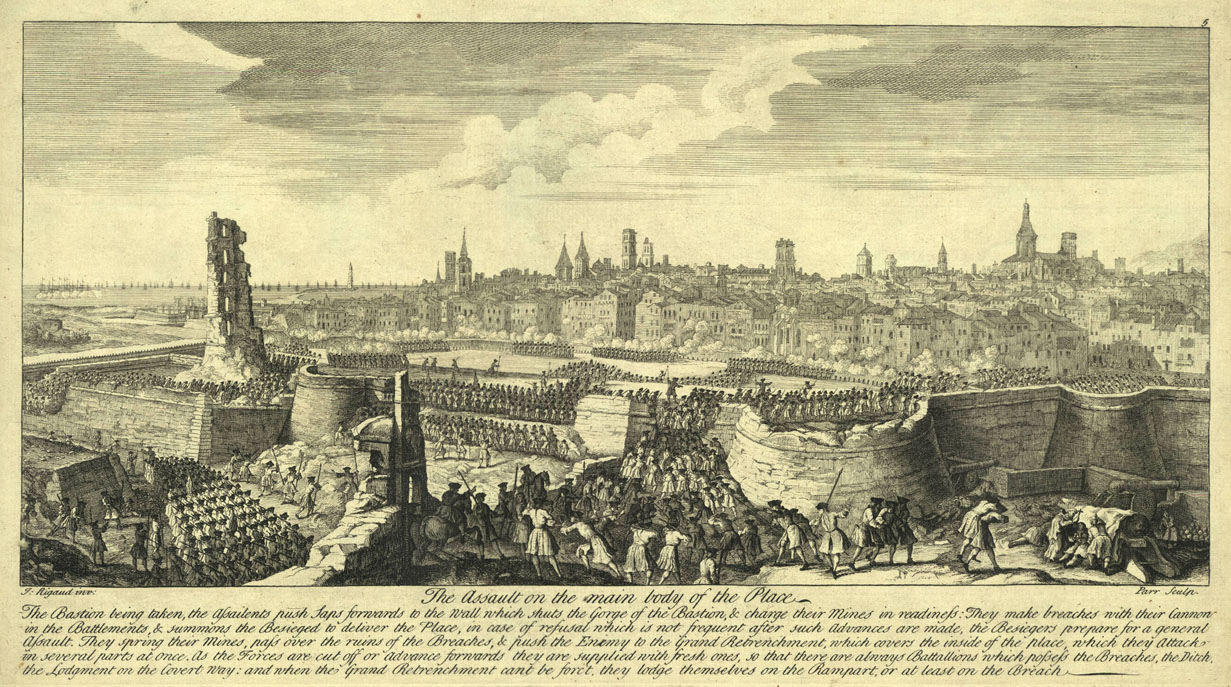
Barcelona, September 11, 1714

Canals’ historiographic writings are mostly essays, scattered across various periodicals, usually Cristiandad, and later gathered together in compact volumes. The first major work published was his scaled down PhD thesis Cristianismo y revolución: los orígenes románticos del cristianismo de izquierdas (1957); the work was centred on Felicite de Lammenais, considered one of the founding fathers of Liberal Catholicism. Almost 40 years later Canals published La tradición catalana en el siglo XVIII: ante el absolutismo y la Ilustración (1995), the work discussing birth of Catalan Traditionalism as response to new ideas imported from France. A minor Miscelánea (1997) was followed by Catalanismo y tradición catalana (2006), a booklet which contained a set of 8 essays, focused on history of Catalan identity. Some volumes of the currently issued Obras Completas series are supposed to re-publish historiographic Canals’ writings.

== Between Traditionalism and Carlism ==
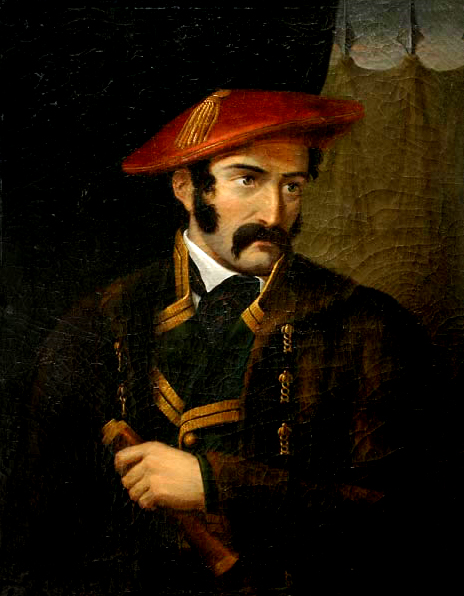
Zumalacarregui

Canals did not engage openly in politics, be it in terms of joining any party or competing for posts of power. He is hardly known for speaking on issues related to ongoing politics; the exception was signing a letter of 61 intellectuals, who in 1978 voiced against the constitution draft. They noted that by ignoring God and elevating the people to ultimate authority, capable of telling the good from the evil, the document advanced an unacceptable "secular totalitarianism". Canals’ Política española: pasado y futuro (1977) is a collection of essays on general "filosofía política"; they discuss a number of political concepts yet fall short of advocating specific solutions.

Throughout most of his life Canals remained involved in cultural initiatives flavored with Traditionalism, often though not exclusively of the Carlist breed. The two which stand out are his contributions to Verbo, a review issued since the 1950s, and activity in Junta de Gobierno of Centro de Estudios Zumalacárregui. A think-tank set up by offshoots from Comunión Tradicionalista, in the 1960s the Center staged Congresos de Estudios Tradicionalistas, attended by Canals; he contributed also to its other initiatives, e.g. Jornadas Catalanes. Working closely with pundits engaged in Carlist militancy, Canals contributed to emphasizing the Traditionalist core of Carlism; they were very much aimed at confronting Progressist designs to re-formulate Carlist outlook. ¿Qué es el carlismo?, a 1971 booklet re-capturing the Carlist orthodoxy, listed Canals among supreme theorists.

Canals did not explicitly identify himself as a Carlist, yet his writings implicitly suggest he embraced a Carlist identity. Though he admitted that historically Traditionalism and Carlism amalgamated as late as in the 1860s, he claimed also that since then in real life the Traditionalist principles can be fully embodied only in Carlism, the sole genuine heir of Cristiandad and Las Españas and the guardian of Spanish moral and social order. Canals admitted a theoretical possibility of separate Traditionalist and Carlist identities, yet he considered such an option absurd, comparable to being an Orangist Roman Catholic Irishman or a Protestant Jacobite. To him, Traditionalism was the essence and Carlism was the existence; the former is the order of thought, "el orden del saber especulativo-práctico", while the latter is its practical embodiment.

Carlist standard

Canals is at times referred to as "Carlist thinker/philosopher", "Catalan Carlist" or "outstanding/distinguished Carlist"; some count him among 4 contemporary "masters of Carlist thought" or "most important intellectuals of two centuries of Carlism" and claim that he "excelled as Carlist". However, they note also that appreciative of legitimist thread, Canals has never been a partisan of any specific claimant and certainly stayed clear of Javierista-dominated Comunión Tradicionalista. More cautious scholars prefer to note him as involved in initiatives "linked to Carlist legitimism", some settle for a general "Catholic conservative counter-revolutionary" and most opt for "Traditionalist intellectual". By opponents he was considered a "Catholic integrist" and "ultra-conservative". At times he is named a "Francoist" and "reactionary". Some apply the term "ultraderechista" as an honor.
