= Marcial Solana González-Camino =

Spanish scholar, writer and politician (1880–1958)

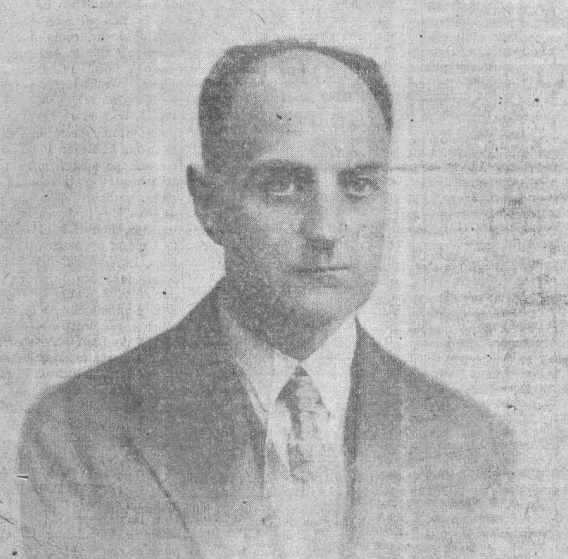
- Born: Marcial Solana González-Camino; 1880; Santander, Spain
- Died: 1958 (aged 77–78); Santander, Spain
- Occupation: Landowner
- Known for: Philosopher, political theorist
- Political party: Carlism

Marcial Augusto Justino Solana González-Camino (1880–1958) was a Spanish scholar, writer and politician. In science he is best known as historian of philosophy and author of a monumental work on 16th century Spanish thinkers, though he contributed also to history, theory of law and theology. In politics he is recognized chiefly as a Traditionalist theorist of state, apart from his rather modest militancy within Integrism and Carlism. Throughout all his life he was also active in various lay Catholic organizations.

== Family and youth ==
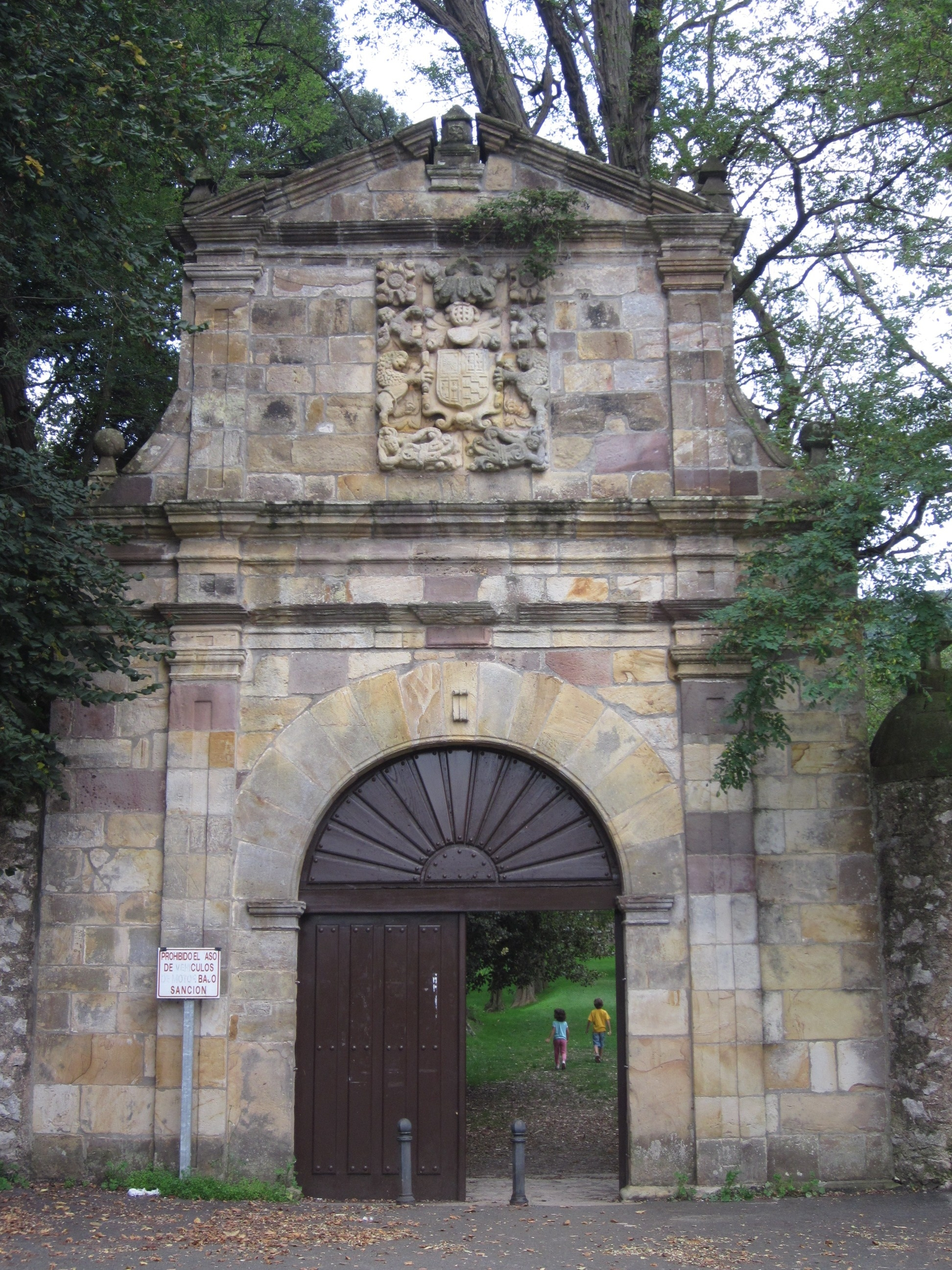
Rosequillo entry gate

The Solana family was first recorded in the 13th century as related to Liaño, a village currently situated on the outskirts of Santander; members of the local hidalguia, its representatives were later many times noted as civil and religious servants in the region. In the mid-18th the Solanas held already a mayorazgo in the Liaño quarter of Socabarga; the first to settle in the nearby Villaescusa was Marcial's great-grandfather, Roque de Solana Río. In the early 19th century he already held a number of estates in the province and grew to the Cortes deputy in the 1810s. His son, Pedro Solana Collado (1801-1868), served as infantry colonel and sided with the Carlists during the First Carlist War; exiled, in the 1840s he returned following the amnesty, but engaged in Carlist conspiracy of 1855. Married in 1846, he built a house on the Rosequillo estate in La Concha de Villaescusa. His son and Marcial's father, Marcial Rufo Solana González-Camino (1847-1885), multiplied the family wealth trading flour in Cuba; upon return to Spain in 1879 he married a cousin, Elvira Irene González-Camino de Velasco (1861-1939), herself descendant to a well-to-do Cantabrian bourgeoisie family.

Though Marcial Rufo and Irene held a number of estates, they lived mostly at calle Calderon 5 in Santander. They had only two children, Marcial's sister born posthumously; the siblings were raised in a fervently Catholic ambience. In 1890 Marcial took entry exams to Instituto de Segunda Ensañanza of Santander, but for unclear reasons he pursued curriculum with the Jesuits in Orduña; he obtained bachillerato, confirmed by Instituto de Bilbao, in 1896. The same year he entered the Jesuit Deusto institute; in 1899 he graduated sobresaliente in Filosofia y Letras and in 1902, also sobresaliente, in law. Spared military service he commenced doctoral research in Madrid. In 1904 Solana obtained PhD laurels – sobresaliente – in law, and in 1906 he paired it – always sobresaliente – with the one in philosophy, also in Madrid.

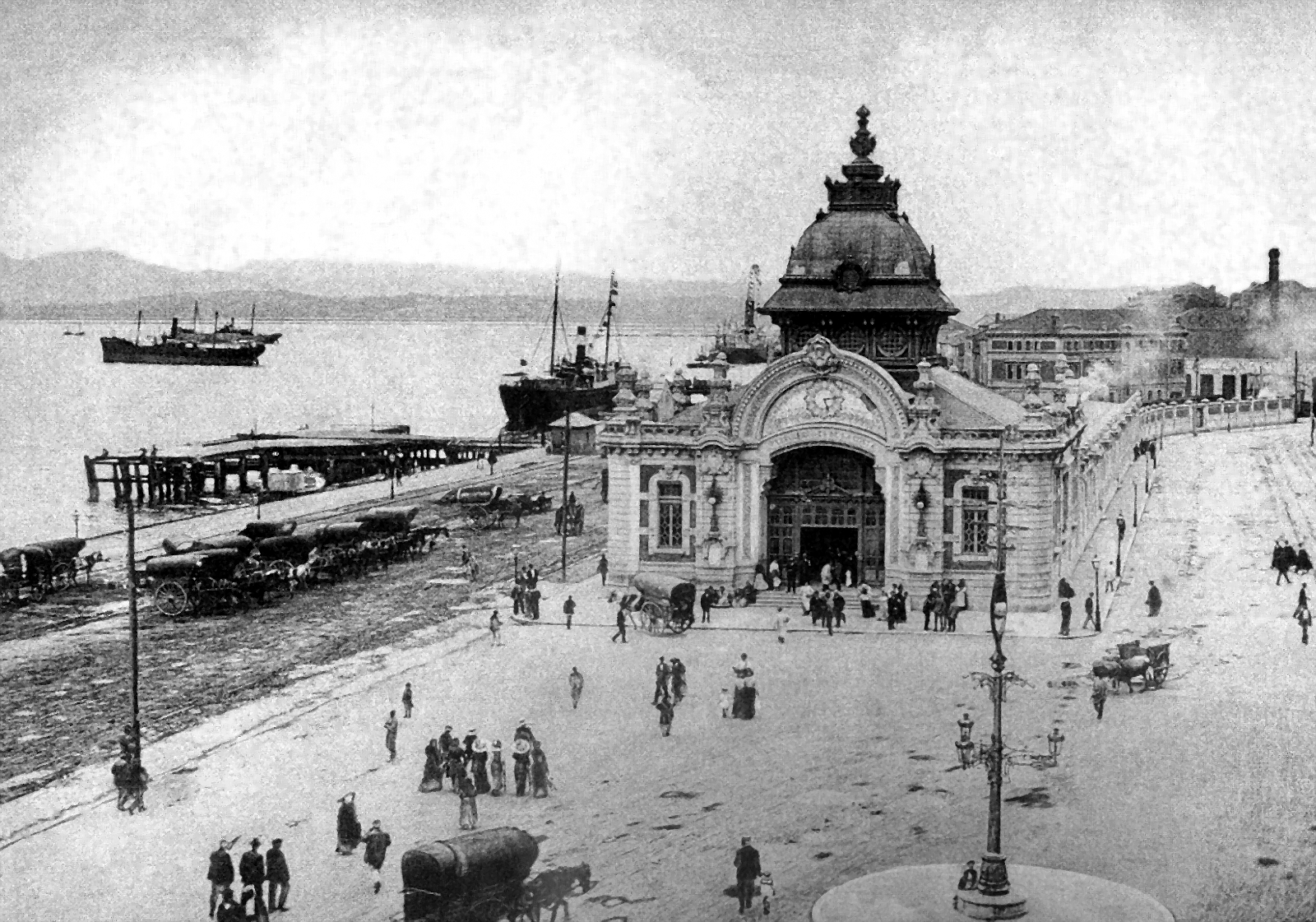
Santander, around 1907

Though scholar in law, Solana did not enter Colegio de Abogados and did not practice, all the same some press titles referred to him as "ilustrado abogado". He commenced professional career neither. A wealthy man who inherited a number of plots, 56 in the Santander province alone, he lived off the land rent. Owner of a number of mansions dubbed palacios, the key ones in Esles, Socabarga and Villaescusa, Solana lived mostly in Santander, in the last decades of his life spending summers in his favorite estate, Granja Santa María in Vizcaínos de la Sierra, in the Burgos province. He has never married and had no children. His biographer claims Solana led an austere life, spending money on books, travelling and investments in his rural economy, though in the 1920s he was noted as one of few cars owners in the Santander province. Solana's best known relative was his maternal cousin, José Luis Zamanillo, a Carlist and Francoist politician known mostly in the 1960s and 1970s.

== Integrist ==
There were many Carlist antecedents in Solana's family; his grandfather served in the legitimist troops during the First Carlist War, while his maternal grand-uncle Fernando Fernández de Velasco was a Carlist deputy in the 1860s and soldier during the Third Carlist War. In the late 1880s both sided with the secessionist Integrist branch, joined by Marcial's maternal uncle, José Zamanillo Monreal, who in the 1890s became the Integrist leader in Cantabria. In absence of his late father, it was Velasco and Zamanillo who formatted Marcial along the Integrist pattern. Initially he did not engage in politics and since academic years got very active in Catholic initiatives; also following return from Madrid to Santander Solana continued on the same path. He entered Adoración Nocturna, in 1907 co-founded Centro Católico Electoral, was Secretario in Juntas de Acción Católica y Defensa Social, presided over Sindicato Católico Agrario, engaged in 1908 Jubileo Sacerdotal of Pío X and joined ACNDP. In 1908 he entered Federación Agrícola Montañesa.

In 1908 Solana was first noted as speaking in public. In 1909 he became concejal of the Villaescusa ayuntamiento and in 1910 was elected alcalde of La Concha, noted for introducing fines for offences to religion and morality. Active in the Integrist Centro Católico Montañés, also in 1910 he ran as its representative and a Catholic candidate to the Cortes, defining his political objective as "la instauración del reinado de Cristo en todos los órdenes de la vida nacional". Having lost Solana remained active as local Integrist speaker. In the successive 1914 elections he initially agreed to stand as a Catholic candidate, but there is no information on him actually running. In 1916 he competed as a joint Catholic Integrist-Carlist candidate supported also by the Mauristas and the Conservatives and emerged triumphant. In his 2-year-term Solana was noted only for budget amendments favoring the Church. There is no information on him standing in the 1918 campaign, though in the 1919 one he was initially reported as running for the lower and upper chamber. In 1920 he was noted as taking part in electoral meeting with no information related to the 1923 elections.

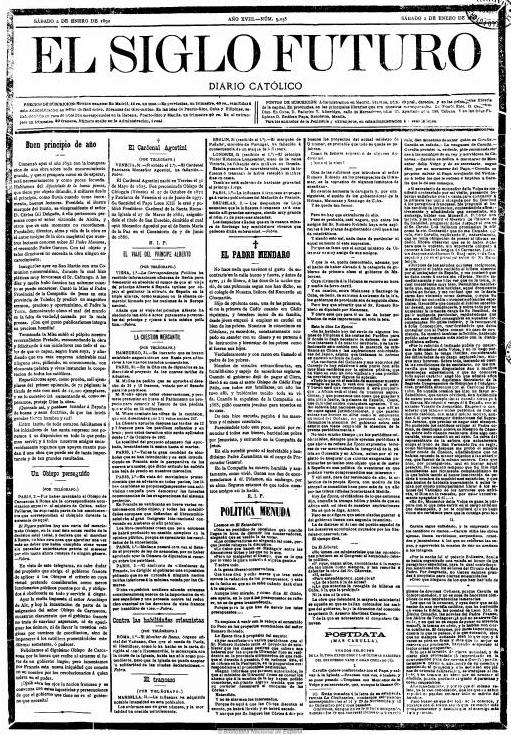
El Siglo Futuro

In the late 1910s Solana emerged among nationwide Integrist activists, in the 1920s starting to publish front-page pieces in key Integrist paper, El Siglo Futuro. Locally he was member of the Santander Junta Provincial and president of the municipal Junta, heading local party sessions and appearing at public gatherings alike; in the early 1920s he commenced another string as mayor of Villaescusa. When Primo de Rivera's coup brought political life to a standstill Solana withdrew into scientific work, in public restraining himself to Catholic activities. Nominated caballero of the Malta Order, in the mid-1920s he contributed to Asamblea Eucarística in Burgos, by the end of the decade engaging in Acción Católica. Attending its first Congreso Nacional of 1929, in 1929-1930 Solana spoke at different AC conferences nationwide. Cardenal Segura suggested his entry into Academia Pontífica de Ciencias, the plan which has never materialized.

== Carlist ==
Carlist standard

Solana maintained correct relations with the Carlists and in Santanderine institutions went with them well, though noted also that "nuestra bandera es muy anterior y muy superior". Upon the 1931 declaration of the Republic he co-led the Integrist fraction advocating integration with Carlism and presided over the joint Integrist-Jaimist meeting in Cantabria, which finalized return to the "vieja mansión" of orthodox Carlism. Within the united Comunión Tradicionalista he initially did not land major posts, noted rather for activity as speaker across Spain, giving erudite lectures about Traditionalism though rather seldom noted in the press as a key speaker.

In the mid-1930s Solana became one of key Carlist theorists, referred to as "maestro del tradicionalismo". In 1934 the claimant nominated him to Consejo de Cultura, guardians of the orthodoxy; some scholars list him among "cupola tradicionalista". In 1934 Solana served as legal expert to his king. In three letters he addressed the succession issue, responding to Alfonso Carlos’ attempt to sort out the question of what happens after his death; Solana's opinion was that the claimant was not free to appoint his successor and that an assembly of representatives had to participate in the process, the advice which might have heavily contributed to the regentialist solution eventually adopted. In terms of present-day politics Solana was among key advocates of close monarchist collaboration within Acción Española; his study on right to resistance, often referred as pre-configuration of the 1936 coup, was published in the AE review.

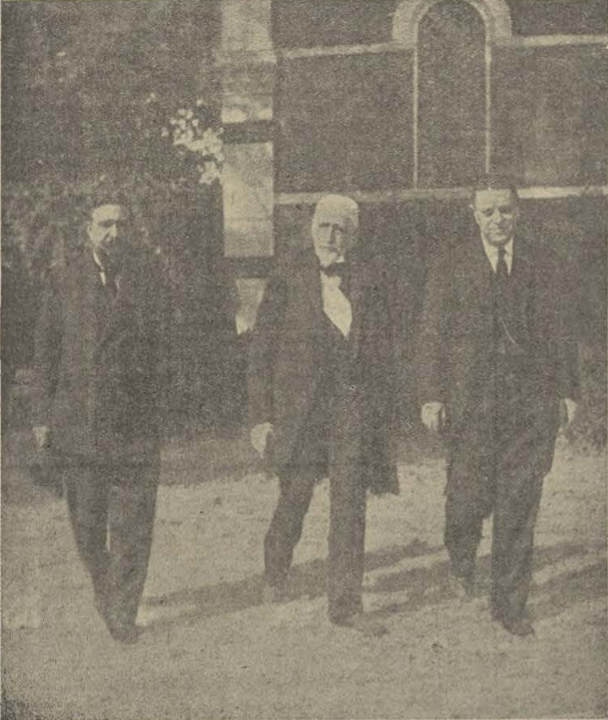
Carlist king Alfonso Carlos I (middle), 1931

It is not clear whether Solana was aware of Carlist preparations to the coup, though he was aware that he might be among first targets of revolutionary violence; on his estates he maintained two secret hideouts. In unclear circumstances in late August 1936 he crossed the French frontier but soon returned and spent 1937 in Valle de Baztan, following the Nationalist seizure of Cantabria returning to his Rosequillo estate. He is not listed as active member of the Carlist executive, yet it is known he sided with Fal against the Unification Decree. Some scholars suspect he was instrumental in drafting the 1939 memorandum to Franco, which demanded restoration of Traditionalist monarchy; in the early 1940s he was fined as engaged in technically illegal Comunión structures.

Solana is hardly mentioned as busy in day-to-day party activity in the 1940s, though some scholars claim that as theorist he was absolutely vital for maintaining Carlist spiritual identity as opposed to the Francoist amalgamation, including drafting another memorandum, dated 1945. He might have attended some meetings of Junta Nacional and he surely attended the 1947 gathering of regional jefes, the first one after 1937. In 1951 he managed to publish El tradicionalismo político español y la ciencia hispana, the study completed in 1938; until today it is considered one of the most in-depth lectures of Traditionalism and perhaps the most important Solana's contribution to both Traditionalism and Carlism. It also marked the climax of his engagement: in the 1950s Solana abandoned militancy and focused on scientific and Catholic duties.

== Philosopher ==
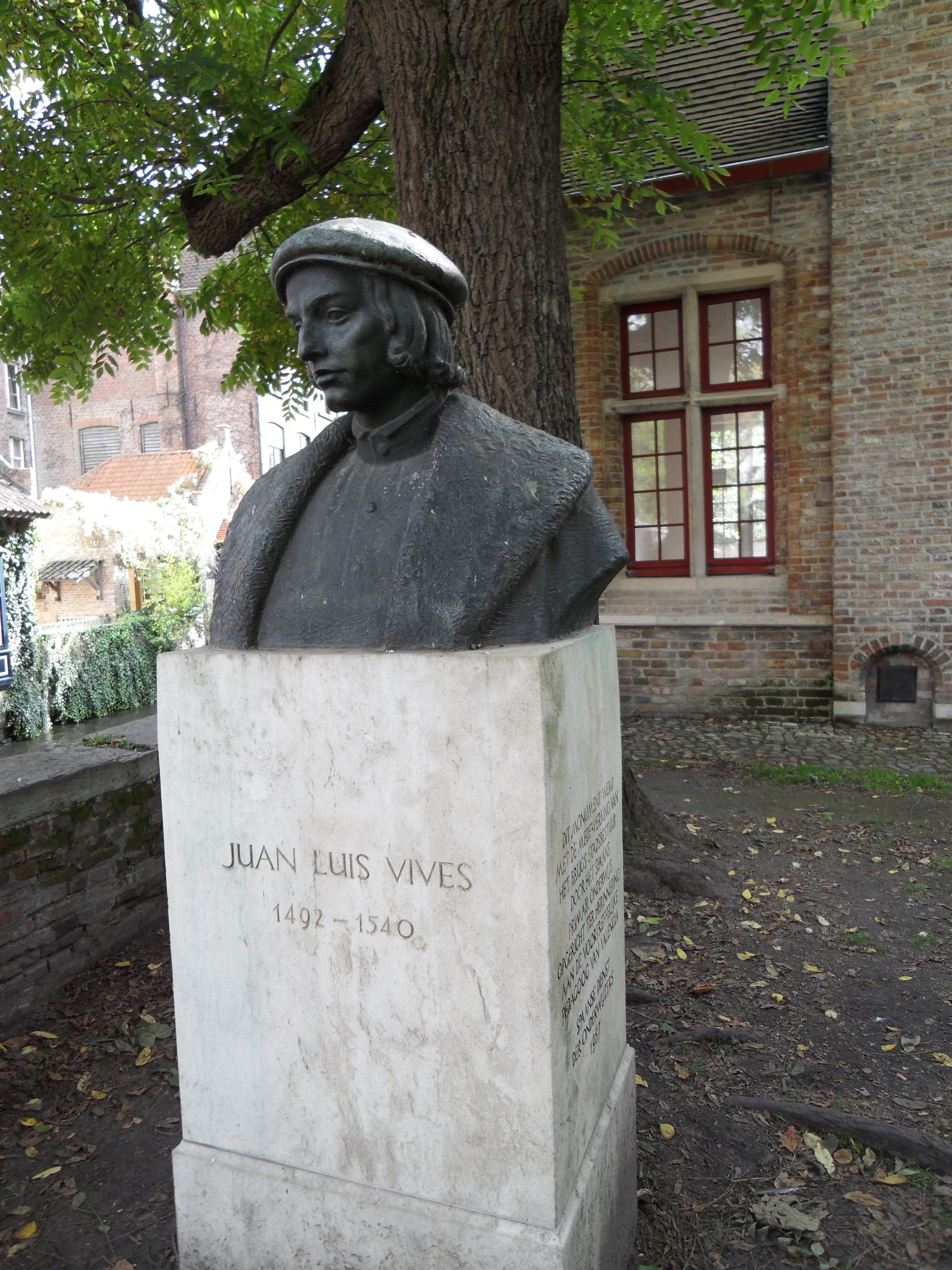
Bust of Juan Vivès, Flanders

Solana dedicated most of his scholarly attention to philosophy and though he fathered other attempts mostly in theology, he excelled as historian. The question underlying most of his efforts is about existence of filosofía española, a category bearing features specific to the Spanish realm. His answer was to the affirmative. It was founded on assertion that a specifically Spanish philosophical approach was formulated in the 16th century, deemed Siglo de Oro, and owing its constituting features to Juan Luis Vives, Francisco de Vitoria, Francisco Suárez, Domingo de Soto and Domingo Báñez. It comprised a multitude of trends, yet its backbone was the late scholastic school spanned between vivismo and suarismo; it gave rise to a number of currents which were to power the Spanish philosophy later on, including logic, natural law, penal law, international law, ontology and their synthesis.

Solana approached the Golden Age heritage very much in the menendezpelayista manner, as multifold manifestations of orthodoxy confronting heterodoxy up to the 19th century, embodied last in works of Luis de Lossada, Jaime Balmes and Ceferino González. He viewed the essence of original Spanish philosophy in unity with theology, fidelity to Catholic values and synthetic, holistic approach; the Spanish self was expressed in unity with God. He preferred metaphysics and epistemology to other branches; the names quoted in his works most often are those of Aquinas and Menendez Pelayo. On the opposite end were the Liberal thinkers, even the iconic ones, and his references to Unamuno or Ortega y Gasset are extremely rare; similarly he displayed scarce interest in foreign philosophers.

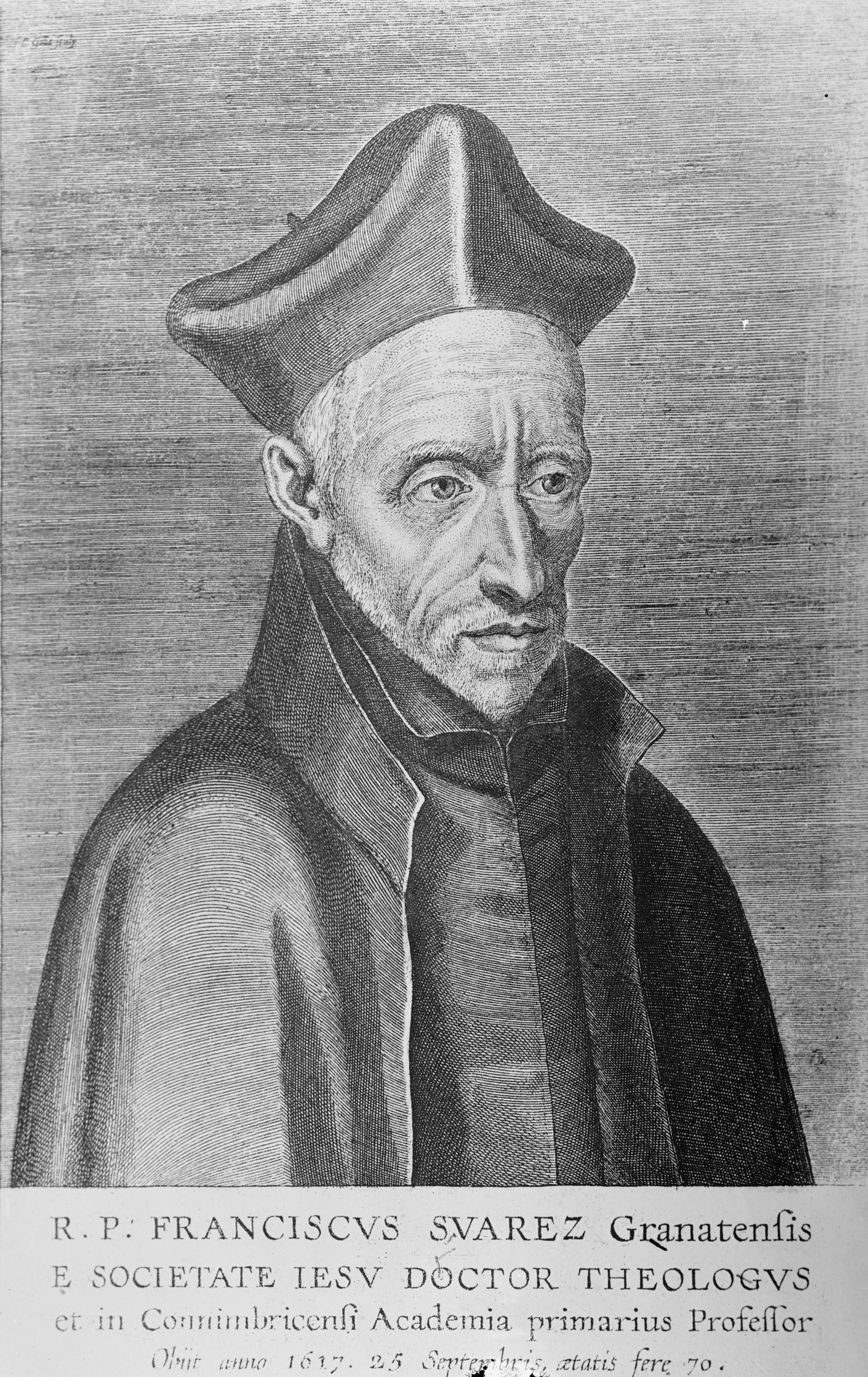
Francisco Suarez

Solana fathered some 60 works related to philosophy and theology; most are minor pieces. His opus magnum, not only in philosophy, is La Historia de la Filosofía Española. Época del Renacimiento, a massive 3-volume work written in 1928-1933 and published in 1941; a stepping stone towards it was an earlier 1927 study. A much smaller work dubbed synthesis of his thought was Fueron los españoles quienes elevaron la filosofía Escolástica a la perfección (1955). Another huge work is a massive treaty on juridical systems according to the Thomist epistemology (1925). Next to be listed are mid-size studies on scholastic thinkers, followed by smaller works on scholastics and traditionalists. Solana published some 30 smaller works on theology, summarized as falling into "corrientes tomista, ignaciana y carmelitana"; apart from historical work on Council of Trent they dealt with dogmas of Trinity, Ascension, Eucharist and sovereignty of Christ. His sole major work which falls neither to history of philosophy nor to theology is an unpublished mid-size study La libertad del hombre (1947), discussing conditions, attributes, types and objectives of human freedom to act; set in the Catholic orthodoxy, it opposed the Liberal concept of liberty and claimed that "la facultad de elegir entre el bien y el mal moral, de obrar rectamente o de pecar, es un absurdo verdadero e inaceptable'. Few works do not fit into above categories and few are translations.

== Political theorist ==
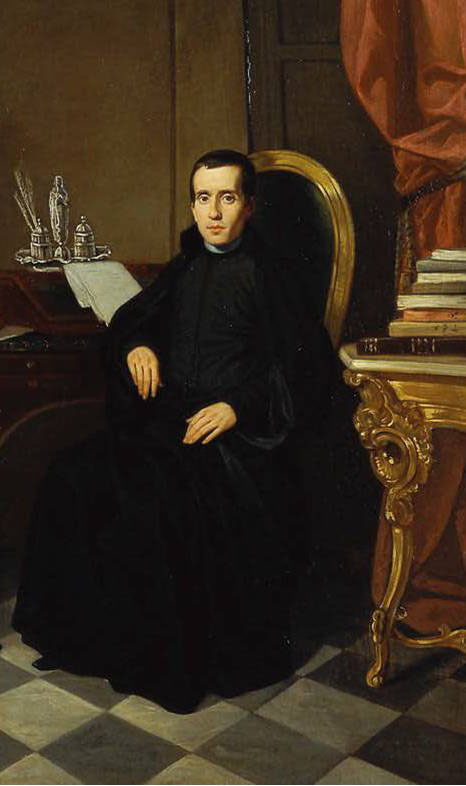
Jaime Balmes

Solana’s political theory consists of a typical Traditionalist scheme and is rooted in classic Traditionalist works. The objective of politics is "soberanía social de Dios", while the means is a regime founded on three principles. The first one is "monarquía hereditaria". The second one is "monarquía templada", i.e. royal powers moderated by collegial bodies representing the society. The third one is "descentralización y autarquía", i.e. far-reaching self-government of "intra-sovereign entities", communities organized on geographical, professional, functional or any other basis. Solana's own contribution is described as picking Traditionalist doctrine up where de Mella left off and developing it to confront totalitarian theories emerging in the 1920s and 1930s.

Solana's thought contained a strong anti-tyrannical thread, embodied already in the concept of a moderated monarchy; he also largely ignored his rival to the title of key party pundit, Víctor Pradera, whose thought endorsed dictatorial solutions. During the Republic Solana produced a treaty on the right to resist and to overthrow a despotic regime. However, an entirely new element introduced to Traditionalism was spelling out its incompatibility with totalitarian concepts. He went to great lengths denouncing Soviet, Fascist and Nazi regimes, claiming that the tyranny and deification of state which they introduce, combined with excessive nationalism, render them "irreconcilable Traditionalist enemies". Manuscript of his key theoretical work, completed in 1938, in its epilogue contained a veiled warning to Franco; it noted that Traditionalists would never support a regime based on foreign ideas, lamented "espantosa guerra civil que desangra a la Patria" and feared "que tanta sangre y tantas ruínas y tantas desgracias" might turn useless.

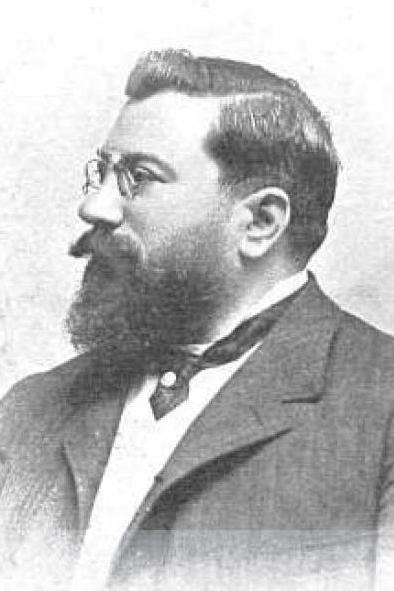
Juan Vazquez de Mella

Like some Traditionalists, Solana welcomed democracy though he understood it simply as a principle of representation. Other a bit unorthodox piece of his concepts were references to "derechos del hombre", praise of religious and educational liberties (though "rectamente entendida" and "para fínes lícitos"), notes that a human was the end and not the means and that "sociedad es para el hombre y no al revés". Some of his writings contain highly exalted passages on exceptional role of the Spaniards, comments resemblant of typical nationalist discourse and quite atypical for Traditionalism. Finally, as member of the movement which prided itself on belligerent past Solana was unusually bold in condemnation of "espiritú de violencia"; though he applied it mostly to foreign ideas, he was also careful to note that notorious "Traditionalist intransigency" had its limits. Last but not least, he considered himself a Traditionalist rather than a Carlist.

As political theorist Solana was not a prolific writer. His legacy consists of one major work, El Tradicionalismo político español y la ciencia hispana, written in 1937-1938 and published in 1951; it contains his vision of Traditionalist regime discussed against the Spanish theoretical background. The next to be listed is a mid-size treaty La resistencia a la tiranía (1933), followed by some 10 small and very small pieces. Out of these one should single out unpublished letters to Alfonso Carlos, in fact legal treaties on Carlist succession rules.

== Other writings and activities ==
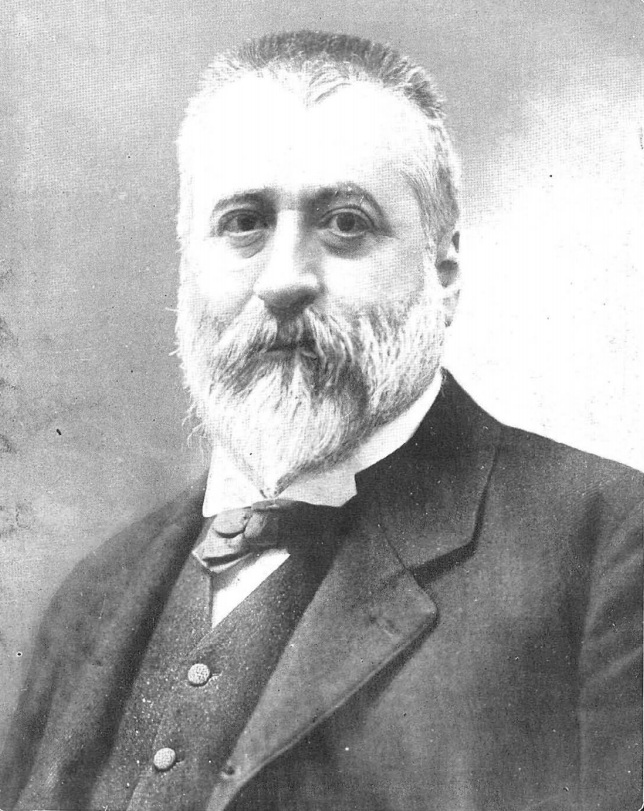
Menéndez Pelayo

Solana published some 40 works on history, mostly minor press articles he contributed from the 1910s to the 1950s. None of them is of general importance; his historiographic works which stand out are two mid-size biographical studies and two heraldic dissertations, followed by a number of smaller essays. Apart from his PhD thesis in law he did not contribute to juridical science. A separate section of his heritage are small and mid-size works related to Marcelino Menendez Pelayo, the scholar Solana considered his master.

Apart from writing, Solana contributed to Spanish culture and science as manager, administrator and activist. In the 1920s he entered Sociedad Menéndez Pelayo and started contributing to its Boletín, in 1940 becoming member of Junta Directiva. In 1934 he co-founded Centro de Estudios Montañes, nominated member of the board and jefe of sección de biografía; in 1939 he grew to vice-president and in 1940 to president. Since the 1930s he took part in works of Asociación Española para el Progreso de las Ciencias. In 1940 Solana entered Consejo Superior de Investigaciones Científicas. In 1945 he was invited to join Real Academia de Ciencias Morales y Políticas as académico correspondiente, admitted in 1951 upon his address Fueron los españoles quienes elevaron la Filosofía escolástica a la perfección. In 1951 he was nominated Cronista del Real Valle de Villaescusa. In the 1950s he became a member of numerous provincial Santander bodies: Patronato de las Cuevas Prehistóricas, provincial Consejo de Cultura, Universidad de Verano and Colegio Cántabro. Though not particularly active beyond his native Cantabria, at times Solana was recorded as delivering lectures – usually related to 16th-century Spanish philosophy – to scholarly and semi-scholarly audiences elsewhere.

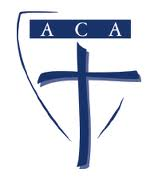
Acción Católica logotype

An entirely different thread is incessant Solana's activity in religious organizations. Already during his academic years he was engaged in Apostolado de la Oración, Congregación de la Inmaculada y San Luis Gonzaga, Academia de Literatura Práctica de San Luis Gonzaga and Congregación Universal de la Casa Santa de Loreto. In the 1920s he entered the Malta Order, contributed to various religious assemblies, excelled in ACNDP and Acción Católica; in the 1930s he was considered prospective member of Academia Pontífica de Ciencias. In the 1940s he limited himself to co-operation with the local Santander hierarchy, e.g. entering Comisión Ejecutiva for various reconstruction works; in the 1950s he acted as attorney for some real estates, held by the Santander diocese. Last but not least, he contributed financially to renovating local temples.

== Reception and legacy ==
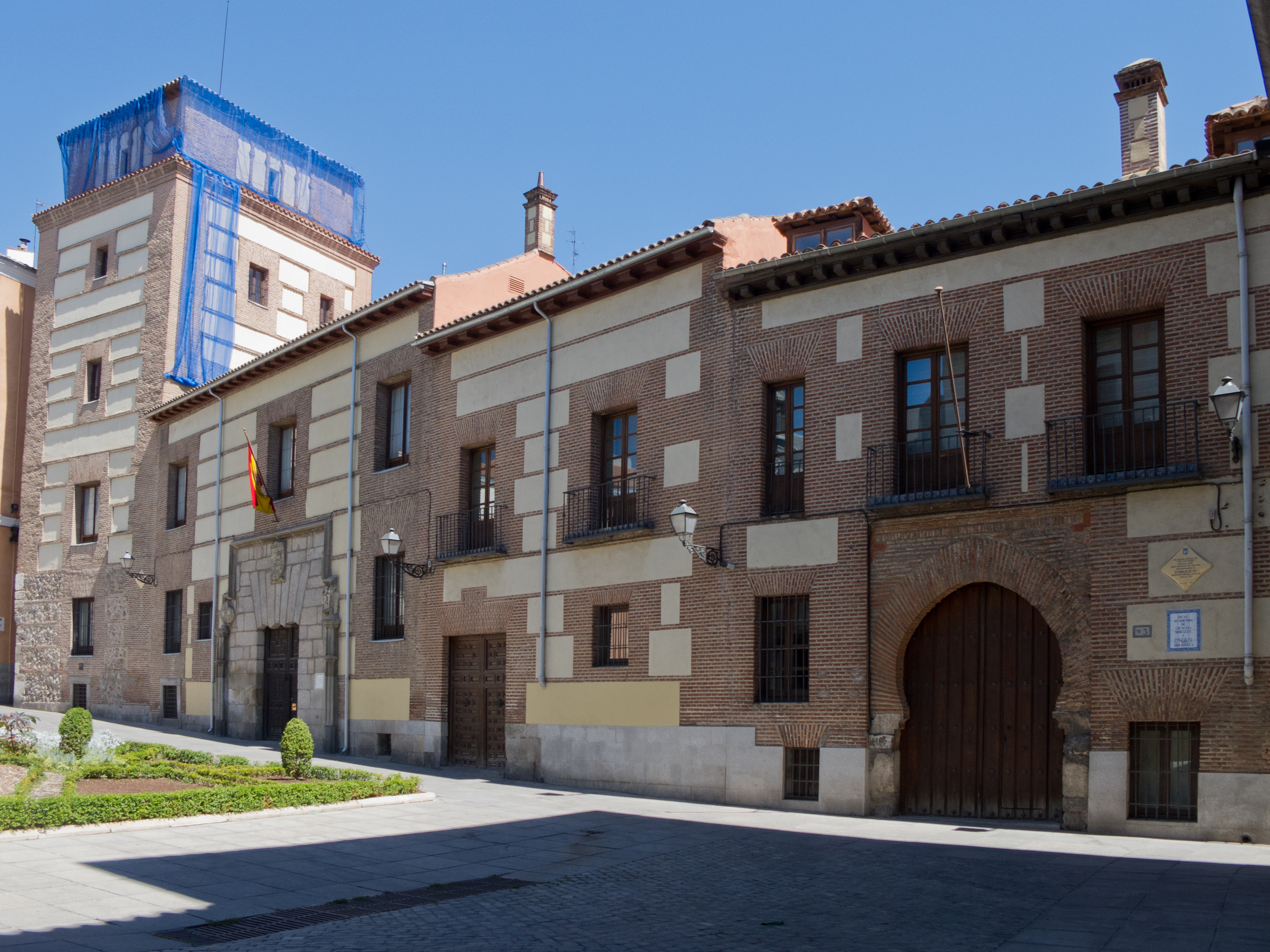
RACMYP site

Some Solana's works were rewarded in the mid-1920s; his first major honor was the 1927 Premio de Torreánaz, awarded by RACMYP. Historia de la Filosofía was commenced as a response to grand competition to complete history of Spanish philosophy, launched by Asociación Española para el Progreso de las Ciencias; the work was submitted in 1933 and declared victorious in April 1936, earning Premio Echegaray. In the scholarly realm the reception was overwhelmingly positive, though with many reservations. Solana's position was already established; formal confirmation came with the 1945 invitation to RACMYP. Starting the 1950s Solana's work on Renaissance Spanish philosophy became a must-have reference of any work dealing with history of Spanish philosophy and some works covering Siglo de Oro seem based exclusively on Solana's study, though not all credited him. According to some, no better work has been written until today.

Except necrological note Solana himself started earning brief biographical notes in the 1970s; he is acknowledged in most dictionaries and encyclopedias of Spanish philosophy, though there are few exceptions. Beyond the realm of specialists, he remained largely forgotten. He earned his first and so far the only monograph in the 2012 PhD thesis of his distant relative. The work provides an all-round discussion of Solana, yet it clearly focuses on his work as historian of philosophy. Solana's theory of state went into almost total oblivion; even within the Traditionalist and Carlist realm it is entirely overshadowed by later works of Elías de Tejada and Gambra. Founders of the Left-wing Partido Carlista dismissed it as "escrito con una mentalidad reaccionaria".

Beyond specialists in Golden Age philosophers or in Traditionalism, in historiography and political science Solana is known mostly in relation to his 1933 article, discussing views of the Siglo de Oro theorists on tyrannical rule. Referred to by both English and Spanish scholars as "lay theologian/teólogo seglar", he is noted for "legitimization of the 1936 coup". Not infrequently he is singled out among most prominent theorists who "used Aquinas" and "produced theological justifications for the violent overthrow of the Republic", "argued that violence against the Republic was justified", instigated anti-Semitism by disseminating the idea "that there was a Jewish-Masonic-Bolshevik plot” and "the political left had thus to be annihilated at all cost". The article provided rationale for counting Solana among architects of "the Spanish Holocaust" and "theorists of extermination".

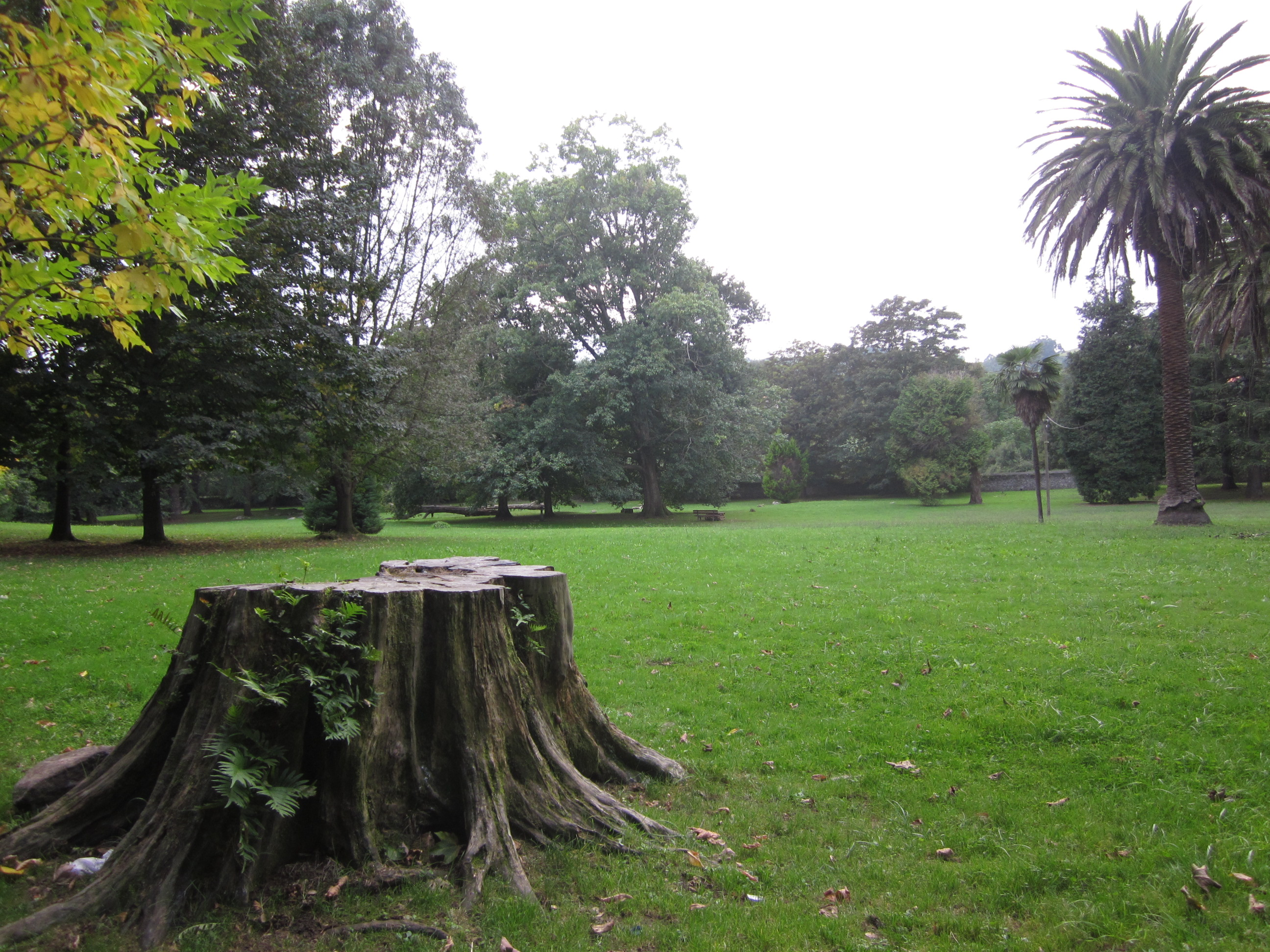
Rosequillo estate today

In his last will Solana marked funds and a large Villaescusa plot for Fundación Marcial Solana, entrusted with setting up a college in La Concha. The task has not been completed and currently the estate hosts Centro de Estudios de la Administración Regional de Cantabria. Other plots in La Concha, owned by his heirs, were expropriated in the late 1970s; it is not clear whether naming a new kindergarten and primary education establishment opened in the early 1980s, Centro de Educación Infantil y Primaria Marcial Solana, was compensation or remained otherwise related to the expropriation deal. Currently the Centro staff is militantly engaged in promoting progressive gender theories.

== See also ==
- Carlism
- Traditionalism (Spain)
- Jose Luis Zamanillo Gonzalez-Camino
- School of Salamanca
