= Ludwig Pfandl =

German writer and scholar

Ludwig Pfandl (22 September 1881, in Rosenheim – 27 June 1942, in Kaufbeuren) was a German biographer, Hispanist and Romance studies scholar.

He was a disciple of Karl Vossler and Marcelino Menéndez y Pelayo.

== Selected works ==
- Beiträge zur spanischen und provenzalischen Literatur- und Kulturgeschichte des Mittelalters [S.l.] : Gerstenberg, 1973 (Hildesheim)
- Karl II: das Ende der spanischen Machtstellung in Europa München: Georg D. W. Callwey, 1940, traducido al castellano como Carlos II, Madrid: Afrodisio Aguado, 1947.
- Spanische Kultur und Sitte des 16. und 17. Jahrhunderts: eine Einführung in die Blütezeit der spanischen Literatur und Kunst München: Josef Kösel & Friedrich Pustet, 1924, traducido como Cultura y costumbres del pueblo español de los siglos XVI y XVII: introducción al estudio del Siglo de Oro. Barcelona: Edit. Araluce, 1929; reimpreso en Madrid: Visor Libros, 1994
- Philipp II : Gemälde eines Lebens und einer Zeit Ludwig Pfandl München: Georg D. W. Callwey (Kastner & Callwey, 1938), translated into Spanish as Felipe II: bosquejo de una vida y de una época Madrid: Cultura Española, 1942.
- Geschichte der spanischen Nationalliteratur in ihrer Blütezeit Freiburg: [Herder & Co.], 1929; translated into Spanish as Historia de la Literatura nacional española en la Edad de Oro Barcelona: Lorenzo Cortina: Suc. de Juan Gili, 1933.
- Hippolyte Lucas, sein Leben und seine dramatischen Werke: ein Beitrag zur französischen Literaturgeschichte des XIX. Jahrhunderts Leipzig: A. Hoffmann: Reudnita, 1908.
- Juana la loca: madre del emperador Carlos V: su vida, su tiempo, su culpa Madrid: Espasa-Calpe, 1932.
- Sor Juana Inés de la Cruz, Primero sueño; text with introduction and notes by Karl Vossler and Ludwig Pfandl. Buenos Aires: Universidad, Facultad de Filosofía y Letras, Sección de Literatura Iberoamericana, 1953.
- Unveröffentlichte Gedichte der Brüder Argensola New York, etc. [S. l.: s.n.], 1922 (Bruyes : Imp. Sainte-Catherine).
- Die Zehnte Muse von Mexico, Juana Inés de la Cruz: Ihr Leben, Ihre Dichtung, Ihre Psyche München: [Kastner & Callwey]: Hermann Rinn, [1946].
