= Chant =

Rhythmic speaking or singing of words or sounds

Pange Lingua sung in Latin
The Latin text of Pange Lingua sung to its traditional melody, mode iii Gregorian chant

A chant (from French chanter, from Latin cantare, "to sing") is the iterative speaking or singing of words or sounds, often primarily on one or two main pitches called reciting tones. Chants may range from a simple melody involving a limited set of notes to highly complex musical structures, often including a great deal of repetition of musical subphrases, such as Great Responsories and Offertories of Gregorian chant. Chant may be considered speech, music, or a heightened or stylized form of speech. In the Late Middle Ages, some religious chant evolved into song (forming one of the roots of later Western music).

== Chant as a spiritual practice ==
Chanting (e.g., mantra, sacred text, the name of God/Spirit, etc.) is a commonly used spiritual practice. Like prayer, chanting may be a component of either personal or group practice. Diverse spiritual traditions consider chant a route to spiritual development.

Monks chanting, Drepung monastery, Tibet, 2013

Some examples include chant in African, Hawaiian (mele), Native American, Assyrian and Australian Aboriginal cultures, Gregorian chant, Vedic chant, Quran reading, Islamic Dhikr, Baháʼí chants, various Buddhist chants, various mantras, Jewish cantillation, Epicurean repetition of the Kyriai Doxai, and the chanting of psalms and prayers especially in Roman Catholic (see Gregorian chant or Taizé Community), Eastern Orthodox (see Byzantine chant or Znamenny chant, for examples), Lutheran, and Anglican churches (see Anglican Chant).

Historical or mythological examples include chant in Germanic paganism.

Chant practices vary. In the Theravada tradition, chanting is usually done in Pali, and mainly from Pāli Canon. Tibetan Buddhist chant involves throat singing, where multiple pitches are produced by each performer. The concept of chanting mantras is of particular significance in many Hindu traditions and other closely related Indian religions. India's bhakti devotional tradition centers on kirtan, which has a following in many countries and traditions such as Ananda Marga. The Hare Krishna movement is based especially on the chanting of Sanskrit Names of God in the Vaishnava tradition and is sung from the Dan tien (or lower abdomen)—the locus of power in Eastern traditions.

== See also ==
- A lo divino
- Football chant
- Fight song
- Sea shanty – Rhythmical work song sung on sailing vessels
- Skipping-rope rhyme
- Smot (chanting)
