= Dámaso Alonso =

Spanish poet, philologist, and literary critic (1898–1990)

The Most Excellent Dámaso Alonso
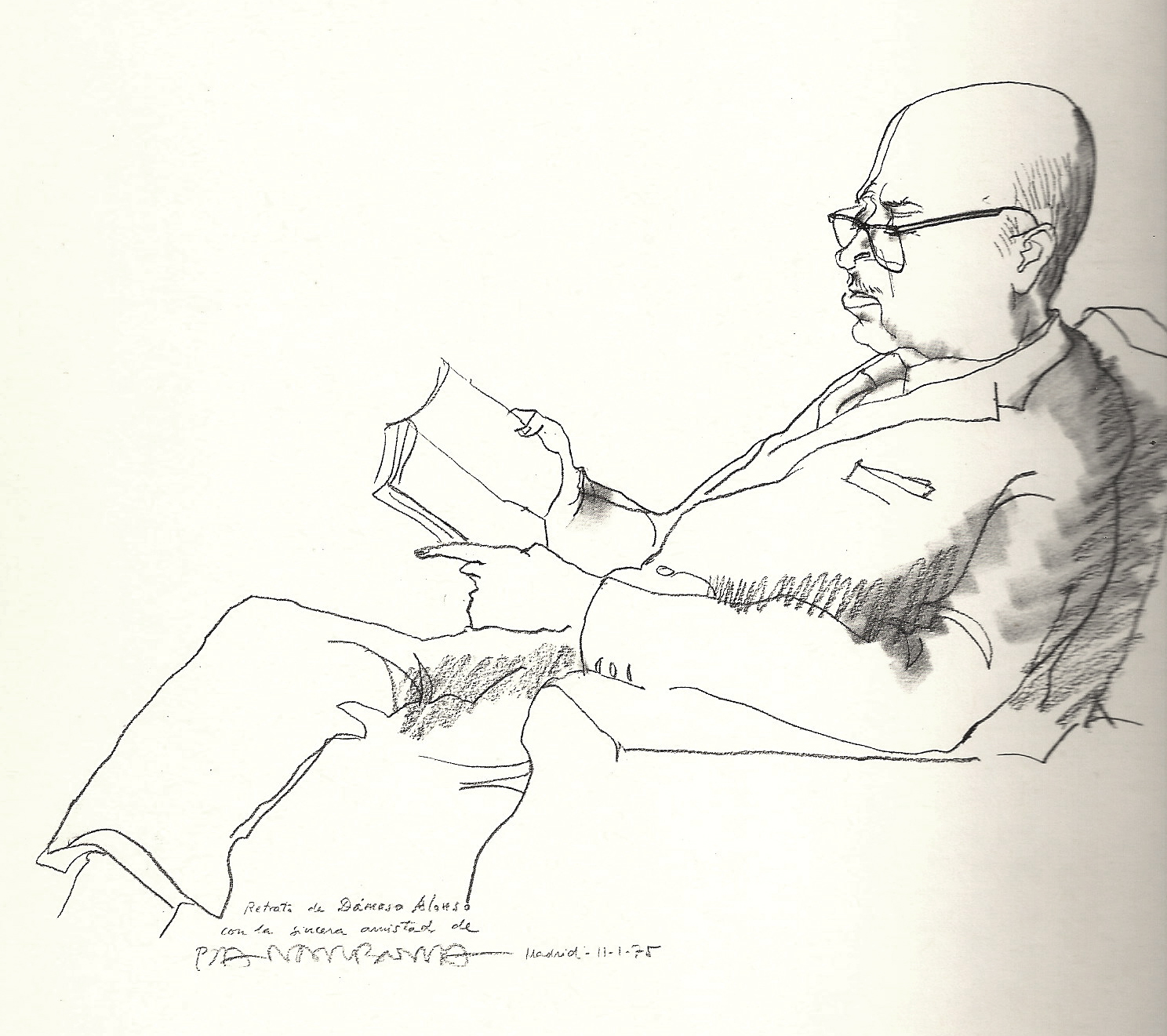
- Alonso portrait by Josep Pla-Narbona
- Born: Dámaso Alonso y Fernández de las Redondas; 22 October 1898; Madrid, Spain
- Died: 25 January 1990 (aged 91); Madrid, Spain

Seat d of the Real Academia Española
- In office 25 January 1948 – 25 January 1990
- Preceded by: Miguel Asín Palacios
- Succeeded by: Francisco Rodríguez Adrados

Director of the Real Academia Española
- In office 5 December 1968 – 26 November 1982
- Preceded by: Vicente García de Diego
- Succeeded by: Pedro Laín Entralgo

Dámaso Alonso y Fernández de las Redondas (22 October 1898 – 25 January 1990) was a Spanish poet, philologist and literary critic. Though a member of the Generation of '27, his best-known work dates from the 1940s onwards.

== Early life and education ==
Born in Madrid on 22 October 1898, Alonso studied Law, Philosophy and Literature before undertaking research at Madrid's Centro de Estudios Históricos. An enthusiastic participant in the cultural and literary life at the famous Residencia de estudiantes (which at this time counted among its residents Federico García Lorca, Luis Buñuel and Salvador Dalí, amongst others), Alonso also wrote for the literary magazines Revista de Occidente ('Western Review') and Los Cuatro Vientos ('The Four Winds').

== Academic career ==
Alonso was to become an academic of great renown: he taught Spanish language and literature at several foreign universities, including the University of Oxford and took up a chair at the University of Valencia between 1933 and 1939 before moving to the University of Madrid. He was elected to the Real Academia Española in 1945 and served as its director between 1968 and 1982, when he was named director emeritus.

== Literary career ==
Alonso's literary career can essentially be split into two convenient blocks. As a poet his early work (such as 1921's Poemas puros; Poemillas de la ciudad and 1925's El viento y el verso) is widely considered inferior to that of his fellow poets in the Generation of '27, and he himself acknowledged his limitations by referring to himself as a 'poeta de rachas' or 'part-time poet'. His mature work, however, particularly Hijos de la ira ('Children of Wrath', 1944, 2nd ed. 1946), is recognised as fundamental in the literature of the post-Civil War years.

Alonso's later poetry is also full of agnostic anguish—of a man in search of God, yet fearful of the implications were this God not to exist.

As a literary critic Alonso's impact was substantial; in particular he is credited with revolutionizing the study of Spanish Baroque poetry, particularly the work of Góngora, and his critical work was praised for its intellectual rigour. Highlights include Poesía de San Juan de la Cruz (1942), Poesía española: Ensayo de métodos y límites estilísticos (1950) and Estudios y ensayos gongorinos (1955).

== Awards and honors ==
Alonso was elected to the American Philosophical Society in 1962. In 1978, he was awarded the Premio Cervantes, the Spanish literary world's highest honour.

== See also ==
- A lo divino
