= A lo divino =

A lo divino (Spanish pronunciation: [a lo ðiˈβino]) is a Spanish phrase meaning "to the divine" or "in a sacred manner". The phrase is frequently used to describe a secular work, rewritten with a religious overtone, or a secular topic recast in religious terms using metaphors and symbolism. These types of adaptations were most popular during the 16th and 17th centuries, the Golden Age of Spanish literature.

Marcelino Menéndez y Pelayo, a Spanish literary scholar, felt the adaptations were of little note, calling them a short-lived whim of the pious. It took Dámaso Alonso's study of their influence on Garcilaso de la Vega's poetry before they were considered significant to the development of Spanish literature.

A lo divino also refers to a style of music that incorporates religious chantes.

== Famous authors ==
- Saint John of the Cross - many of his poems contained a lo divino in the title, indicating that they were taken from a secular work and changed to fit a religious interpretation.
- Sebastián de Córdoba - rewrote some of Garcilaso's secular love poems in this style.
