= Marcelino Menéndez y Pelayo =

Spanish scholar (1856–1912)

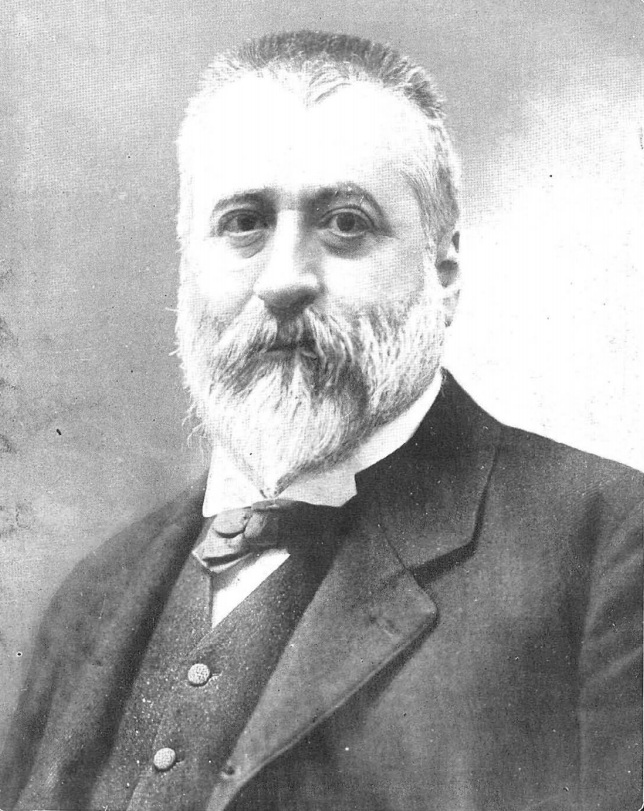
- Photograph by Kaulak
- Born: 3 November 1856; Santander, Spain
- Died: 12 May 1912 (aged 55); Santander, Spain
- Occupations: Philologist, literary critic, historian, philosopher, poet, politician

Seat l of the Real Academia Española
- In office 6 May 1881 – 12 May 1912
- Preceded by: Juan Eugenio Hartzenbusch
- Succeeded by: Jacinto Benavente (Note: Benavente was elected for the position in 1912 but never took the seat)

Marcelino Menéndez y Pelayo (Spanish pronunciation: [maɾθeˈlino meˈnendeθ i peˈlaʝo]; 3 November 1856 – 19 May 1912) was a Spanish scholar, historian and literary critic. Even though his main interest was the history of ideas, and Hispanic philology in general, he also cultivated poetry, translation and philosophy. He was nominated for the Nobel Prize in Literature five times.

== Biography ==
He was born in Santander. His brother said in his memoirs that at the age of twelve he translated Virgil without a dictionary and read the History of England by Oliver Goldsmith. At only 15, he studied literature under Manuel Milà i Fontanals at the University of Barcelona (1871–1872), then proceeded to the central University of Madrid. His academic success was unprecedented; a special law was passed by the Cortes to enable him to become a professor at 22. Three years later, in 1880, he was elected a member of the Real Academia Española, but he was already well known throughout Spain.

His first volume, Estudios críticos sobre escritores montañeses (1876), had attracted little notice at first. He then produced his scholarly investigation Horacio en España (1877), an analysis of Horace's translations in Spanish literature, with a prologue by the prominent critic Juan Valera. He became famous through his Ciencia española (1878), a collection of essays vindicating the existence of a scientific tradition in Spain. The orthodoxy of this work is even more noticeable in the Historia de los heterodoxos españoles (1880–1886), and the writer was hailed as the champion of the Ultramontane party. As the Catholic Encyclopedia (1908–10) described his work, "Every page of his writings reveals a wealth of strong common sense, clear perception, and a vein of wonderful and ever varying erudition. Thoroughly Catholic in spirit, he found his greatest delight, he declared, in devoting all his work to the glory of God and the exaltation of the name of Jesus".

His lectures (1881) on Calderón established his reputation as a literary critic. His work as an historian of Spanish literature was continued in his Historia de las ideas estéticas en España ("History of aesthetic ideas in Spain") (1883-1891), which are five volumes in which he explores, summarizes and reinterprets the existing bibliography on literary and artistic aesthetics at different times of the Spanish cultural tradition.

He undertook the publication of the works of Lope de Vega (1890-1902) in 13 volumes. Another tremendous work was his Anthology of Castilian Lyric Poets (1890-1908), again 13 volumes devoted to medieval poetry (except the last one, dedicated to Juan Boscán Almogáver). He also devoted much time to his Orígenes de la novela ("The origins of the novel"), three volumes published in 1905, 1907 and 1910, with a fourth posthumous volume where he examined the imitations that La Celestina gave rise to in the 16th century. Simultaneously, he published the Anthology of Hispano-American Poets (1893-1895), 4 volumes that are actually a History of Hispano-American poetry as he titled it when reissuing it in 1911. Although some of his judgments, mainly those related to the defense of Spanish tradition, are no longer accepted, his studies of Spanish literature (Medieval, Renaissance, and Golden Age) are still valuable.

He died at Santander. He is buried in Santander Cathedral, where his monument may still be seen.

== Disciples ==
Among his many disciples can be mentioned: Ludwig Pfandl, German Hispanist and biographer of many important Spanish historical figures; Ramón Menéndez Pidal, founder of Hispanic philology as a scientific discipline; Adolfo Bonilla y San Martín, editor of the Obras completas of Miguel de Cervantes, among other works; and José María Sánchez Muniaín, chair of Aesthetics at the Universidad Complutense de Madrid, who compiled the Antología general de Menéndez Pelayo.

== Summary of important works ==
La ciencia española (1876) is a claim of the existence of a scientific tradition in Spain. Horacio en España (1877) is an analysis of the translations of Horace in Spanish literature, according to Horace's classical dispositions. His work Historia de los heterodoxos españoles (1880–1882) is particularly famous and valued today especially where the Christian traditions of Spain are studied. From the Middle Ages to the ending of the 19th century, he breaks down the work of all the thinkers and writers persecuted by the Spanish Catholic traditions, taking the perspective of Catholicism. In his second edition he corrected some of his perspectives, but not, for example, his jests and ironies against the Krausists and the Hegelianists, especially Emilio Castelar. Historia de las ideas estéticas en España (1883–1891) is five volumes long and very up to date. They explore, summarize, and reinterpret the existing bibliography about literary esthetics and artistics in distinct eras of the Spanish cultural tradition.

Menéndez Pelayo took on three large works that would keep him occupied almost until the time of his death. One is the publication of Obras de Lope de Vega (1890–1902), written in 13 volumes; the second is the Antología de poetas líricos castellanos (1890–1908), another 13 volumes dedicated to medieval poetry, except for the last, dedicated to Juan Boscán. As well, despite its title, it includes epic poetry along with didactic poetry, changing Antología instead to Historia de la poesía castellana en la Edad Media, the title of the reprint in 1911. The third work is his study of Orígenes de la novela, three volumes published in 1905, 1907, and 1910, with a fourth, posthumous, volume in which he analyzes the imitations that gave place in the 16th century for La Celestina. He published simultaneously a four volume work called Antología de poetas hispano-americanos (1893–1895), which in reality is Historia de la poesía hispanoamerica, as it was titled in the 1911 reedit. He corrected in this edition his appreciations of Peru, after having contact with Marqués de Montealegre de Aulestia. The 1911 edition is a general study of all Hispanic-American poetry which served to flatter the ex-colonies with the old and decadent peninsula. He reprinted his work Estudios de crítica literaria (1892–1908) in five volumes and some Ensayos de crítica filosófica (1892), in parallel form to each other, which were done in his namesake as the director of the National Library of Madrid.

== Works ==
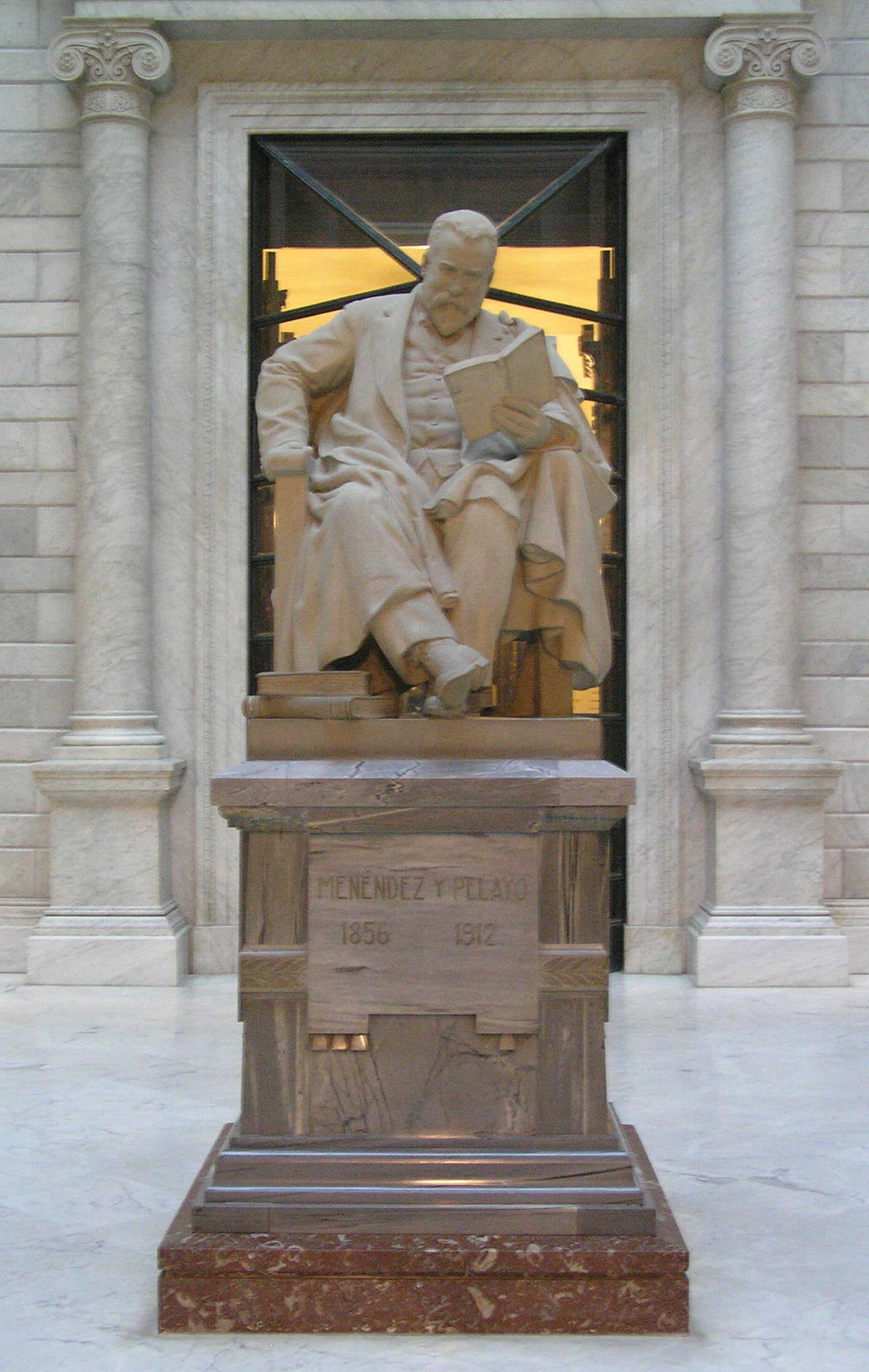
Statue of Marcelino Menéndez y Pelayo in the lobby of the Biblioteca Nacional de España.

- La novela entre los Latinos (Santander, 1875). (His doctoral thesis)
- Estudios críticos sobre escritores montañeses. I. Trueba y Cosío (Santander, 1876).
- Polémicas, indicaciones y proyectos sobre la ciencia española (Madrid, 1876).
- La ciencia española, 2ª edition (Madrid, 1887–1880).
- Horacio en España (Madrid, 1877, 2ª ed. 1885).
- Estudios poéticos (Madrid, 1878).
- Odas, epístolas y tragedias (Madrid, 1906).
- Traductores españoles de la Eneida (Madrid, 1879).
- Traductores de las Églogas y Geórgicas de Virgilio (Madrid, 1879).
- Historia de los heterodoxos españoles (Madrid, 1880–1882).
- Calderón y su teatro (Madrid, 1881).
- Dramas de Guillermo Shakespeare translation (Barcelona, 1881).
- Obras completas de Marco Tulio Cicerón, translation (Madrid, 1881–1884).
- Historia de las ideas estéticas en España (Madrid, 1883–1889).
- Estudios de crítica literaria (Madrid, 1884).
- Obras de Lope de Vega, 1890–1902.
- Antología de poetas líricos castellanos desde la formación del idioma hasta nuestros días, 1890–1908.
- Ensayos de crítica filosófica (Madrid, 1892).
- Antología de poetas hispano-americanos, 1893–1895.
- Historia de la poesía hispano-americana (Madrid, 1911).
- Bibliografía hispano-latina clásica (Madrid, 1902).
- Orígenes de la novela (Madrid, 1905–1915).
- El doctor D. Manuel Milá y Fontanals. Semblanza literaria (Barcelona, 1908).
- Obras Completas, started in 1911.
- "Biblioteca de traductores españoles", in Obras Completas, Madrid

=== Works in translation ===
- A History of the Spanish Heterodox, Book One, Translated by Eladia Gomez-Posthill; Saint Austin Press, London, 2009; ISBN 1-901157-98-9.

== See also ==
- A lo divino
