= Vizcaínos =

Coordinates: 42°06′N 3°16′W

Vizcaínos, Spain
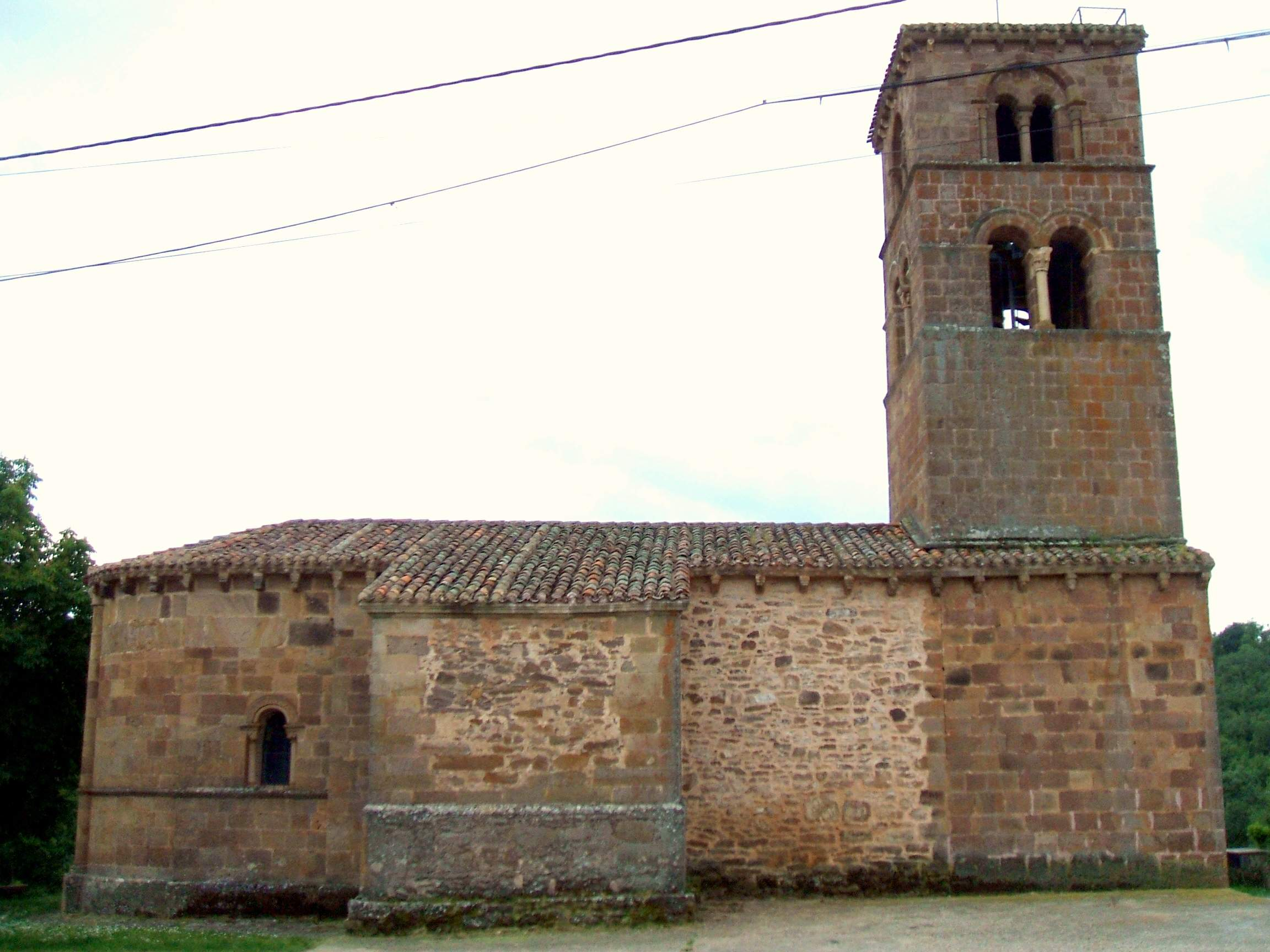
- Church of San Martin de Tours in Vizcainos
- Interactive map of Vizcaínos, Spain
- Country: Spain
- Autonomous community: Castile and León
- Province: Burgos
- Municipality: Vizcaínos

Area
  - Total: 11 km^{2} (4.2 sq mi)

Population (2025-01-01)
  - Total: 41
  - Density: 3.7/km^{2} (9.7/sq mi)
- Time zone: UTC+1 (CET)
  - Summer (DST): UTC+2 (CEST)

Vizcaínos is a municipality located in the province of Burgos, Castile and León, Spain. According to the 2004 census (INE), the municipality has a population of 57 inhabitants.
