= Fernando Fernández de Velasco =

Spanish politician (1835–1912)

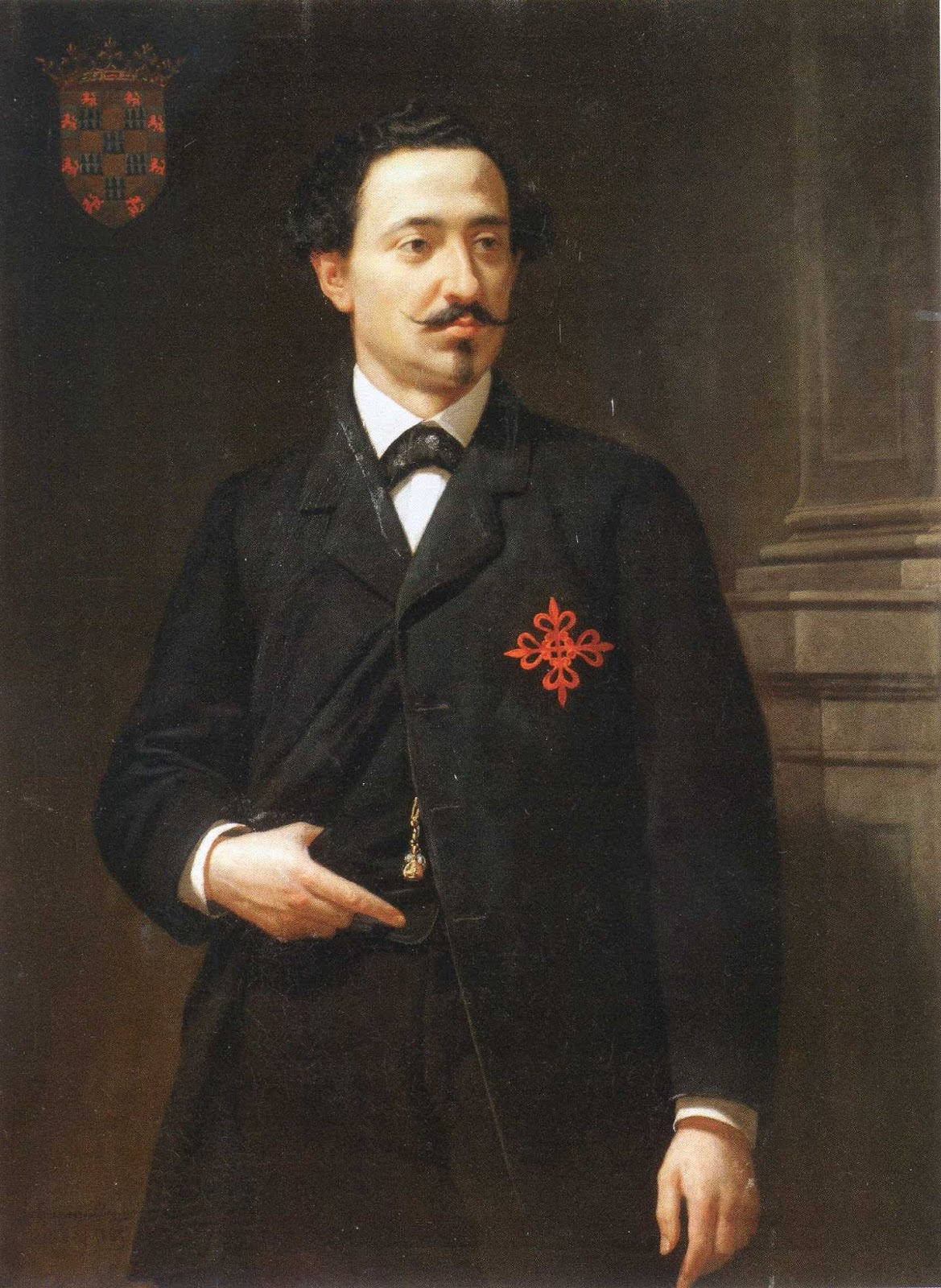
- 1865 portrait by Ignacio Suárez Llanos.

Member of the Congress of Deputies
- In office 3 April 1867 – 6 December 1868
- Constituency: Santander

Personal details
- Born: 29 May 1835 Burgos, Kingdom of Spain
- Died: 30 November 1912 (aged 77) Villacarriedo, Kingdom of Spain
- Party: Integrist Party
- Education: Complutense University of Madrid
- Occupation: Politician, journalist, lawyer and art critic
- Awards: Order of Calatrava

Fernando Fernández de Velasco (29 May 1835 – 30 November 1912) was a Spanish journalist and traditionalist politician.

== Biografía ==
His parents were Luis Fernando Fernández de Velasco y de la Sota Herrera and Jacinta Pérez de Soñanes y Villegas, both descendant of Cantabrian noble families. Their royalist ideology caused the family's banishment to France, where Fernando lived most of his childhood. After their return to Spain he finished his studies at Villacarriedo and graduated with a licenciate degree in law at the University of Madrid.

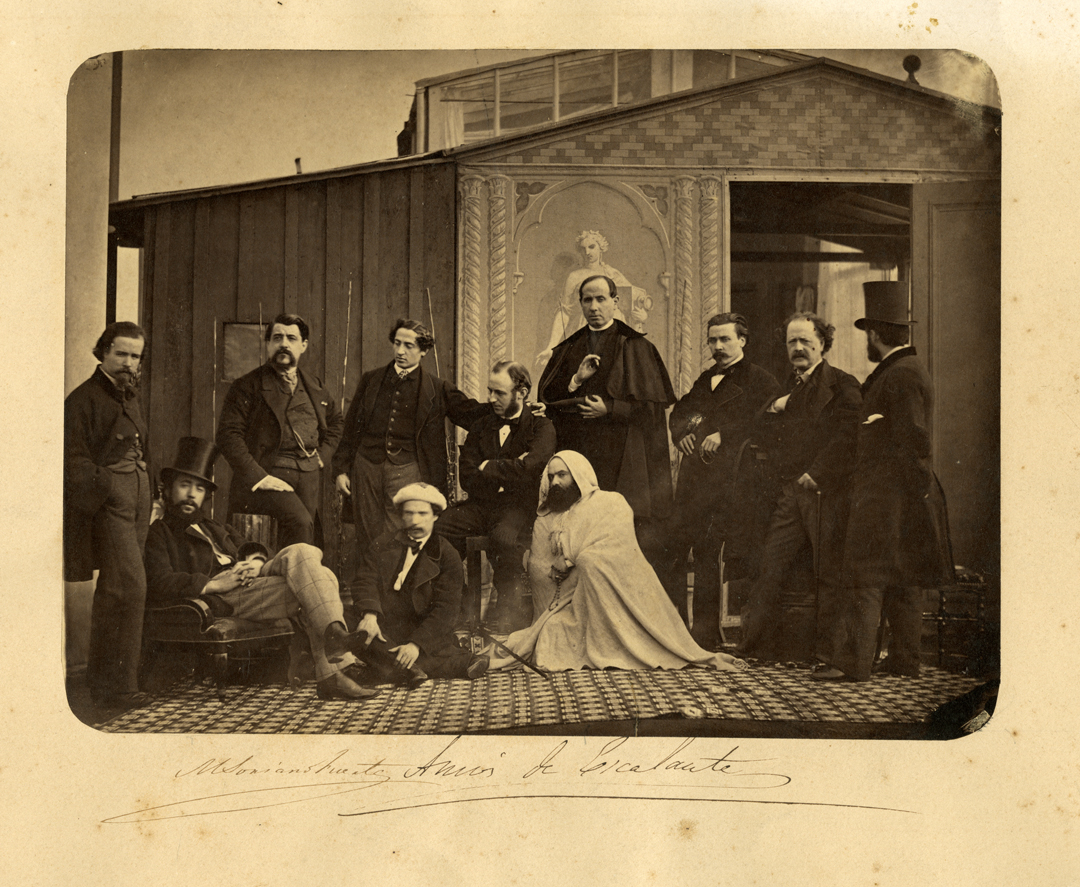
Fernández de Velasco together with Amós de Escalante, Pedro Antonio de Alarcón and other Spanish artists at the studio of Altobelli-Molins (Rome, 1861)

He travelled to Rome while working at the Spanish embassy to the Holy See. During his stay there he kept practicing Law profession and ventured into fine arts, standing out as a painter and a renowned art critic. Back to Spain he was made a Knight of the Order of Calatrava in 1863 and devoted himself fully to the defense of traditionalist ideology both through the press and through political actions.

He was elected a deputy for Santander in 1867 as a member of the traditionalist faction led by Cándido Nocedal at the Spanish Congress, becoming one of its most vocal representatives. After the dethronement of Isabel II by the Revolution of 1868 Fernández de Velasco sided with pretender Don Carlos. He ran as candidate to the constituent assembly at the 1869 Spanish general election, but was defeated.

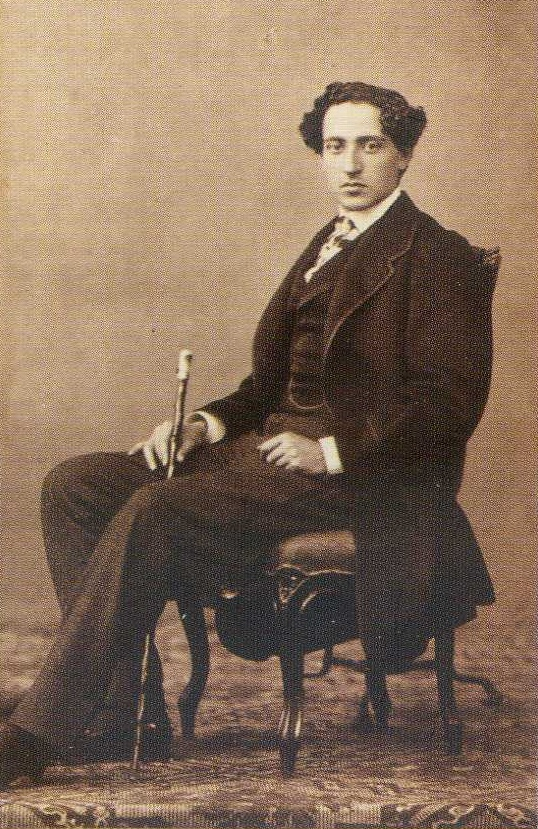
Fernando Fernández de Velasco, circa 1860

He collaborated enthusiastically with the organization of the Carlist forces of Cantabria and was designated as president of the provincial junta of the Traditionalist Communion. Soon before the outbreak of the Third Carlist War he was made subcomisario regio of Cantabria. In 1872 he presided the Cantabrian war board, organized the local recruitment and managed to rise two infantry battalions, a cavalry squad and two compañías that intervened in various military actions in La Montaña and the Basque Country.

Once the civil war had ended he went into exile in France in 1876, where he lived until the indult that allowed banished Carlists to return to Spain. He continued defending traditionalism through his writings in La Verdad and El Siglo Futuro.

After the traditionalist schism he joined the Integrist Party, helping Ramón Nocedal with the organization of the new movement and leading many press campaigns aimed at promoting Integralism in Spain. On his last years he retired to his family palace at Villacarriedo, where he died in 1912.

== Works ==
- Discurso escrito por Don Fernando Fernández de Velasco, sobre la Tesis XIV. Aprobado por la Censura y aceptado por la Junta Central para ser leído en sesión pública del Congreso Católico de Zaragoza (Madrid, 1890)
- Don Juan Fernández de Isla, sus empresas y sus fábricas (Madrid, 1901)
- Observaciones sobre el proyecto de Ferrocarril entre Burgos y Santander (Madrid, 1908)
