= Janer =

Janer is a surname. Notable people with the surname include:

- Ana Janer, Puerto Rican physician
- David Janer (born 1973), Spanish actor
- Erasmo Janer Gironella (1833–1911), Spanish entrepreneur and politician
- Gabriel Janer Manila (born 1940), Spanish writer
- Manuela Janer Cabanyes (1696–1760), Spanish businesswoman
- Victor Christ-Janer (1915–2008), American architect
