= Miguel Junyent Rovira =

Spanish Catalan publisher and politician

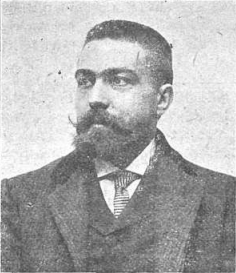
- Born: Miguel Junyent Rovira; 1871; Piera, Spain
- Died: 1936 (aged 64–65); Barcelona, Spain
- Occupations: lawyer, publisher
- Known for: politician, publisher
- Political party: Traditionalist Communion

Miguel Junyent Rovira (Catalan: Miquel Junyent i Rovira) (1871–1936) was a Spanish Catalan publisher and politician. He is best known as director of El Correo Catalán, the newspaper he periodically owned and managed between 1903 and 1933. As a politician he was active within Carlism; he remained the regional Catalan party leader in 1915–1916 and in 1919–1933. He twice served in the Cortes, in 1907–1910 as member of the Congress of Deputies and in 1918–1919 as member of the Senate. He is counted among moderate Carlists, who favored alliance with conservative Catalanists and opposed the violent faction within his party.

== Family and youth ==
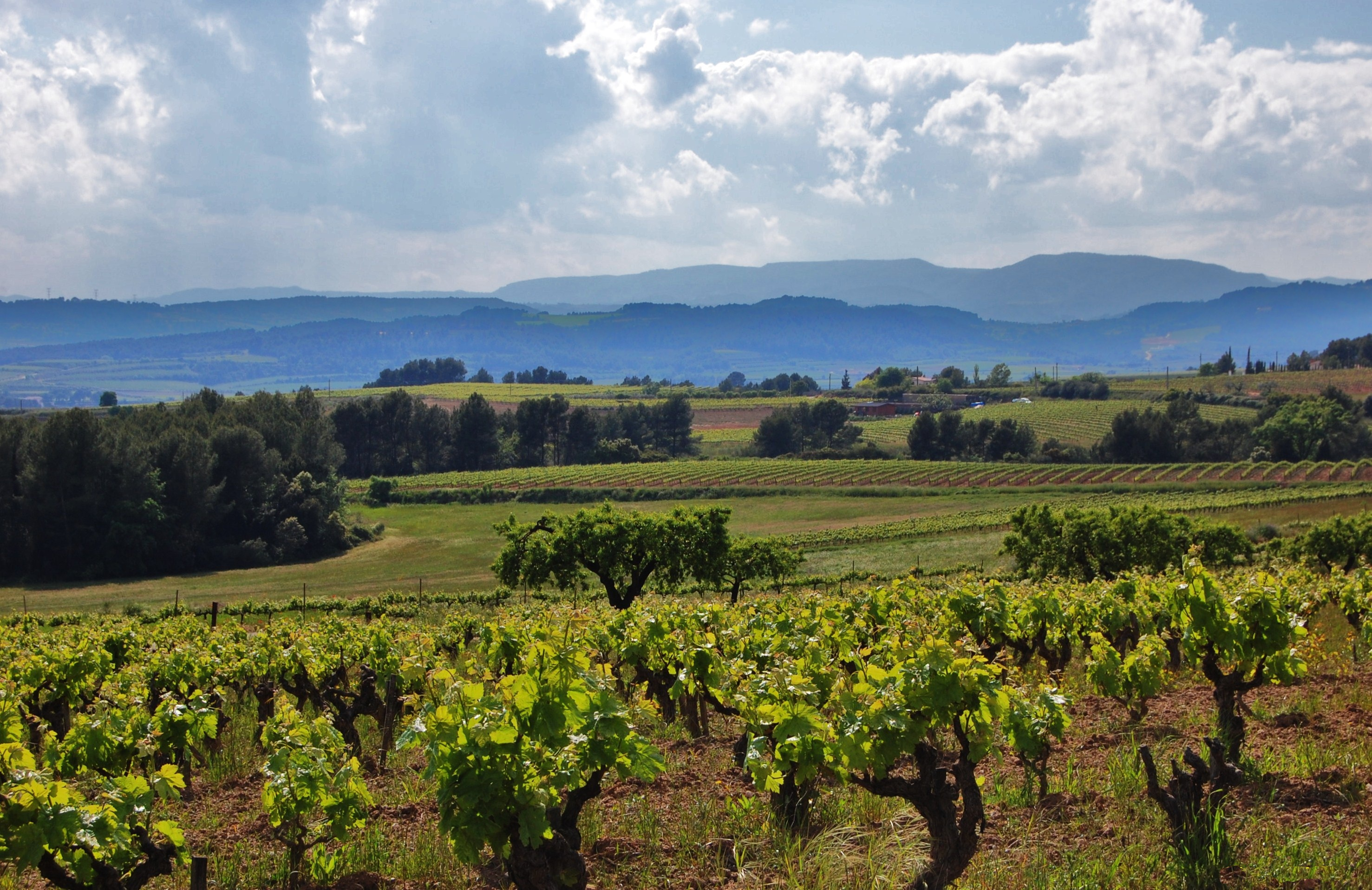
countryside near Piera

The Catalan Junyent family was first noted in the 13th century and a few of its representatives distinguished themselves in the history of Spain, yet it is not clear whether any counted among the forefathers of Miguel. None of the sources consulted provides any information on his distant ancestors; the only one identified along the patriline is his father, Salvador Junyent Bovés (1836–1900). He spent all his life in the Catalan town of Piera and it seems that he ranked in the local bourgeoisie, listed as one of the local propietarios and at times among the "more important" ones; he owned an estate known as Can Perevells. Salvador married a girl from Cornella de Llobregat, Prudencia Rovira Oller (1837–1914), possibly related to a local industrialist family. It is not clear how many children they had; it is known that Miguel had at least one sister.

Nothing is known about the childhood of Miguel in general or about his early education in particular. At unspecified time though probably in the late 1880s he entered the law faculty of the Barcelona University; he graduated in jurisprudence shortly before or in 1895. He formally entered the Barcelona colegio de abogados in 1897 and in the very late 19th century he was officially recorded as a practicing lawyer. In 1901 he was listed among juzgados municipales, noted as fiscal in Sant Gervasi de Cassoles; in the early 20th century he acted as defense attorney and specialized in civil law.

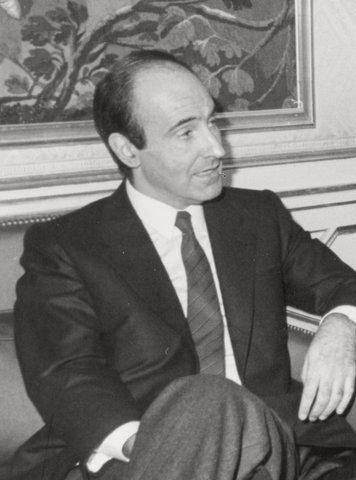
Miquel Roca Junyent

At unspecified time though prior to 1898 Miguel Junyent married Joaquína Quintana Padró (1874–1912); close to nothing is known about her or her family. The couple settled in Barcelona and had 3 children. As a widower and sometime before 1916 Junyent remarried with a widow, Mercedes Canalías Vintró (died 1934); the couple had no own children. The oldest daughter of Miguel and Joaquína died in early childhood. Their son, José María Junyent Quintana (1901–1982), already in the 1930s was a locally known Carlist politician; he briefly served in the Barcelona ayuntamiento in the 1940s, but he made his name mostly as periodsta and partially as a writer, assuming distinguished positions in the Catalan press corps of the 1950s. The younger daughter María de Montserrat Junyent Quintana (1905–1985) married Juan Baptista Roca Caball, a well-known Catalan Christian-democratic politician of late Francoism. Among Junyent's grandchildren Miguel Roca Junyent became one of the most recognized politicians of early post-Francoist era, counted among "fathers of the 1978 constitution"; Miguel Junyent Armenteras grew to high executive positions in the world of Catalan commercial finance.

== Early public engagements (1894–1906) ==
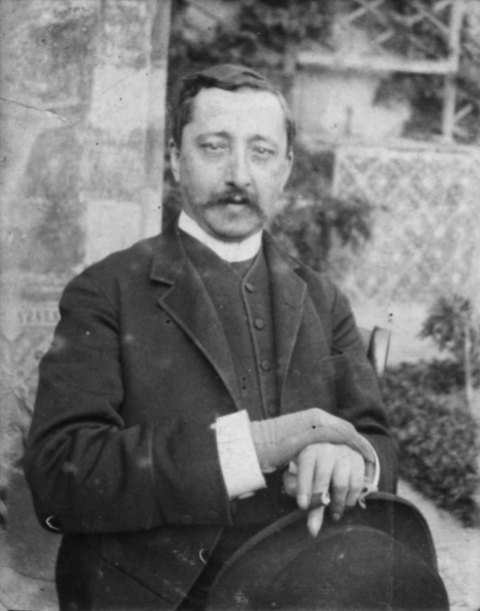
Lluis Llauder

None of the sources consulted provides information on political preferences of Junyent's ancestors, though it seems that his father was a Traditionalist, possibly close to Integrism. The young Miguel already during his academic period was active in conservative organizations; in 1891 he acted as secretary of Junta Directiva del Asociación de San Luis Gonzaga and engaged in the Barcelona branch of Juventud Carlista, growing to its vice-treasurer prior to 1894. In the mid-1890s noted in various religious initiatives he was also speaking at local Carlist círculos, reportedly applauded by the public and by some party heavyweights. This is how he attracted attention of the regional Carlist jefé Luis Llauder y Dalmases, also the owner and manager of the unofficial regional party mouthpiece, El Correo Catalán. Llauder invited Junyent to contribute to El Correo, which soon turned into a permanent collaboration. At the turn of the centuries Llauder's health was already seriously deteriorating; following his death the daily was taken over by Fomento de la Prensa Tradicionalista, a Carlist institutional outpost. In 1903 its president duque de Solferino appointed Junyent the new director of El Correo; the caretaker manager Salvador Morales was nominated editor-in-chief but he served briefly and departed for Madrid shortly.

As head of El Correo Catalán Junyent became one of the leading figures of Catalan Carlism and one of the key party propagandists nationwide. When attending Traditionalist Barcelona rallies or meetings of the mid-1900s Junyent started to appear alongside regional party tycoons like Erasmo Janer or Mariano Fortuny. Initially his political stand did not differ very much from the orthodox party line, exalting Catholic religion and hailing Traditionalist values though also lambasting Jewish conspiracy and masonic designs. This did not spare him animadversion of the Integrists, who suspected Junyent of secret negotiations with the Maurista branch of the Conservatives and charged him with embracing liberalism.

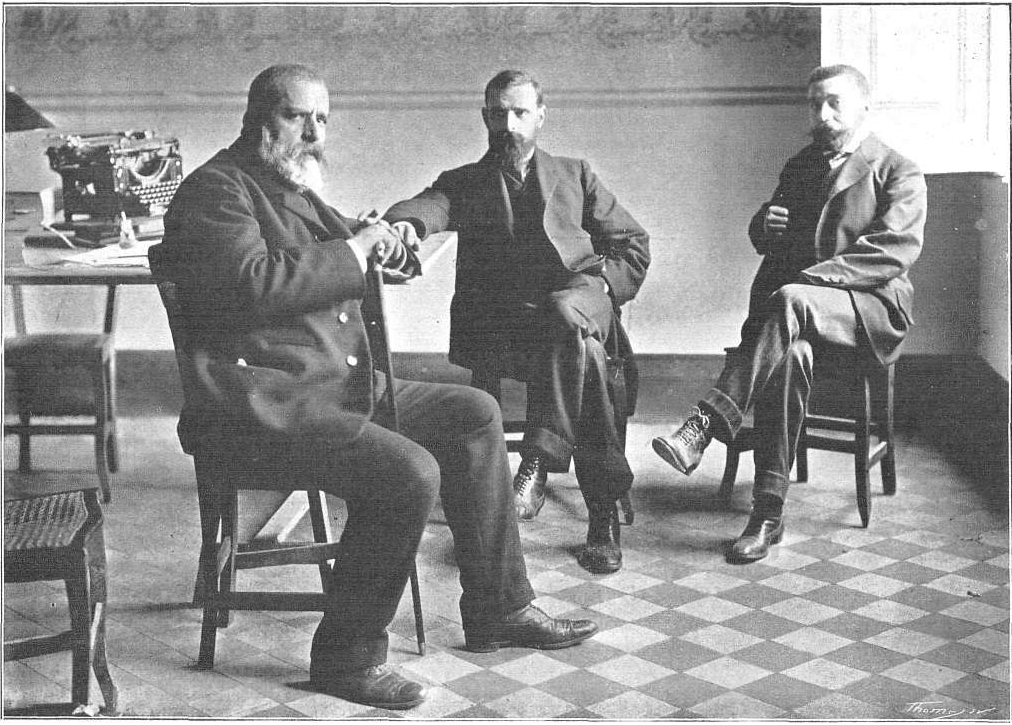
Junyent among Solidaritat leaders

In 1906 Junyent represented Traditionalists in talks with other Catalan political groupings when mounting a common front against Ley de Jurisdicciones, a newly adopted regulation which placed perceived offences against the army and state under the military jurisdiction; in Catalonia it was widely perceived as assault on the region and its identity. He emerged as one of the leaders of the movement, and together with Francesc Cambó Junyent was entrusted with a mission of travelling to Madrid and coordinating action with dissenting parliamentarians. Later that year the Catalan opposition took shape of Solidaritat Catalana, a block of local parties opposed to the Ley; within his party Junyent was lobbying for taking part in the coalition and was the only Carlist who signed the document which founded the alliance. Together with Cambó and José Roca y Roca he also entered the informal triumvirate which ran Solidaritat and entered its Comité Executiu, later together with Solferino co-signing on part of the Carlists.

== Versus catalanismo and pistolerismo (1907–1915) ==
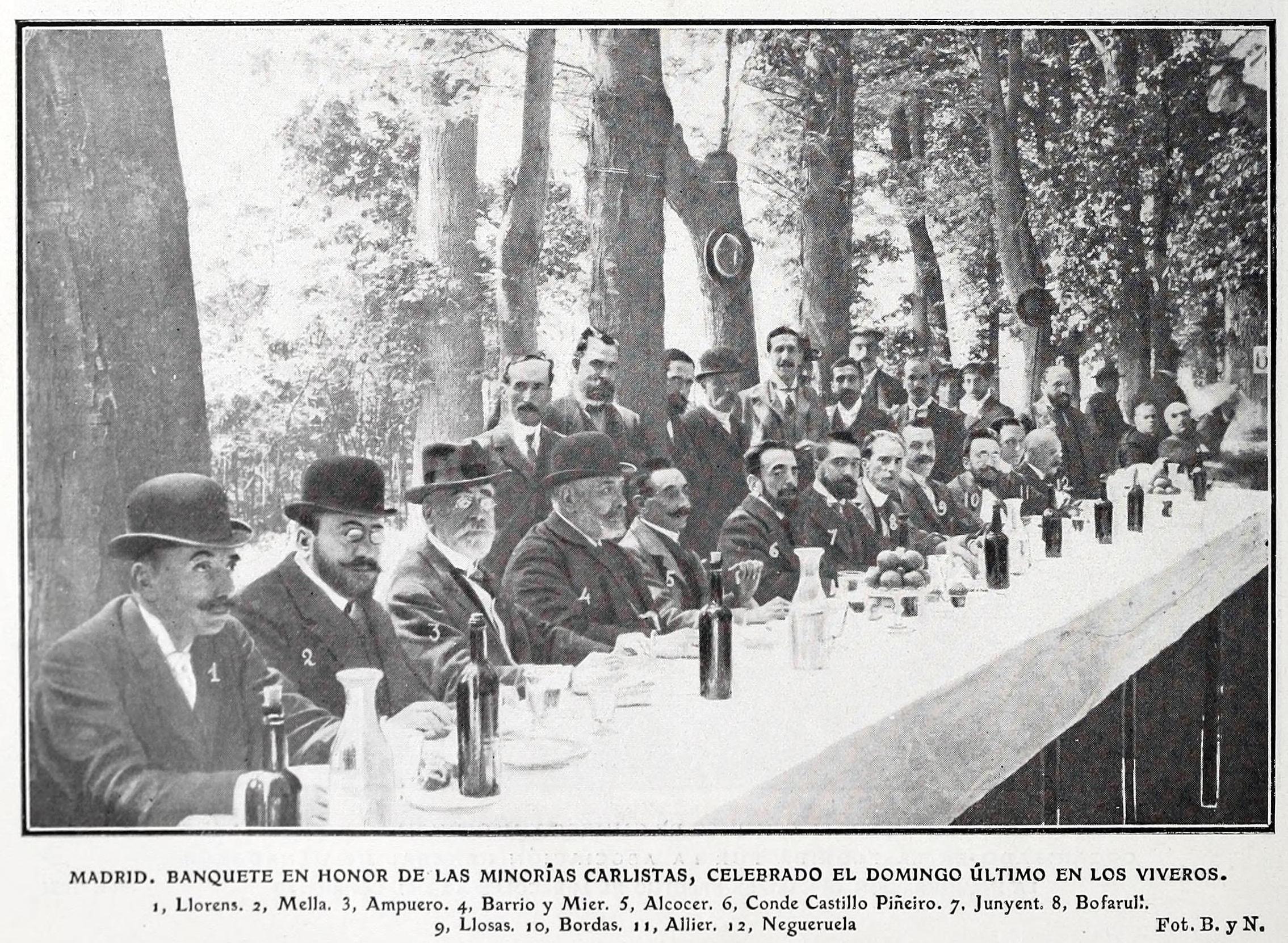
Junyent among Carlist MPs, 1907

Prior to the 1907 general elections the Catalan Carlists were divided by the question of would-be alliance with republicans and nationalists within a joint Solidaritat list; Junyent was among key advocates of the coalition and managed to win over the new regional leader, Janer, who authorized the Carlist entry into the partnership. Following some haggling with La Lliga Junyent was agreed to stand in Vic and with hardly any opposition he won comfortably. The Carlist entry into Solidaritat produced great success for the party, with 6 Carlists elected in Catalonia only. Junyent himself became one of Traditionalist tycoons in the region and entered the nationwide political scene; though in the Carlist Cortes minority, he continued also as member of Comité Directivo of Solidaritat MPs. In the chamber he was moderately active, usually voicing on Catalan or religious issues.

In 1908–1909 Solidaritat was gradually disintegrating as parties forming the alliance were pursuing increasingly incompatible goals. The Carlists were more and more anxious about partnership with parties suspected of separatism; Junyent for some time tried to alleviate the charges, e.g. by declaring that for local Traditionalists Catalonia was a sister province to all other provinces, and Spain was their common mother. However, in 1909 also he developed grave doubts; El Correo was increasingly engaged in polemics with Catalan nationalists and some Junyent's editorials assumed belligerent tone, lambasting "cobardes y canallas". By next general elections of 1910 Solidaritat was already defunct; Junyent managed to negotiate merely a local alliance with La Lliga, and as a joint carlista-liguero candidate he tried to renew his Cortes bid from Vic. This time he lost marginally to a Liberal candidate; his protests pointing to alleged corruption proved ineffective.

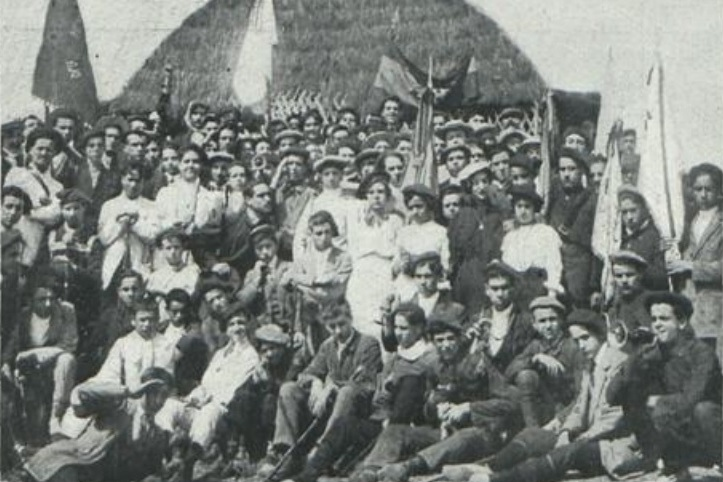
Catalan Requeté, 1912

In the early 1910s Junyent was member to a moderate faction of Catalan Carlists led by subsequent provincial jefe, Duque de Solferino. Their opponents in the Catalan party ranks were led by Dalmacio Iglesias, who advocated a strategy of urban violence aimed mostly against the radical republicans. Iglesias intended to develop the newly born paramilitary Requeté organization into a street task force, an instrument of militant pistolerismo; this approach climaxed in the 1911 urban battle in Sant Feliú de Llobregat. For Junyent and Solferino the role of requeté would be rather to guarantee "the free exercise by all citizens of their legitimate rights " and to be "a body of voluntary Civil Guards that only molests those who live from the booty of disorder, violence and anarchy". If they managed to prevail and keep the hotheads in check it was only with great difficulty, and largely thanks to perfect relations with the new Carlist king, Don Jaime. Junyent travelled to Venice to greet the pretender when he assumed the claim, and in 1914 he travelled to Viareggio to receive instructions on conduct of Carlist propaganda following outbreak of the First World War. As former MP, manager of El Correo and member of the provincial executive Junyent appeared also on party rallies across Catalonia or beyond.

== Towards Catalan party jefatura (1915-1919) ==
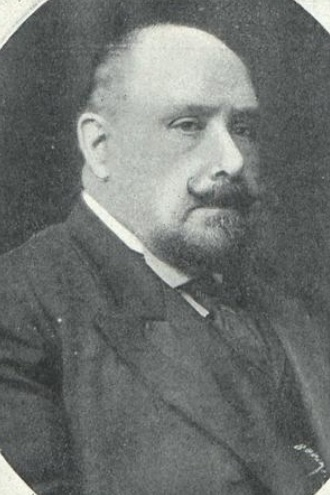
Duque de Solferino

Overwhelmed by internal conflicts Solferino resigned as the Catalan party jefe in 1915. As his closest collaborator, representative of similar moderate line and a politician extremely loyal to Don Jaime, Junyent was nominated his successor. He was immediately subject to onslaught on part of 3 partially overlapping groups of inner opposition: violent radicals accused him of appeasement versus "regionalismo conservador", anti-Catalanists lambasted his perceived penchant towards "derecha nacionalista" and the emerging Mellistas were unhappy about his utter loyalty to Don Jaime, even though El Correo Catalán tended to sympathize with Germany rather than with the Entente. All these factions focused on Iglesias as their leader; when in 1916 the national party jefé Marqúes de Cerralbo endorsed him as the party candidate in general elections from Lerida another crisis ensued. Eventually the entire Junta Provincial including Junyent as its head handed their resignations; Solferino was reinstated as the Catalan jefé.

Changes in local party leadership did not prevent growing fragmentation of Catalan Carlism in the late 1910s. According to one scholar around 1917 it was divided into a faction led by Junyent and Lluís Argemí and a group headed by Miguel Salellas and Teodoro Más; according to another by 1919 there were 3 groups, the Jaimistas with Junyent, Bartolomé Trías and Juan María Roma, the Ateneo faction championed by Pablo Vives and the Mellista section led by Iglesias. Still more confusing was emergence of Carlism-flavored trade unions, catering to urban proletariat; during foundation of Sindicato Libre Regional in Barcelona in 1919 Junyent was present and supportive, though soon the Libres would emancipate and vehemently deny any Traditionalist heritage.

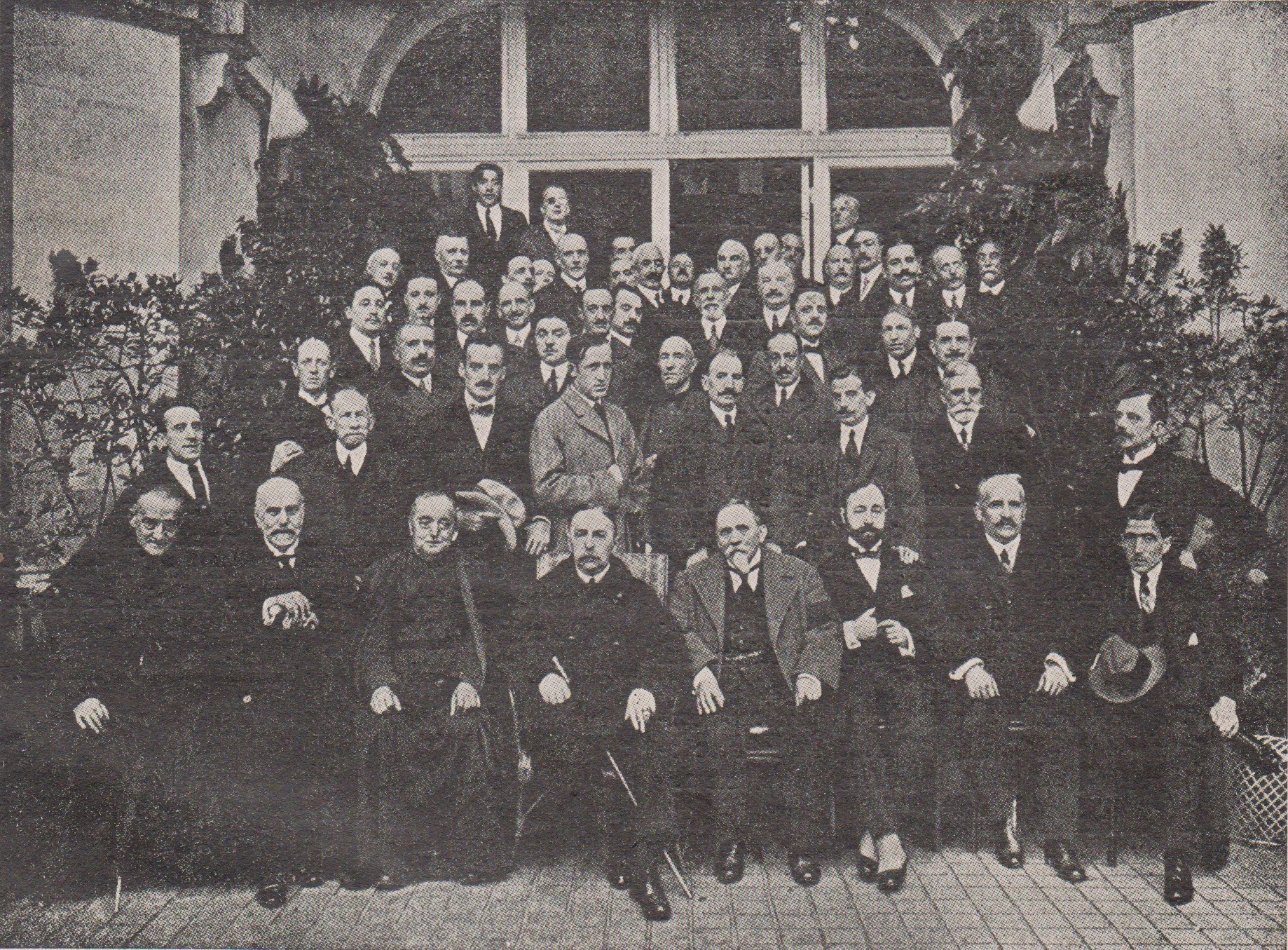
Junyent and Junta de Biarritz, 1919

Junyent cautiously tried to navigate his way between violent urban insurrectionism, nationalist separatism, Mellista concept of grand ultra-right alliance and watering down of Traditionalist ideario in an ambiguous bourgeoisie coalition. Though lambasting "nacionalistas cuando se atribuyen la representación de Cataluña" he tried not to burn the bridges with La Lliga. It was thanks to the Lliguista support that in 1918 – still officially listed as abogado - he was elected as the Barcelona representative to the Senate. His entry into the upper chamber coincided with explosive climax of the Mellista fronde within Carlism; in early 1919 de Mella and his supports broke away to form their own organization, the move which decimated command party layers across the country. Junyent maintained his trademark loyalty to Don Jaime; he took part in Magna Junta de Biarritz, a grand meeting supposed to set the party course for the future, and for the second time was nominated the Catalan leader. Unlike the first brief episode, this time his string at the helm of regional Carlism would last 14 years.

== Senate, Mancomunitat and ayuntamiento (1919-1923) ==
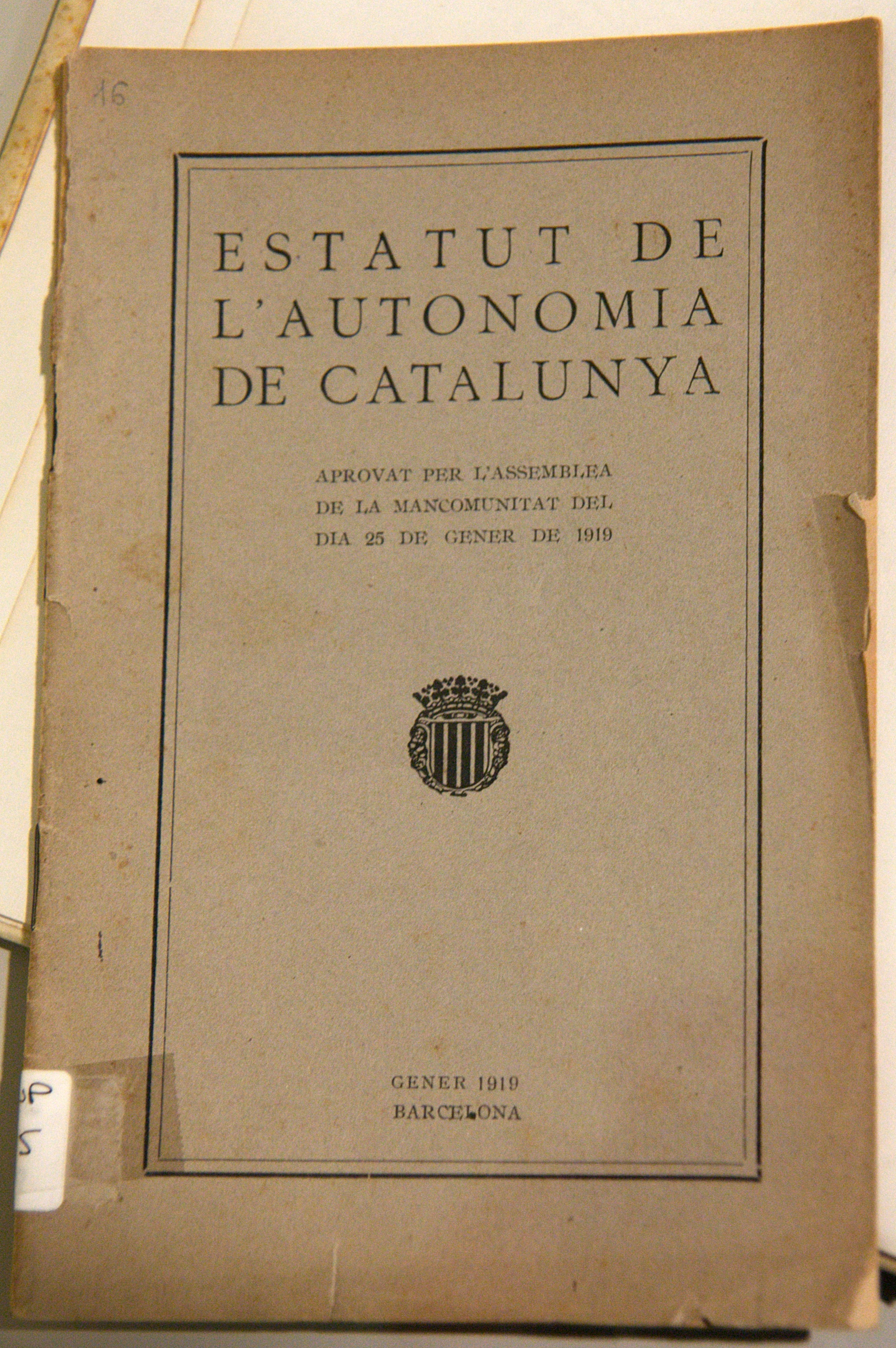
Autonomy draft, 1919

In the Senate Junyent did not distinguish himself with notable activity; in internal works of the chamber he remained rather passive. However, he became heavily engaged in talks between Cortes and a newly formed makeshift Catalan quasi-government, Mancomunitat. Already in 1918 Junyent entered the editorial committee of Bases d’Autonomia de Catalunya, appointed by Mancomunitat; he also joined comisión extraparlamentaria set up by the Cortes with the purpose of negotiating Catalan autonomous regulations. Junyent joined the faction which advocated unilateral declaration of autonomy instead of pushing the project through the Madrid parliament, which he thought would only water it down. In 1919 together with Cambó and Lerroux he emerged as member of an informal Catalan triumvirate leading the project, joined a common commission formed by Mancomunitat and the Cortes, and edited autonomy text to be subject to popular plebiscite. Together with Cambó and Lerroux, Junyent was also among key Catalan leaders who decided to suspend the autonomy campaign in the spring of 1919, in wake of major strike and social unrest engulfing the region. His ticket in the senate expired in 1919 and apparently he made no effort to renew it.

In his public activity – including support for the Mancomunitat-driven autonomy attempt – Junyent acted not only on his own behalf but also as representative of the Carlists, now named the Jaimistas. In 1920, as the Mellista breakup kept decimating the party, he went on underlining his total loyalty to Don Jaime and in El Correo Catalán he declared that the Traditionalists must stay united behind their claimant. He presided or attended closed Traditionalist meetings and public rallies, in 1920-1921 remained active also in increasingly paralyzed Mancomunitat. At the time he was getting increasingly skeptical about social and political developments in Spain; in the early 1920s El Correo was criticizing growing anarchy and chaos, especially that Junyent himself almost fell victim to a bomb attack, intended to kill the civil governor. It seems that at the time El Correo Catalán was already his own property; businesswise Junyent was also engaged in Banco Catalán, as he presided over its Consejo de Administración.

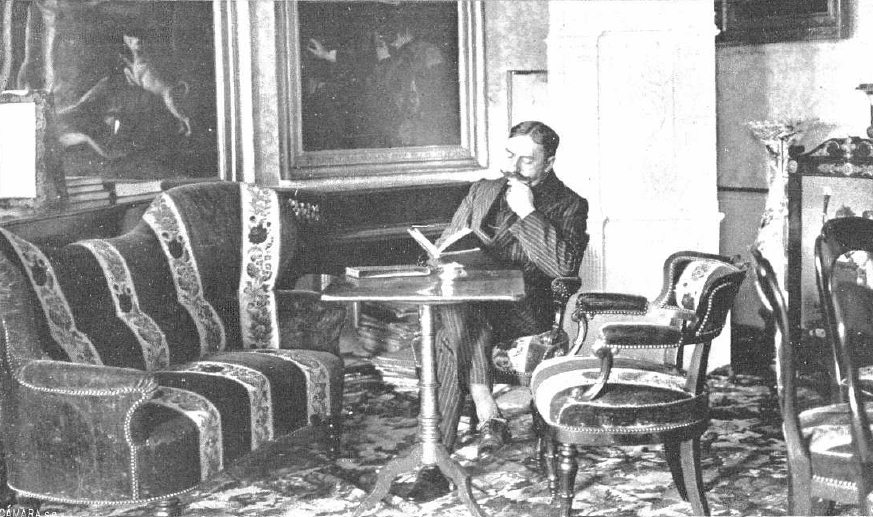
Don Jaime, 1920s

In early 1922 Junyent ran to the Barcelona ayuntamiento on the Traditionalist ticket and was elected from distrito cuarto. The same year he was nominated teniente de alcalde, one of the deputy mayors, confirmed on this position in 1923. He adhered to his trademark balanced political position and in the town hall he maintained good relations with moderate Catalanists from La Lliga, admitting reservations but in general declaring himself in support for ideas of its defunct leader, Prat de la Riba. Junyent remained tractable and conciliatory; in June 1923, when the ayuntamiento was locked in internal crisis, he offered to resign his tenencia de alcaldía. He also intervened in favor of Traditionalist trade-unionists from Sindicatos Libres, at times in trouble with the forces of order. In his capacity of the Barcelona concejal Junyent hosted also his king, Don Jaime, during the claimant's 5-day stay in the city in July 1923.

== Dictatorship (1923-1931) ==
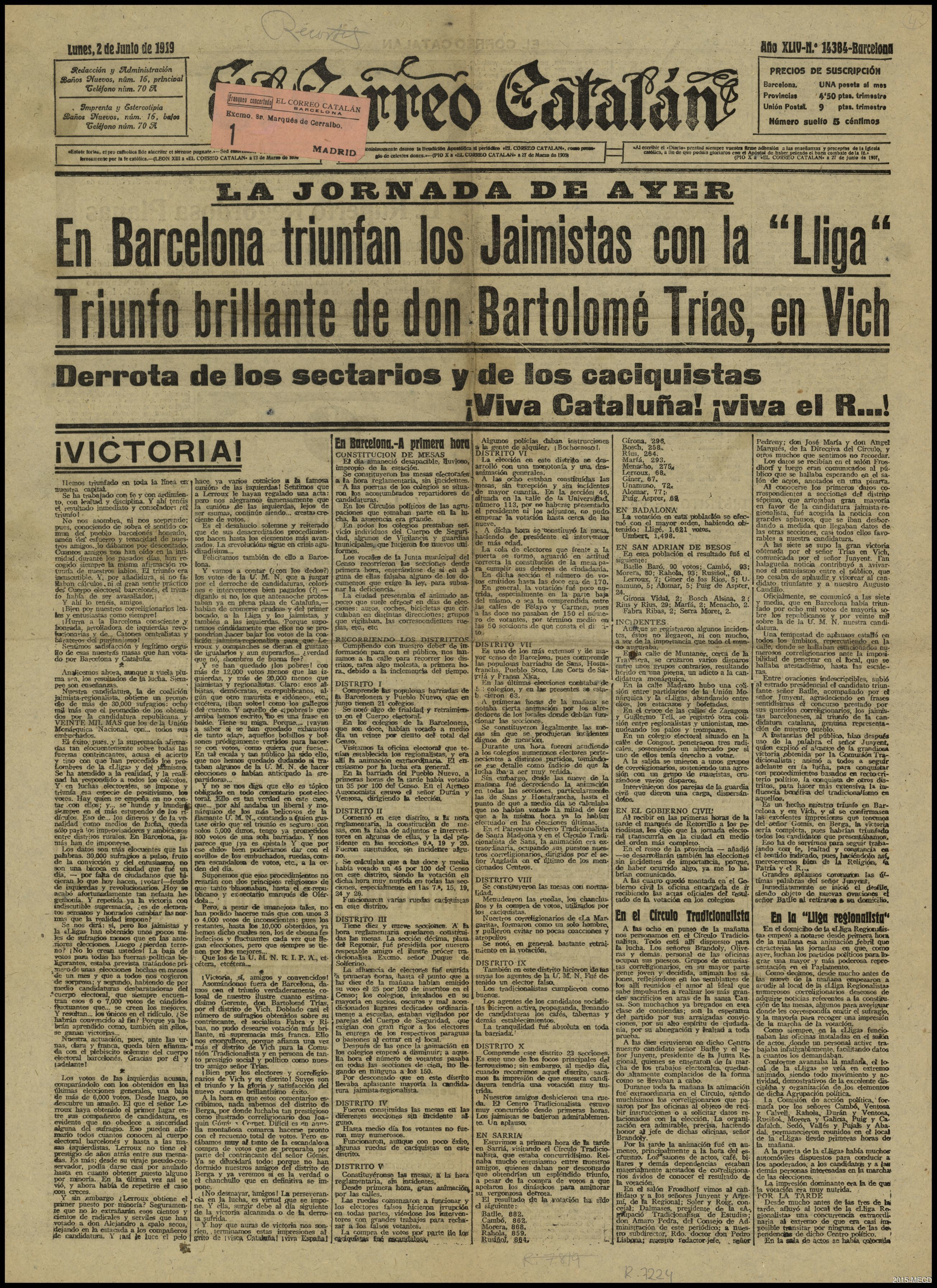
El Correo Catalán

Increasingly anxious about growing political chaos and social unrest, like many Carlists Junyent seemed to have appreciated the advent of Primo de Rivera dictatorship; already in mid-1923 he took part in Somatén feast together with the Barcelona capitán general. His cautious support started to evaporate following first measures of the new regime. By the end of 1923 he was deposed from the Barcelona ayuntamiento, his career in the town hall terminated after less than 2 years; in 1924 the ban on usage of Catalan in public administration prompted him to sign an open letter, which demanded that the language be freely used across the region; finally, in 1924 he was trialed retroactively in relation to his 1918 article in El Correo Catalán; the piece in question technically called for Spain to maintain strict neutrality during the Great War, but the prosecutor charged Junyent with instigating rebellion. Outcome of the case is not known.

At the time Junyent remained in close touch with his king Don Jaime; in late 1923 he travelled to Paris to get latest instructions on proper Carlist stand versus the dictadura, and made the same trip in early 1924 and then later the same year. In the mid-1920s the party position towards the regime changed and evolved first into non-participation and then into criticism. As the Catalan regional jefé Junyent issued a series of orders which warned the rank-and-file not to engage in official structures and introduced sort of internal party censorship, aimed to enforce united stand of the Catalan Carlist press; as director of El Correo Catalán and within limits permitted by censorship, he tried to propagate the same stand in his daily. His own public activity was largely reduced to Traditionalist or religious gatherings, like celebrating Fiesta de Monarquía Tradicional; in 1925 he led a large Carlist pilgrimage to Rome. However, in 1926 he was noted also as admitted by the minister of interior; neither the purpose not the outcome of the visit is known.

Carlist standard

There is scarce information on Junyent public activities of the second half of the 1920s; going on as the Carlist Catalan jefé he already received homages as a distinguished leader and remained among key nationwide party politicians meeting Don Jaime, e.g. during his visit to the claimant's residence in Frohsdorf. Traditionally steering clear of risky enterprises, in the late 1920s he intervened to defuse a plot to mount sort of a rising in Seu d’Urgell, contemplated by some young Carlist hotheads. Once dictatorship gave way to dictablanda he resumed efforts aimed at Catalan autonomy. When presidents of provincial Catalan diputaciones met in 1930 in what seemed like an effort to re-create Mancomunitat, Junyent in El Correo claimed that the Catalan problem required "solución integral y definitiva", yet he did not fail to note that with own language, laws, flag and spirit, Catalonia "es española porque es profundamente catalana". In February 1931 he entered new comisión extraparlamentaria, supposed to work on an autonomy statute.

== Republic (1931-1933) ==
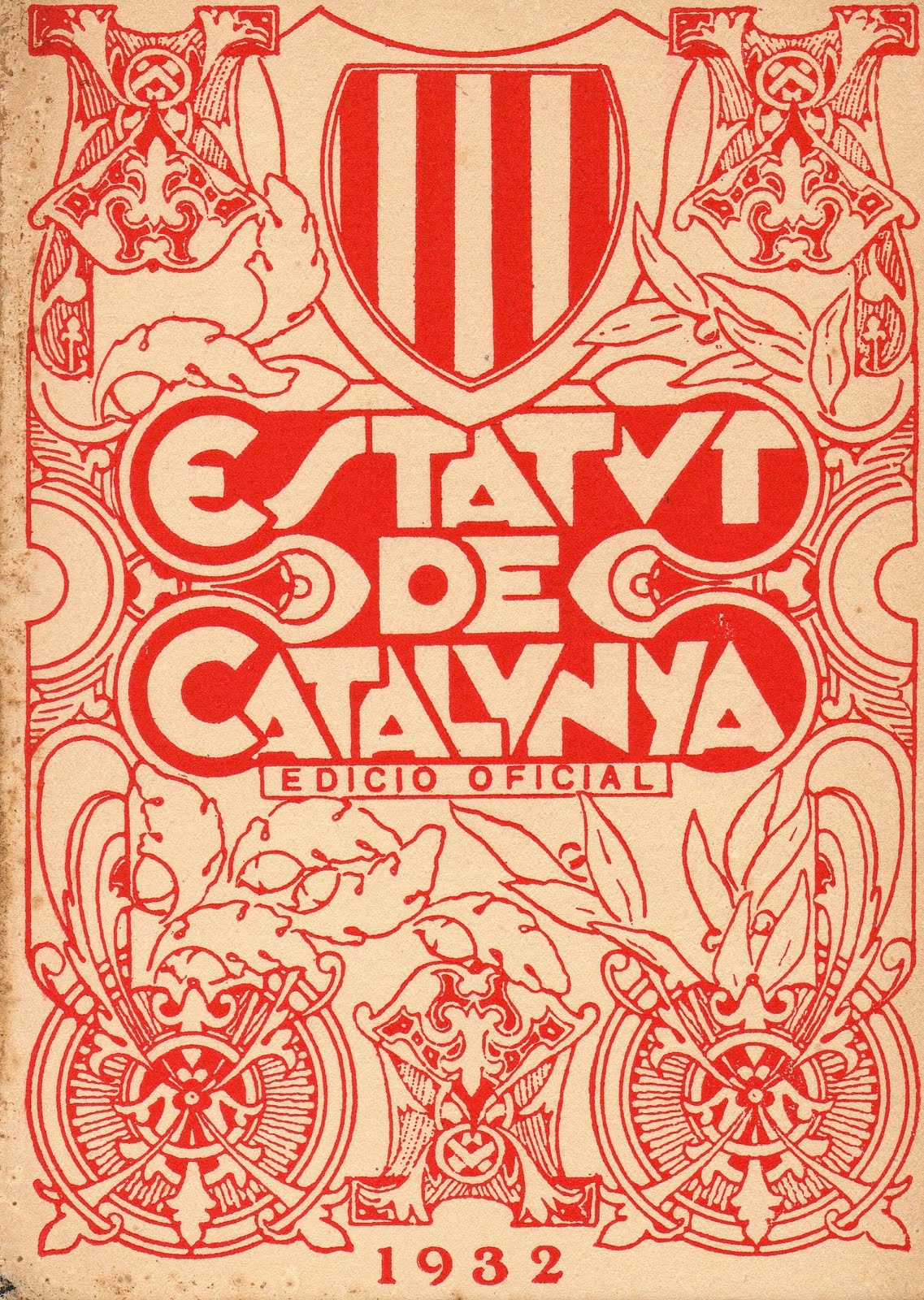
autonomy statute, 1932

Junyent greeted the advent of the Republic with far-reaching skepticism. In late 1931 he asserted that the new Cortes remained "politically, socially and religiously extremist and dictatorial", and that they advanced legislation "contra de sentimiento y espíritu tradicional de nuestra raza". Though far from instigating violence, he was detained following Barcelona riots which involved the Carlist youth and spent short time in a prison ship Dédalo, released in December 1931. When in 1932 members of the Sanjurjo conspiracy sounded him on would-be co-operation Junyent refused to commit himself quoting insufficient manpower and authority, which did not prevent his another detention until after the coup. One more detention followed in 1933, after another round of riots and police action against Carlist círculos.

Despite his reservations about republicanism-flavored draft of the Catalan autonomy statute Junyent hesitantly decided to support it in the referendum, as "genuine though limited affirmation of Catalonia’s personality". He also silenced the group of Carlist youth – which included his son – when they voiced opposition to the project and made sure that in the party propaganda there was sufficient emphasis on regional Catalan features. However, in fact he remained highly skeptical about secularism of the statute and was anxious that the autonomous region would fell prey to Anarcho-Syndicalism, leaving Carlism trapped in the region ruled by leftist extremism. He tried to counter it by fostering numerous Traditionalist propaganda initiatives, like the spring 1932 Gran Setmana Tradicionalista or by joining conservative institutions like Propaganda Cultural Católica. He also tried to resurrect the alliance with La Lliga, based on the program of defending religion, law and order; the plan did not work and much to his regret, during local Catalan elections of 1932 La Liga preferred to enter alliance with the Radicals. Junyent ran in the campaign himself, but both his personal and the general Carlist results across the region were miserable.

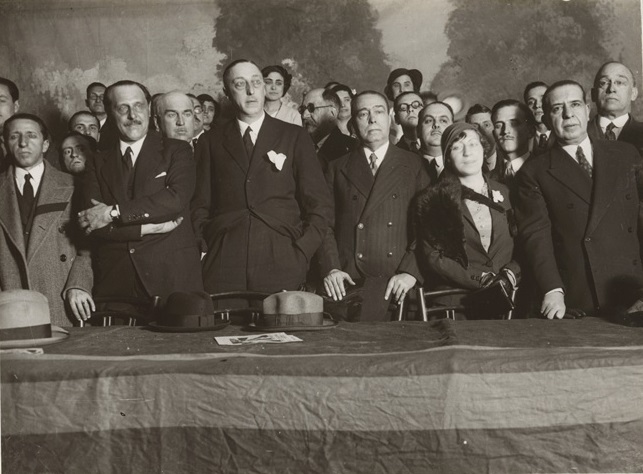
Junyent (centre) during a Traditionalist rally in Catalonia, 1932

Junyent's moderate loyalist strategy, support for autonomy and penchant for alliance with the bourgeoisie La Lliga generated more and more controversy among the Catalan party rank-and-file. It was exacerbated by his comments about a possible fusion between two "ramas borbónicas", even though at the time such concept was contemplated by the late Don Jaime and then by his successor. One of few Carlists leaders "forever", he enjoyed excellent relations with Don Alfonso Carlos and advised him on dynastic issues, yet since 1932 the fronde against him was on the rise, including booing at party rallies. His chief opponents, Conde de Valdellano and José María Cunill Postius, charged him with "concomitancia con los partidos liberales", "colaboracionismo con la política liberal" and "servilismo hacia los liberales"; further charges included Junyent's Catalanism and poor results in 1932 elections. The campaign was well-prepared and some of the opponents travelled to France to win over the claimant. Junyent himself seemed tired and embittered; twice he tried to hand his resignation. His third letter was finally accepted and in June 1933 Junyent ceased as the Catalan jefé.

== Retiree (1933-1936) ==
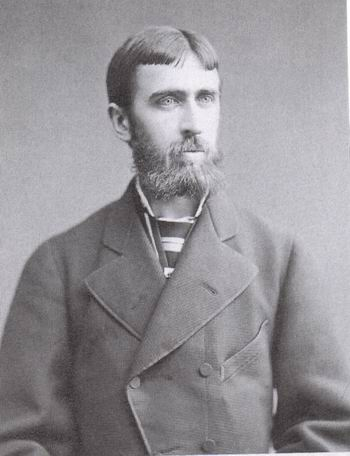
Don Alfonso Carlos

Already in the late 1920s Junyent had to scale down his public engagements due to deteriorating health; no longer the Catalan Carlist political leader, he was gradually withdrawing from active politics altogether. His last known presence at a sitting of the regional party executive is dated at late 1934. His new roles in the party were typical for a retiree, a pundit with advisory voice; in 1933 Don Alfonso Carlos asked him to preside over Junta Consultiva de la Regional de Cataluña, a body which has probably never materialized, and in 1934 he was nominated to Consejo de Cultura Tradicionalista, a board of intellectuals supposed to act as guardians of ideological purity. His rare public engagements were at times related to current politics, e.g. in late 1933 he took part in electoral rally of the Right or in 1934 he joined a rally supposed to commemorate the Carlists killed during the October Revolution. However, Junyent's public appearances were increasingly detached from ongoing events, e.g. in 1935 he participated in a homage session to Juan María Roma.

Following 30 years at the helm of El Correo Catalán, in 1933 Junyent ceased also as director of the newspaper. Circumstances of his departure are not clear; none of the sources consulted clarifies whether he resigned, was forced to resign or got dismissed. It is neither clear who was the owner of El Correo at the time he stepped down. His business engagements were these related to presidency of Banco Catalán Hipotecario, due to its political and personal links known as "el banc dels carlins". Junyent had also to take care of his Can Perevells estate in Piera, which was increasingly plagued by social conflicts with jornaleros contracted to work the fields. Finally, Junyent was involved in works of Societat Económica Barcelonesa d’Amics del Pais and Institut Agricola Catalá de Sant Isidre.

It is not known whether Junyent was in any way involved or even aware of the Carlist conspiracy against the Republic and whether the July coup caught him by surprise; one source claims that by the time he had already withdrawn from politics. There are confusing accounts on his whereabouts after the coup. According to one source he remained in Barcelona and participated in Banco Catalán executive session; he filed his resignation over issues related to compensation for an employee who suffered during the turmoil; the letter was not accepted. According to another, he went into hiding. One more source claims that a militia patrol arrived at his home to arrest him, but they reportedly resigned due to Junyent's poor health. Shortly afterwards he suffered from fatal heart attack having learnt that his successor as the Carlist Catalan jefé, Tomás Cayla, had been beheaded by the Republicans. One day later another FAI patrol came either to detain or to execute him; they concluded the mission only when led to a room, where the corpse of Junyent was being prepared for funeral. Various accounts of this episode differ.

== See also ==
- El Correo Catalán

== Footnotes ==
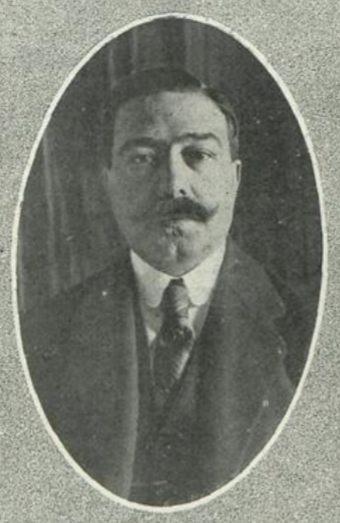
Junyent around 1918
