= Erasmo Janer Gironella =

Spanish entrepreneur and politician (1833–1911)

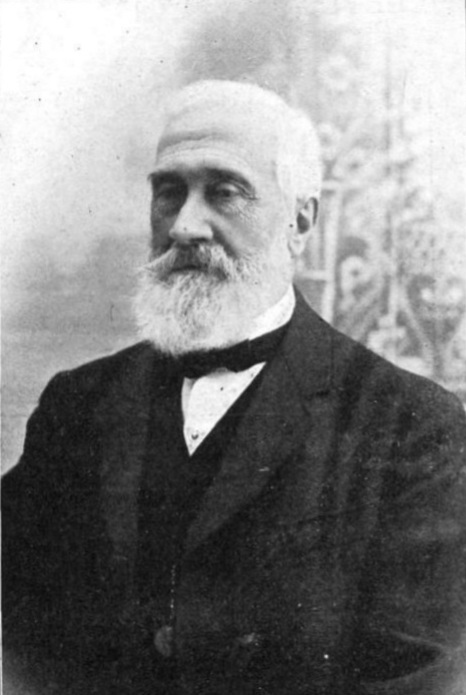
- Born: José Erasmo Janer Gironella; 1833; Barcelona, Spain
- Died: 1911 (aged 77–78); Barcelona, Spain
- Known for: politician
- Political party: Carlism

José Erasmo Janer Gironella (1833-1911) was a Spanish entrepreneur and politician. As a businessman he is considered to have been a member of the textile-industry-related Catalan bourgeoisie, which enjoyed the peak of its power in the mid-19th century; Janer represented this group during its declining phase. Politically he earned his name as a Carlist and headed the Catalan branch of the party between 1902 and 1910.

== Family and youth ==
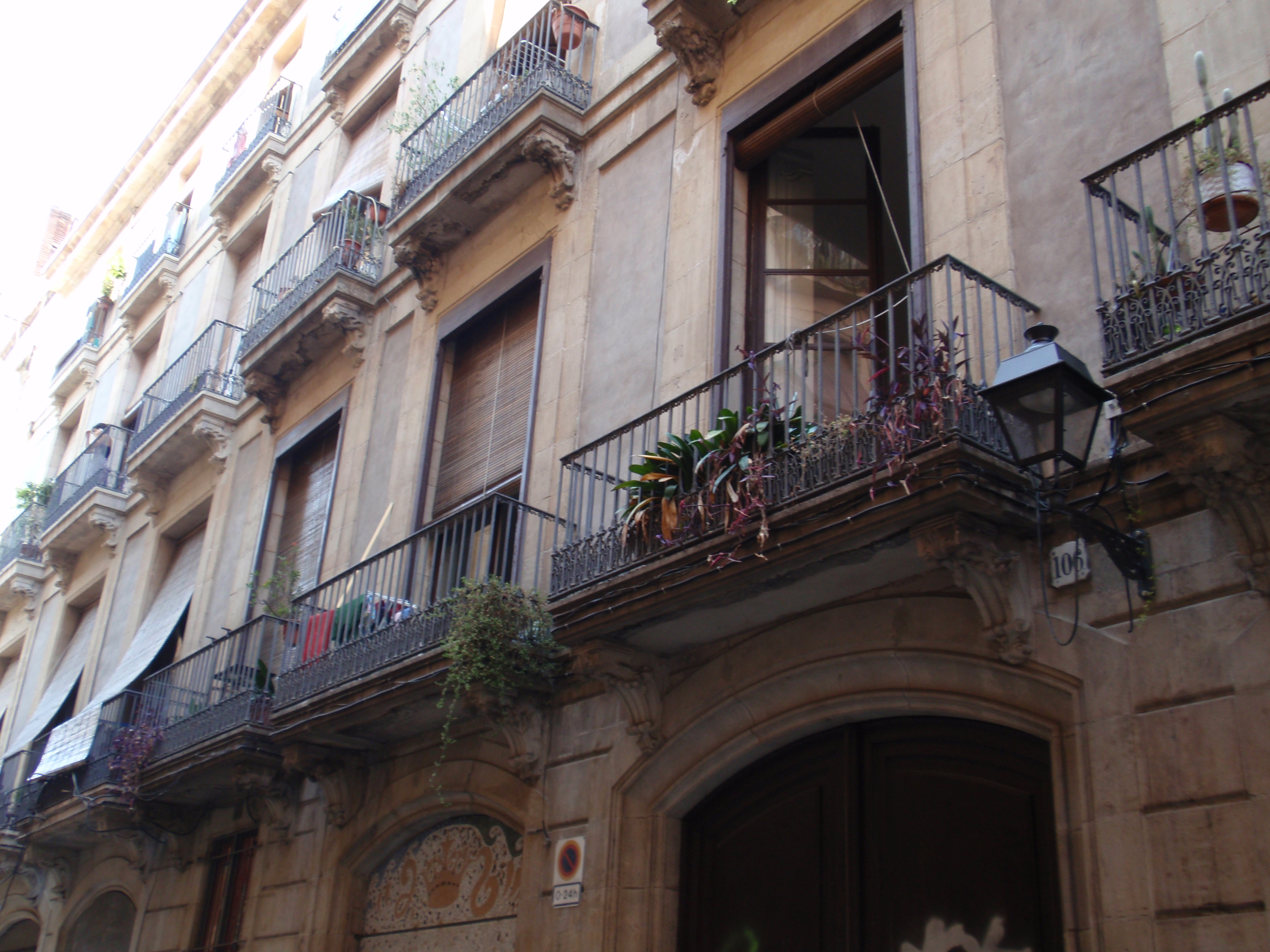
Ca l'Erasme, Barcelona

Some scholars consider the Janer family past an illustration of social history in Catalonia, its rise and decline demonstrating patterns of change within the local ruling strata. Erasmo's paternal grandfather Domingo Janer Sunyer (1762-1807) was son to a provincial doctor and commenced his career as a petty merchant from Esparreguera; rising to prosperity, he was ennobled in 1795. He married heiress to an emergent Gónima textile fortune; both died prematurely. Their only son and the future father of Erasmo, Erasmo Janer Gónima (1791-1862), inherited the hugely successful business in 1821; at that time it was crowned with the largest European textile factory which employed some 1,200 workers. Himself representative of a new strata of commerce and industry tycoons which started to surpass landed aristocracy and old urban bourgeoisie, in the mid-19th century Janer Gónima brought the family to business and political climax. Member of executive boards of countless economic organizations, he held key positions in municipal administration, served as alcalde of Barcelona in 1846 and as a provincial deputy in the 1850s. In the mid-19th century he shut down the textile factory and re-focused the family business on finance, railways and commerce.

In 1813 Janer Gónima married Josefa Gironella Ayguals, daughter to another Barcelona textile industry tycoon. The couple had 5 or 7 children; out of two sons, it was José Erasmo who became heir to the family wealth. At unspecified time though probably in the 1840s he frequented the Piarist college of St. Anthony in Barcelona, to complete education while studying law at Universidad de Barcelona and graduating most likely in the mid-1850s. Gradually getting engaged in running the family business, in 1864 José Erasmo married Dolores Milá de la Roca Vilaseca; her family, also ennobled merchants, became landowners rather than engaged in potentially profitable but risky urban ventures. Basking in inherited opulence the couple settled in the Janer family residence in Barcelona, in the iconic building known as Ca l'Erasme.

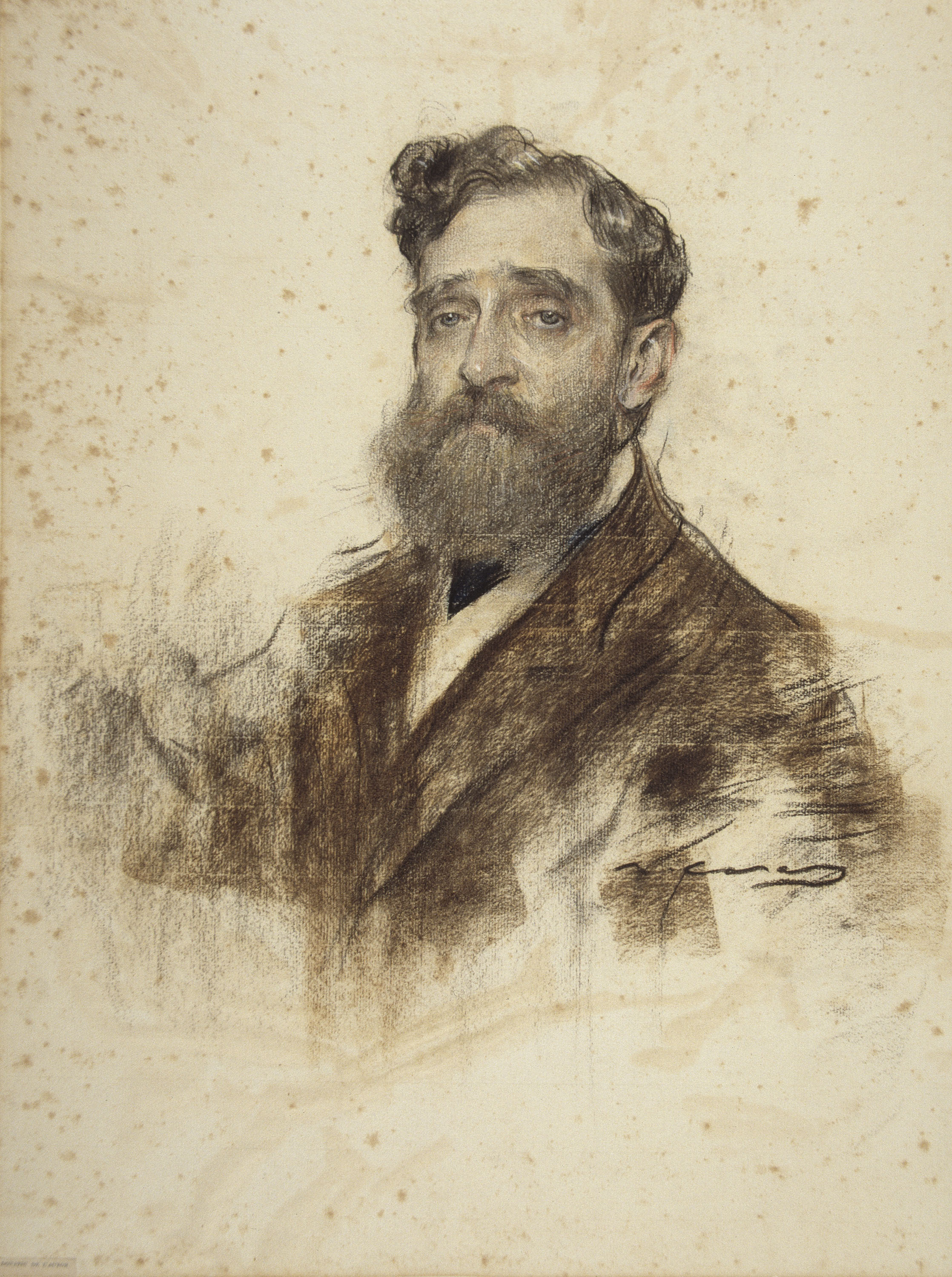
Ignacio Janer Milà

José Erasmo and Dolores had 7 children, though only two of them married: the second oldest son and the family heir Ignacio Janer Milá de la Roca became a locally known historian and writer, while Mercedes wed a Carlist politician Dalmacio Iglesias. Another daughter María de los Angeles became a Carlist propagandist. José Erasmo and Dolores had 5 grandchildren; both grandsons were youth Carlist activists during the Second Republic years and requeté volunteers during the Civil War. The older one, Erasmo Janer Duran, was executed by the Republicans; the younger one, Enrique Janer Duran, survived the war to become a lawyer; since the early 1940s till the late 1970s he held various mid-range positions in the Barcelona city council, from secretary of the ayuntamiento to teniente auditor, jefé de sección and head of the transport department. As neither Erasmo nor Enrique had sons, the Janer line has extinguished. The nephews of José Erasmo, José María and Erasme Lasarte Janer, became known in local Catalan realm respectively as a writer and as a painter.

== Conservative to Carlist (1864-1876) ==
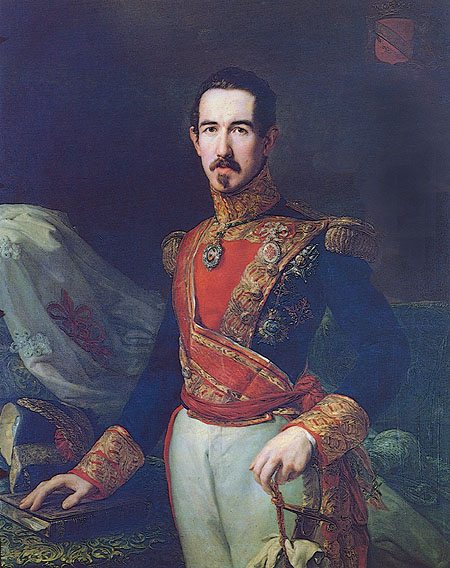
Juan de la Pezuela

As heir to the former mayor of Barcelona and son to one of the most potent men in the city Janer was destined to become a public figure, yet political preferences of his ancestors are not entirely clear. Historians note that as tycoons of new bourgeoisie the Janers and the Gónimas were Liberals, while the Gironellas were even related to the revolutionary exaltado version of Spanish liberalism. One source claims that during the First Carlist War his father joined the liberal Barcelona juntas while another one states that in the mid-1840s he was a Traditionalist, which might point to not an unusual conservative evolution of certain section of the Moderados. One author notes that Janer himself sort of neared Traditionalist outlook during his academic years, yet his first public engagements did not demonstrate such a penchant. In the late 1850s and early 1860s he was noted for engagement in various institutions related to local business, recorded as member of Instituto Agrícola Catalan and an insurance company La Providencia or sitting in the board of Asociación de Socorros y Protección a la Clase Obrera y Jornalera and in Junta de Patronato of his Barcelona borough. One source claims he initially practiced as a lawyer.

In the mid-1860s Janer was first noted running for public office, as propietario and haciendario competing for the concejal post in the Barcelona ayuntamiento; there is no confirmation of his success. It seems that during final years of the Isabelline monarchy he neared the entourage of the then capitán general of Catalonia and the Conservative politician, Juan de la Pezuela; Janer used to address him in public homage letters and was nominated by Pezuela to the last Isabelline city council, where he was sitting as the youngest concejal until the body was dissolved during the 1868 revolution.

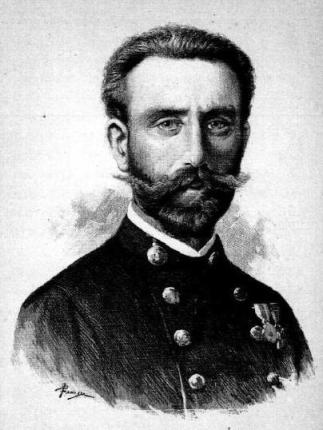
Tirso Olazábal

One author claims that Janer passed from Conservative to Carlist position when faced with the revolutionary developments of the late 1860s. Some sources maintain he fielded his candidature in elections to the Constituent Assembly of 1869 and indeed in 1871 he was already reported as nominated by the regional Carlist junta as their representative in the Cortes elections from Sant Feliu de Llobregat, the bid which proved unsuccessful. In 1872 Janer became president of Círculo Católico-Monárquico in Barcelona and entered the provincial party executive, noted as member of the Barcelona Junta Provincial Católico-Monárquica. In the council he was sitting with his father-in-law, Manuel Milá de la Roca, and forged the lifelong friendship with the junta leader and later Catalan Carlist leader, Luis de Llauder y Dalmases. Following outbreak of the Third Carlist War Janer found himself the target of Republican persecutions and had to flee the city a number of times. Eventually with his family he sought exile in France and settled in Saint Jean de Luz. According to one source he joined a small team, led by Tírso de Olazábal and busy procuring arms for the Carlist troops; it is likely that taking advantage of his wealth, Janer contributed financially.

== In the second row (1877-1888) ==
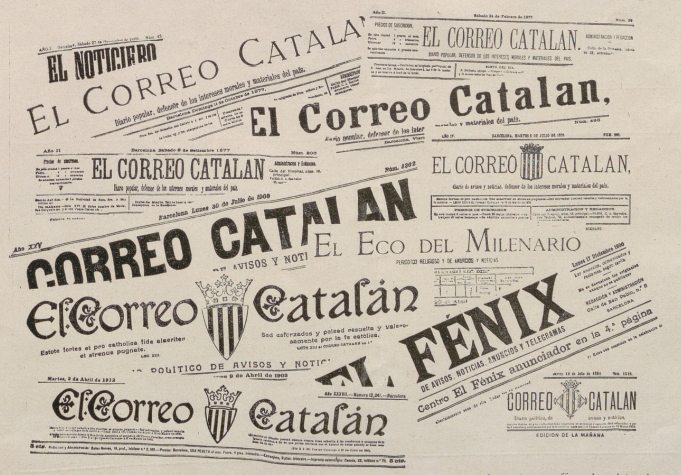
El Correo Catalan logotypes

It is not clear whether Janer's massive property was embargoed during the war, whether he suffered any other persecutions and when he returned to Barcelona after the Carlist military defeat. A number of sources point vaguely to the late 1870s when claiming that together with Milá de la Roca and Llauder Janer was among co-founders of a new Carlist daily which would remain in print for the following 60 years, El Correo Catalan. In 1879 he entered the Barcelona ayuntamiento yet duration of his term is not known; except an 1888 spell in Junta Municipal it proved to be a unique Janer's episode in official administration. In the 1880s he was noted rather for looking after his family enterprises, especially in Caja de Ahorros. However, some scholars claim that he demonstrated neither interest nor skills in commercial activities and that during his tenure the family business went into decline; some go as far as to claim that to sustain the Carlist cause he kept selling off his private property or even that he ruined his fortune with the legitimist zeal. Janer was also known for engagement in numerous public initiatives, often flavored with charity: he held executive or presidential positions in Junta de Obra, Junta de la Beneficiencia in his Nuestra Señora del Carmen parish, Real Archicofradía de la Virgén de los Dolores, Junta Local de Salvament de Náufrags and various makeshift committees, e.g. the body assisting victims of the 1885 earthquake in Andalusia.

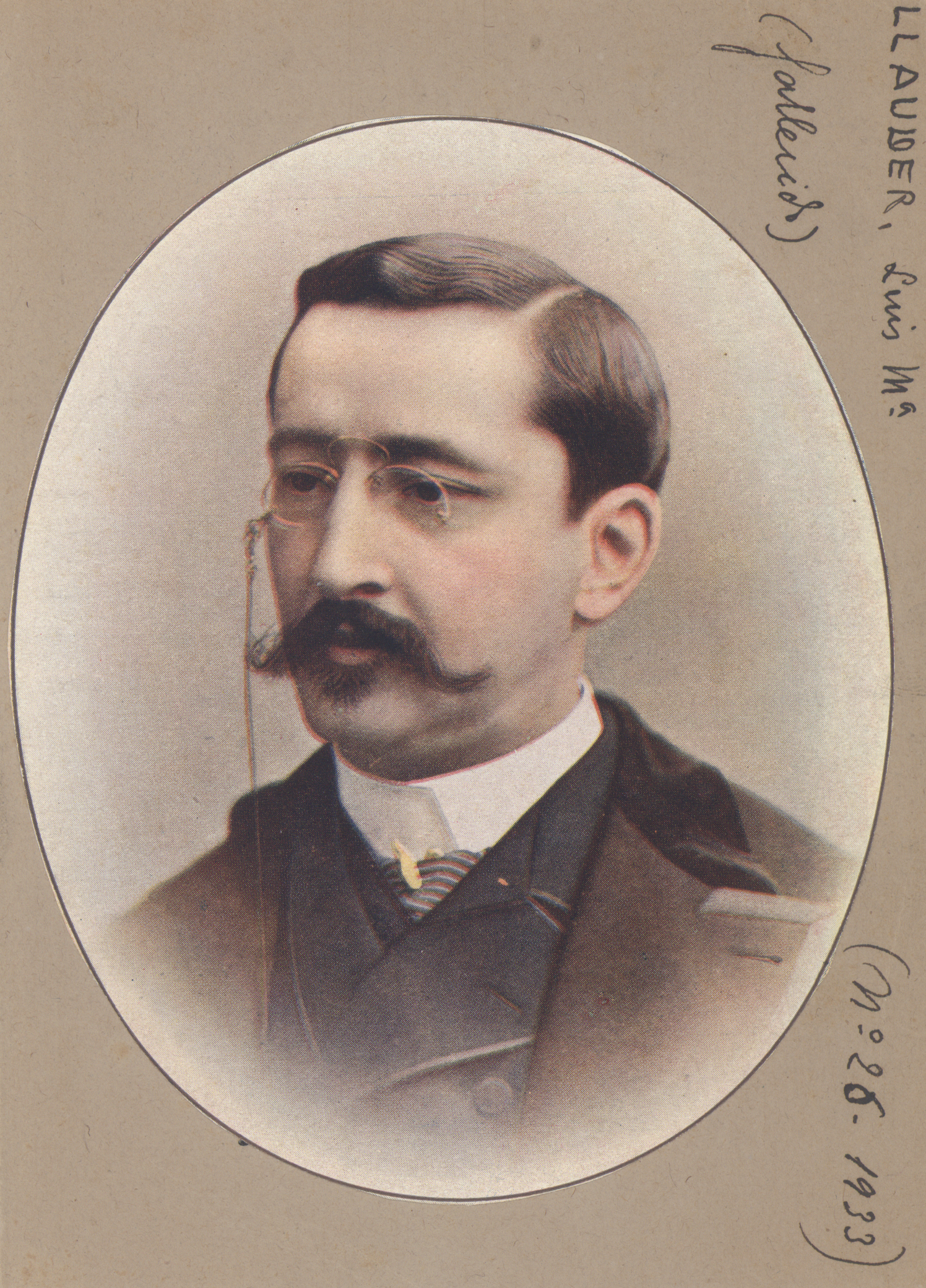
Lluís Llauder Dalmases

In the 1880s Carlism did not exist as organized structures present in the Spanish public life; the movement languished as a set of loose quasi-political initiatives flavored with Traditionalist spirit and intransigent religiosity. Part of this strategy was mobilizing support by means of mass pilgrimages; Janer contributed as member of the Barcelona Junta Organizativa branch, which co-ordinated the 1882 romería to Rome. Adhering to the same line he used to sign various public letters denouncing perceived injustice to the Catholics and secular course of the government, e.g. the entire Janer family subscribed to an 1883 document which protested curtailment of Catholic rights; in 1884 he emerged as leader of the Catalan branch of Asociación Católica. Stress on religious features, focus on Traditionalist values and de-emphasizing of dynastical threads was very much the vision of the Carlist political leader Candido Nocedal and later his son Ramón. Janer seemed on perfect terms with both despite the fact that the Nocedalistas, known also as Integrists, were increasingly on collision course with the claimant Don Carlos; as late as in 1886 Janer took part in a homage banquet honoring Ramón Nocedal. However, when in 1888 the Integrists broke away from Carlism to form their own Traditionalist organization Janer decided to stay loyal to his king; in 1889 he was already lambasted by the Integrists as the sidekick of Llauder.

== Deputy leader (1889-1901) ==
Carlist standard

Following the Integrist secession Carlism abandoned its quasi-political format of the 1880s and assumed a decisively more active political stance; the nationwide structures started to emerge, initially styled as committees celebrating 1,400 years since the Conversion of Recaredo. In Catalonia the organization was headed by Llauder, yet Janer – together with Manuel de Torrents – was nominated its vice-president, effectively the second-in-command in the regional party infrastructure. However, his contribution to Carlist buildup seems meager. Though Carlist candidates started to take part in electoral campaigns and under the new nationwide leadership of Marqués de Cerralbo the movement took shape of an organized modern political party, there is little information on Janer's public activity in the early 1890s. Despite consolidation and growth of Catalan Carlism under the regional leadership of Llauder, Janer neither stood as candidate in elections nor was recorded as active in supporting electoral campaigns. While de Cerralbo was striving to implement a new formula of mass mobilization Janer seemed attached rather to old-style patterns and at best took part in closed-door party feasts, like the one in 1893. His popular initiatives stuck to the pilgrimage format, e.g. when organizing workers' romería to Rome in 1894 or signing homage letter to the papal nuncio; the document protested the governmental secularization policy.

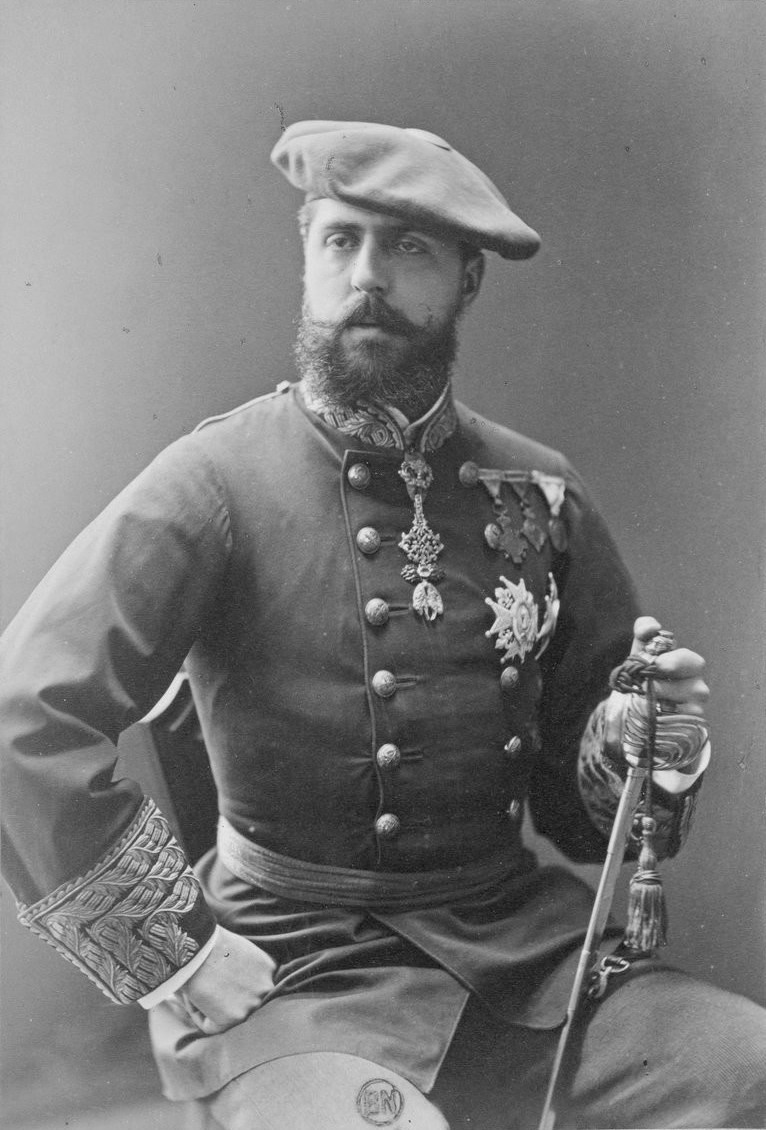
Don Carlos

In 1895 Janer was officially confirmed by de Cerralbo as vice-president of the Catalan Carlist organization, yet he still remained in the shadow of Llauder. He was barely mentioned when new party círculos in the region were being opened, typically noted when presiding over official banquets or entertaining royal Carlist figures, e.g. the second wife of the claimant Berthe do Rohan, who visited Barcelona in 1896. Though historiographic studies either on Catalan or nationwide Carlism of the 1890s barely mention his name, de Cerralbo was apparently satisfied with Janer's contribution to the cause; Jefe Delegado addressed him with effusive letters of gratitude and thanked him for electoral efforts; press of the era provides little evidence of such support. Actually, it seems that in the late 1890s the Catalan Carlism was vibrant yet increasingly leaderless and disorganized. Since 1898 due to his poor health Llauder's leadership became largely theoretical, while the movement was plagued by personal squabbles, emerging social radicalism, urban pistolerismo, Catalanist sympathies and insurrectional currents. None of the sources consulted mentions Janer when discussing the local 1899-1900 Carlist revolts in Catalonia. The press noted that in the very first years of the 20th century the Catalan Carlism was led by 3 competitive juntas: 1) the old one headed by Llauder, 2) the new one appointed by recently nominated Jefe Delegado Matiás Barrio and headed by Duque de Solferino, and 3) the one associated with general Moore, headed by Janer; this claim is not confirmed by other sources. Following the death of Llauder and despite rumors pointing to Solferino, following Janer's visit to Don Carlos' residence in Venice in 1902 the claimant nominated him the new Catalan leader.

== Jefe (1902-1910) ==
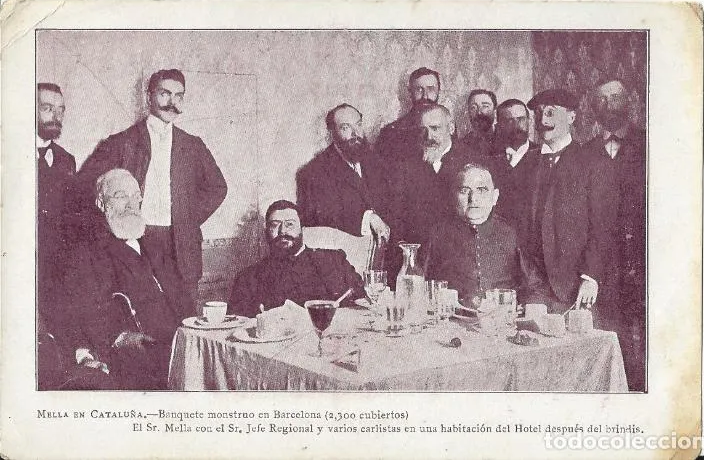
Janer (sitting 1fL) with de Mella

Janer's tenure fell on a period when Catalan Carlism was challenged by massive social and political change, the decade which shifted the region's centre of gravity from rural traditional hinterland to the coastal strip, dominated by new urban classes. The rising Catalanist and anti-establishment tide gave rise to Solidaridad Catalana; on the one hand the Carlists were attracted by its opposition to the Restoration regime, on the other they were estranged by Republican, nationalist and secularist features of the alliance. Janer, who in 1903-1905 limited himself to making appointments and presiding over party feasts, in 1906 gave in to the pressure of pro-Solidaridad Carlists like Solferino and Junyent and permitted access to the pact. His key concern was that only authorized individuals were allowed to stand on joint electoral lists and that the move did not go beyond a temporary tactical cooperation. Faced with anti-Solidaridad opposition in the party ranks he enforced discipline yet it seems he kept vacillating himself. Carlist access was rewarded with great success in the 1907 elections but it seems that Janer had few regrets when the alliance fell apart in 1908, even though debates persisted until 1909.

Another problem Janer had to face as a regional leader was the insurrectional tide, rising among the Catalan Carlists. Though the 1900 preparations boiled down to few isolated attempts some sections of the party kept gearing up for a violent overthrow of the regime. Janer called for discipline and tried to marginalize the radicals; when in 1906 they staged a local revolt in Martorell, easily crushed by the government forces, Janer first disauthorised the action and then expulsed the insurrectionists from the party, again in full agreement with the claimant. However, the dissent was mounting, fuelled also by personal squabbles and issues related to tactical alliances with the Alfonsists; to enforce discipline at times Janer opted for dissolution of municipal or even provincial party jefaturas. A few local party heavyweights like Tamarít grumbled against Janer and some, like Solferino, resigned in protest.

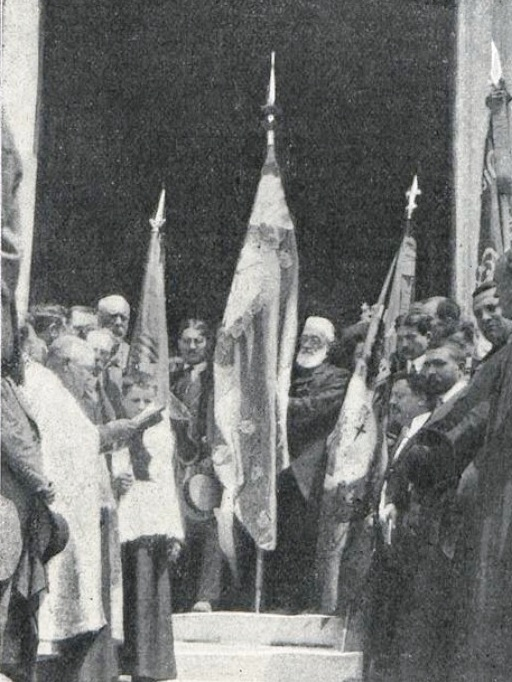
Janer at a Carlist feast in Vich, 1908

Janer seemed overwhelmed by problems and apparent decomposition of the party in Catalonia; he first tried to step down in 1906, but his resignation was not accepted by the claimant; in 1908 he again handed over his resignation, also to no avail. Contemporary press noted that Janer was a great Christian, grand citizen and by all means an extraordinary person, but neither a good leader nor an impressive politician, tending to inactivity and with scarce faith in the cause. He is not recorded as engaged in heated debates shaping the nationwide Carlist politics. In 1910 Janer eventually got his resignation accepted by the new Carlist king Don Jaime, who appointed Solferino his successor. The reason quoted was Janer's poor health and indeed it seems that his life force deteriorated, especially after the 1910 death of his wife. Following resignation he mostly withdrew into privacy and in public remained engaged only in family business, until death performing managerial duties in Caja de Ahorros.

== See also ==
- Traditionalism (Spain)
- Carlism
- Casa Erasme de Gònima
- Erasme de Gònima i Passarell
- Ignasi de Janer i Milà de la Roca
