= Manuela Janer Cabanyes =

Spanish businessperson

- Born: 1696
- Died: 1760 (aged 63–64)
- Occupations: Businesswoman; investor
- Known for: One of the most successful businesswomen in 18th‑century Spain and Catalonia
- Spouse: Francesc Baldrich (m. 1716; d. 1748)
- Children: Anton Baldrich

Manuela Janer Cabanyes (1696–1760), was a Spanish businessperson.

She was born in a merchant family: her father and brothers owned a hotel and traded in wool and textiles. In 1716, she married Francesc Baldrich, a successful merchant in commercial investments. Upon the death of her husband in 1748, Manuela Janer Cabanyes took over his business. She invested in buildings and had factories built in Valls. As was the custom for pious people in Spain, she also made large donations to religious institutions and charitable funds. In 1756, she made her son Anton Baldrich her partner on his 25fth birthday. She is noted as one of the most successful businesswomen in 18th-century Spain and particularly in the history of Catalonia.
