= Luis María de Llauder y de Dalmases =

Spanish politician & lawyer (1837–1902)

Luis M. de Llauder y Dalmases
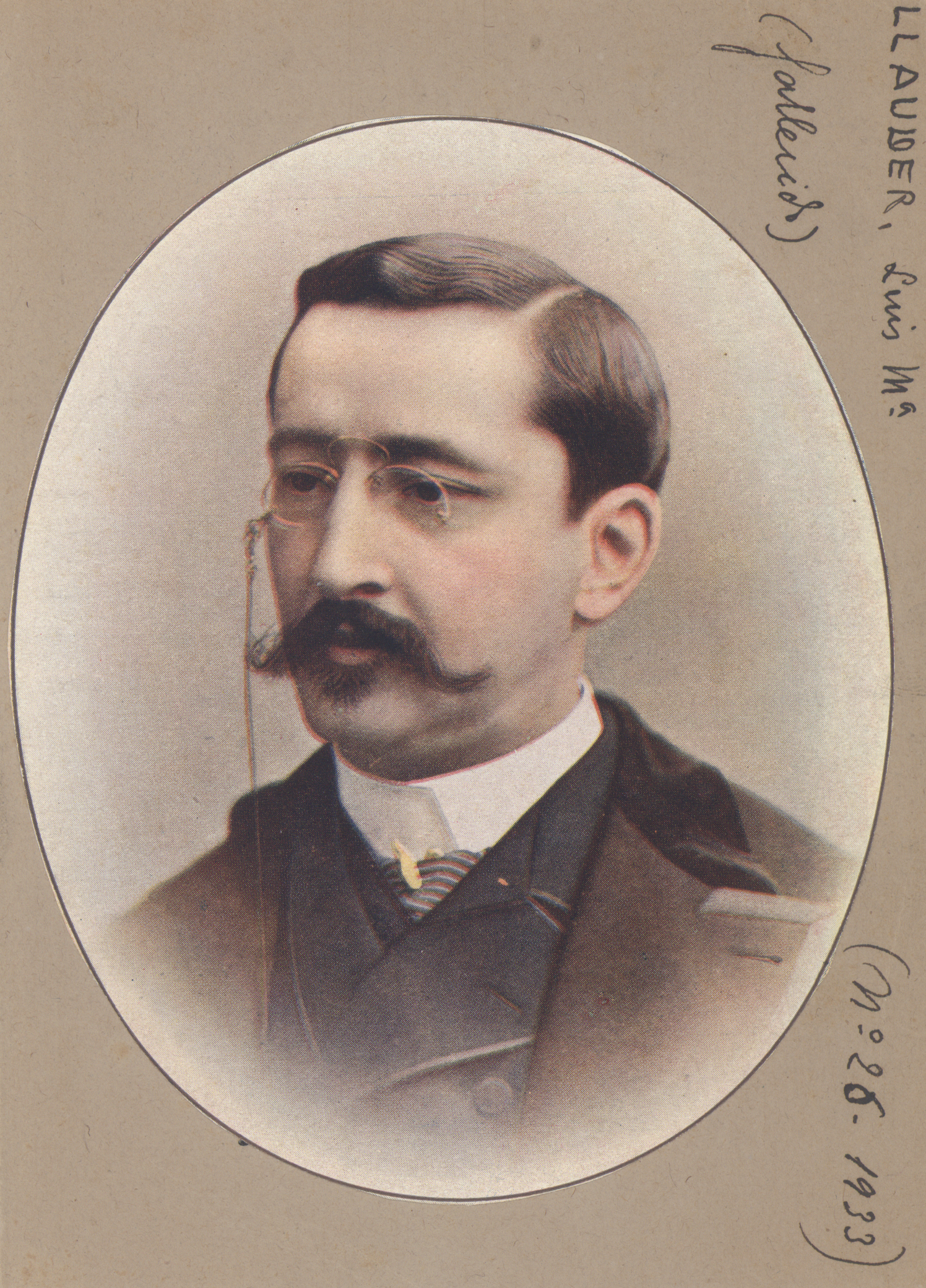
- Born: Luis Llauder Dalmases; 1837; Madrid
- Died: 1902 (aged 64–65); Barcelona
- Occupation: publisher
- Known for: politician
- Political party: Carlism

Luis Gonzaga María Antonio Carlos Ramón Miguel de Llauder y de Dalmases, de Freixas, de Bufalá y de Camín, 1st marquis of Valldeix (1837–1902) was a Spanish Catholic publisher and a Carlist politician. He is known as leader of Catalan Carlism of the late nineteenth century. He is also recognized as founder and the moving spirit behind Barcelona-based Catholic media initiatives, especially a publishing house, a daily Correo Catalán, and a weekly La Hormiga de Oro.

== Family and youth ==
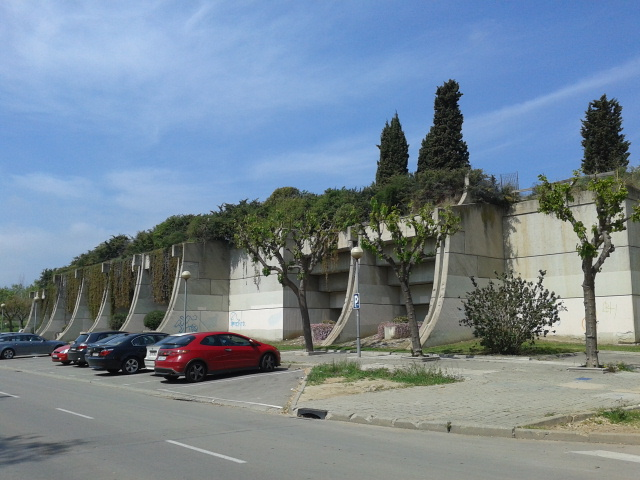
Torre Llauder used to stand here

The Llauder family was first recorded in the late 15th century, its representatives noted as blacksmiths based in the Catalan town of Argentona. In course of the next two centuries the family grew into prominence and wealth, accumulating a number of estates in Mataró and Barcelona; since mid-17th century its senior was honorary citizen of the Catalan capital. In the late 18th century the family built an iconic Mataró mansion known as Torre Llauder and kept living there interchanging with the residence at intersection of the Hèrcules and Arlet streets in Barcelona. Luis' great-grandfather, José Antonio Llauder y Duran, commenced industrial activities upon receiving concession to exploit water springs; despite damages suffered during the Peninsular War, the business was developed further on by his son José Francisco Llauder y Camín, who died in 1824 already as the first taxpayer of Mataró.

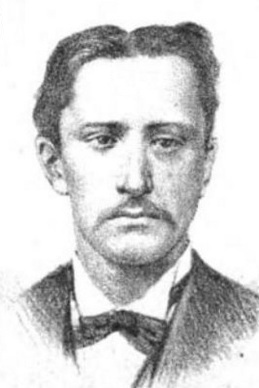
young Llauder

José Francisco's son and the father of Luis, Ramón de Llauder y Freixes (1807–1870), inherited the family wealth and prestige. He fell in love with María Mercedes de Dalmases y de Bufalà (died 1885), also a Catalan native of Sant Martí Sesgueioles, descendant to a wealthy bourgeoisie family. The couple married in 1837 and initially settled in Madrid, but they soon moved to the Llauder residence in Barcelona; Ramon remained the first taxpayer of Mataró. Apart from integration and further development of the family businesses, he made his name as a lawyer and became member of Tribunal Supremo. He is known as a fervent Catholic who donated large sums to the Church, including financing of a newly set up Poor Clares convent. Ramon demonstrated interest in charity, further developed also by Luis, e.g. founding and financing a school for the poor.

Ramon and María had 6 children, except Luis all of them daughters; they were brought up in fervently Catholic ambience. One of them, Pilar, became nun of the Handmaids of the Sacred Heart of Jesus order. It is not clear where the young Luis received his schooling; he obtained bachillerato in 1851. He then enrolled at the Civil and Canon law faculty of the Universitat de Barcelona, graduating as licenciado in 1858; one source claims he received technical education and graduated as engineer. As he inherited a real estate fortune and the industry enterprises, it is not clear whether he has ever practiced as a lawyer. He has never married and had no children. He was grandnephew of Manuel de Llauder y Camín, first Viscount de Llauder and Marqués del Valle de Ribas. A little known poet of the early 20th century, Lorenzo de Llauder y de Bonilla, was his distant relative.

== Early public activity ==
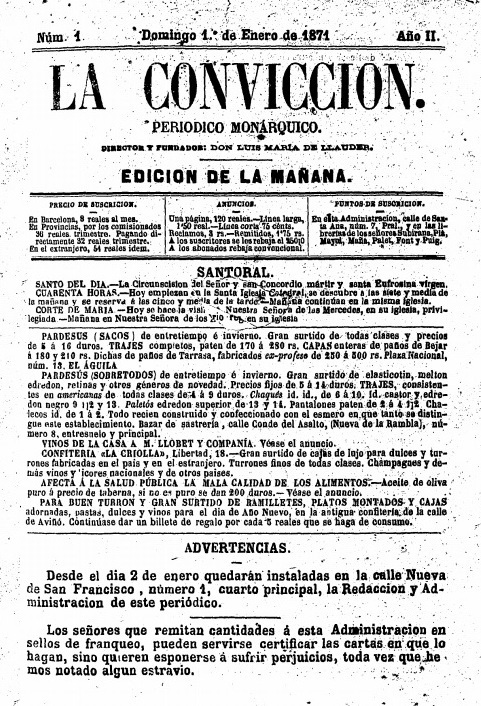
La Convicción

There is little information on Llauder's public activity in the 1860s. He was certainly active in various Catholic groupings; having inherited from his father vivid interest in social issues and a penchant for charity, in 1863 he was acknowledged as engaged in Caridad Cristiana, a Barcelona philanthropic institution specializing in education; in the early 1864 he rose to deputy treasurer of the organization. Llauder was also noted as active in regional realm in-between economy and public management: in 1865 he was secretary of comisión organizadora preparing an agricultural exposition in Mataró; within this body he represented the proprietors. There is a source which claims that in his youth he practiced as a lawyer, though the information is not confirmed elsewhere. He was probably engaged also in the family business; at unspecified time and under his guidance the number of family operated watermills rose from 2 to 5; he also upgraded some of them by mounting auxiliary steam engines.

It is not clear when Llauder commenced his lifelong career of a publisher and a journalist. One author maintains that it was "shortly after" graduation when he tried his hand in letters, starting co-operation with local periodicals. The first titles named are popular Catholic reviews La Sociedad Católica, El Amigo del Pueblo and El Criterio Católico, and the time is specified as "second half of the 1860s". It seems that at that time he was formatted as a militant Catholic author rather than a partisan of any specific party. His opinion on politics of the era, especially on the crumbling rule of Isabel II, is not known. It was only the Glorious Revolution of 1868 and declaration of the First Spanish Republic that triggered Llauder's political career.

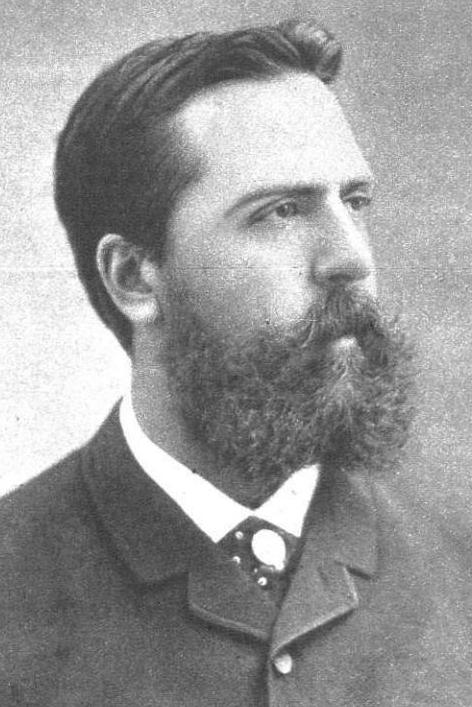
young Carlos VII

There were no known Carlist antecedents in Llauder's family. Political views of his father are unclear, while his paternal uncle, Carlos de Llauder y Freixes, was well established in the Isabelline system as a Partido Moderado politician and a Cortes deputy. It was rather the brother of his paternal grandfather, Manuel de Llauder y Camín, who gained nationwide recognition as a Carlist foe; when capitán general of Catalonia he made his name for engineering anti-Carlist repressions during and after the First Carlist War. Hence, it is not clear how Llauder approached the Carlists in the late 1860s. Later party propaganda claimed that it was his bright intelligence that made him conclude, somewhat against the family background, that Traditionalism was the only way forward. This became evident in his 1869 booklet, El desenlace de la revolución españoIa. The work compared regimes of liberal monarchy, republic and traditionalist monarchy. Stemming mostly from Catholic principles, it declared Traditionalism the only viable option, advocating leadership of the Carlist claimant Carlos VII. Desenlace was focused on politics; the work by no means endorsed violence, the position that Llauder was to maintain through all later life. According to his own later accounts, the book was the first attempt "to fly the Carlist standard in Catalonia" during the Sexenio Democrático.

== Approach to, Third Carlist War and aftermath ==
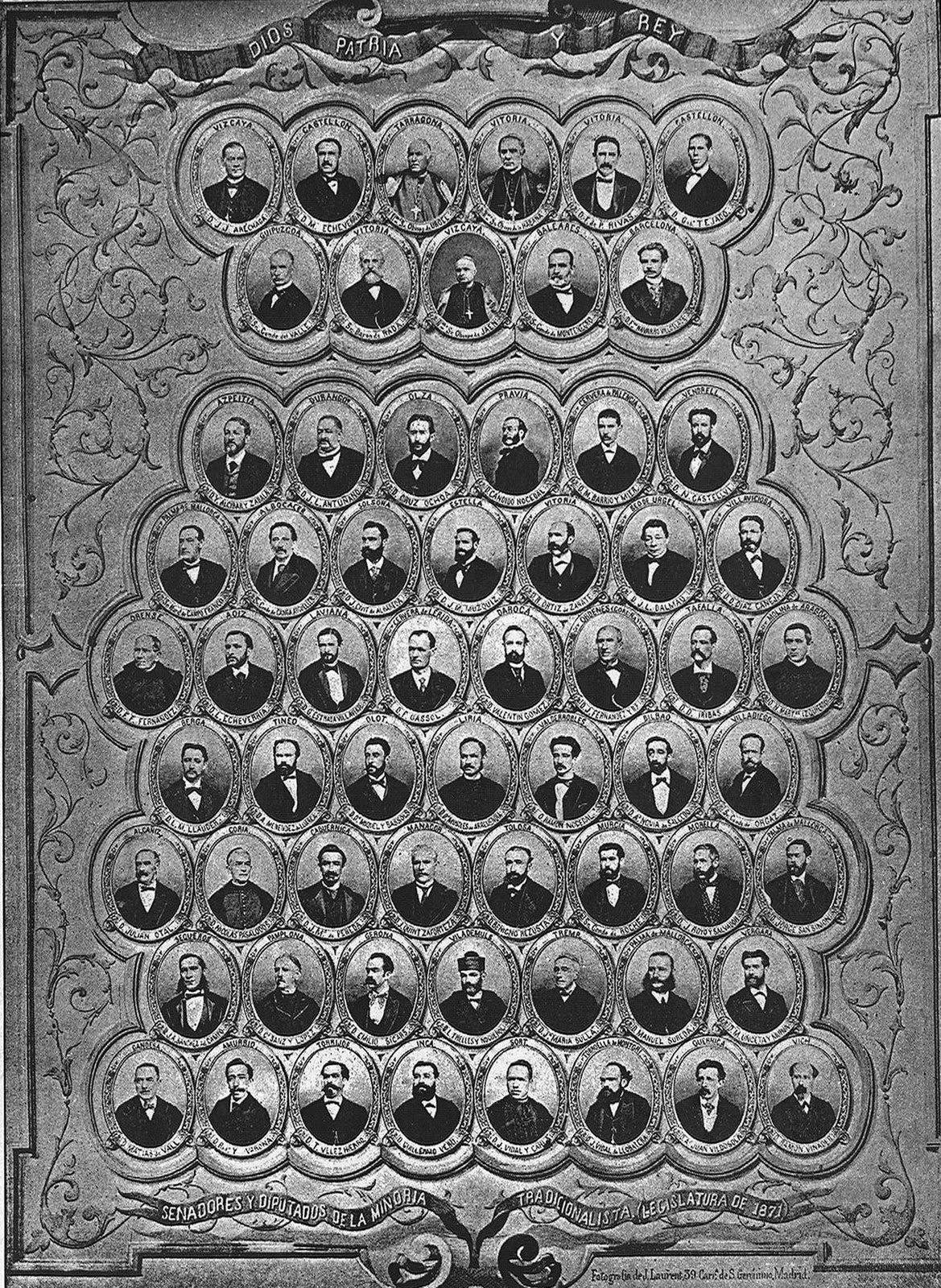
Llauder and Carlist MPs

Desenlace earned Llauder his name in Catalan public discourse. He was welcomed in Asociación Católico-Monárquica, an agglutinatory force attracting far-Right opposition. The formation was an alliance of neo-Catholics, Conservatives and Carlists; though Llauder's non-belligerent stance was similar to that of the neos, a contemporary scholar clearly identifies him as a Carlist. In the supplementary 1870 elections to Cortes Constituentes Llauder appeared on candidatura católico-monárquica in his native district of Vich. When elected he joined the 23-member Carlist minority. In the successive 1871 campaign he ran on the same ticket from Berga, elected with 97% of all votes cast. In the spring of 1872 he again stood in Berga; though initially reported victorious, in unclear circumstances he was finally declared defeated.

In the early 1870s Llauder's career of a publisher was already in full swing. Around 1870 he founded with his own money a Barcelona-based daily La Convicción, acting also as a manager and editor-in-chief until the title was closed in 1873. Though the paper demonstrated clear Traditionalist leaning, its political strategy appear confusing. On the one hand Llauder demonstrated much flexibility. In 1871 he advocated alliance of all opposition groupings; the call raised eyebrows of those - like Navarro Villoslada - who were surprised at having been encouraged to join ranks with the radical republicans. On the other hand, Llauder demonstrated a doctrinaire position when lambasting the neo-Catholic José María Quadrado by calling him a liberal disciple of Chateaubriand. Scholars present different views on Llauder's position versus amalgamation with the neo-Catholics; some claim he opposed it and some claim he himself approached them. At that time he was already considered "prestigioso periodista".

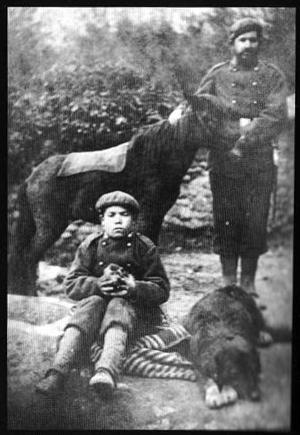
Carlist subjects, 1870s

Shortly before outbreak of the Third Carlist War Llauder was an eminent party figure in Catalonia, rising to presidency of the Barcelona Ateneo Católico-monárquica and Junta Provincial Católico-monárquica. Since 1870 he was living intermittently in Spain and abroad, mostly in the Swiss Vevey, where he accompanied the claimant and his brother Don Alfonso Carlos. At the outbreak of hostilities as a renowned propagandist he felt endangered by republican militants and did not return to Spain. His exact war record is not clear, though he probably did not take part in hostilities. At least temporarily he accompanied Carlos VII in Gipuzkoa; in mid-1873 the press reported him as nominated secretary to Alfonso Carlos, though later he was noted as resident in the French Prats-de-Mollo, active within a group of recovering Carlist combatants. No further information is available; one scholar summarizes his contribution to the Carlist war effort as "modestíssima".

Following the Carlist defeat Llauder did not return to Spain. In 1876 the claimant nominated him secretary to Junta de Generales, a rather ineffective makeshift Carlist executive set up by Carlos VII prior to his departure to America. Some sources claim that until 1878 he permanently resided in Rome, acting as sort of a Carlist diplomatic envoy to Vatican, though contemporary press noticed his taking part in the 1877 pilgrimage to Zaragoza.

== Nocedalista ==
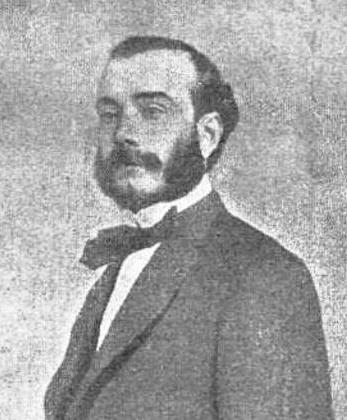
Candido Nocedal

Back in Spain Llauder resumed public activity in the Carlist realm. It was very much pursued along the lines set up by Candido Nocedal, who intended to format the party as focused on religious issues and vehemently opposed to the emerging Restauración regime. Already shortly after the military defeat Llauder joined Nocedal in a plot, aimed against Junta de Generales, and served as liaison with a number of distinguished Carlist figures. Once Nocedal was appointed the official jefe delegado in 1879, Llauder emerged as top Catalan exponent of his political line, known as Integrism. Since key nocedalista means of mobilization were public events styled as Catholic feasts, especially pilgrimages, in 1879 Llauder became member of Junta Directiva organizing another massive excursion to Rome. As initial plan did not work out, in 1882 he headed Barcelona branch of junta organizadora engineering the next attempt, and once political nature of the enterprise became evident, he was confronted by the Barcelona bishop José María Urquinaona.

Nocedal and his followers envisioned Carlism as a loose movement, its direction set by a wide range of publications; in 1875 in Madrid they founded a daily which was to become an icon of Traditionalist press, El Siglo Futuro. Llauder followed suit in Barcelona, where in 1878 he took over Correo Catalán. Correo started to serve as the principal Integrist tribune in Catalonia; it published articles of key Catholic intransigents like Félix Sardà y Salvany, joined El Siglo Futuro in war against other Carlist publications like Le Fé, representing competitive religious and political vision, and co-engineered campaign against the Pidalistas, who decided to join political structures of the regime. His belligerency cost Llauder legal action and incarceration sentence; Correo, suspended for 45 days, was at that time replaced by ephemeral El Noticiero. Soon Llauder threw himself into publishing activity altogether: in 1883 he set up an intransigent Catholic weekly, in 1885 he opened a bookstore, and in 1887 he complemented the business by founding a publishing house, all named La Hormiga de Oro.

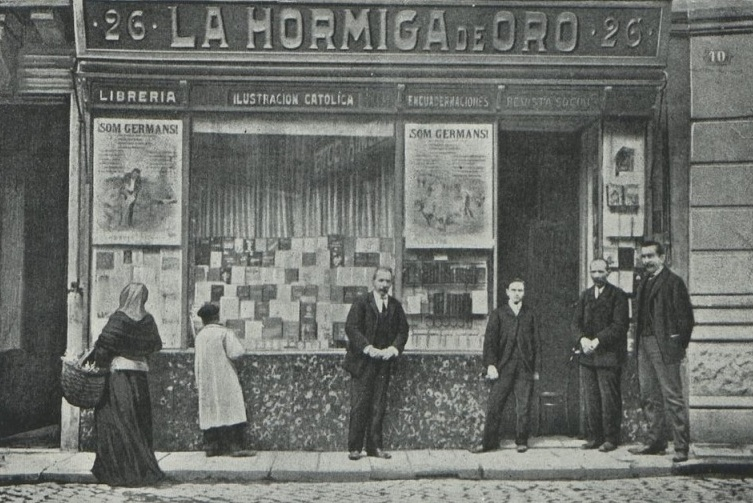
La Hormiga de Oro bookstore

In the mid-1880s Llauder seemed fully aligned with the Integrist vision and its key components: intransigent Catholicism, political abstention, and Carlism understood primarily as a platform of religious mobilization. He self-declared himself an Integrist, writing with pride that "only a small group of faithful disciples followed the Church [...]. This group was called integristas, intransigentes or tradicionalistas". He took part in number of formal Integrist-defined and Integrist-named public initiatives, let alone co-operation between Correo Catalán and El Siglo Futuro, his daily representing an exclusivist, hard-line, machamartillo format of religiosity. By scholars he is clearly considered as "member of the Integrist sector of the party". However, apart from continuing guerra periodistica, Llauder is not recognized for confronting the competitive group, led by marqués de Cerralbo and known as aperturistas, and is not considered protagonist of increasingly bitter strife between the warring factions.

== Breakup of 1888 ==
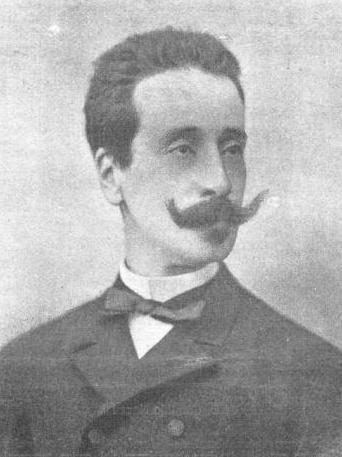
Ramón Nocedal

In early 1888 the claimant invited Llauder to his Venice residence and asked to prepare a publication which would clarify the official royal position. His personal choice might have seemed surprising given Llauder's role in Integrism, as Nocedal's son Ramón clearly aimed at reducing the claimant to a decorative role. Some scholars claim that Carlos VII picked Llauder considering him an in-between person who would act as mediator between the two factions. Other students suggest that the Carlist king intended to outplay the Nocedalistas by luring into his camp one of their politicians, and that choosing Llauder was a smart deceiving move.

The publication took shape of a March 1888 article in Correo Catalán, titled El Pensamiento del Duque de Madrid; it was styled as an interview with the claimant. Apart from doctrinal issues it urged moderation, respect for other Traditionalists and stated that no daily could speak for the king. Instead of reconciliation, it led to escalation; Nocedal and his supporters left Carlism and set up their own party. Though the breakup did not have a major effect on the rank-and-file, it devastated Carlist network of periodicals; most editorial boards decided to side with the secessionists. Llauder's position came as a surprise: for 10 years one of the most prestigious Nocedals' supporters, he decided not to join them and to stand by his king.

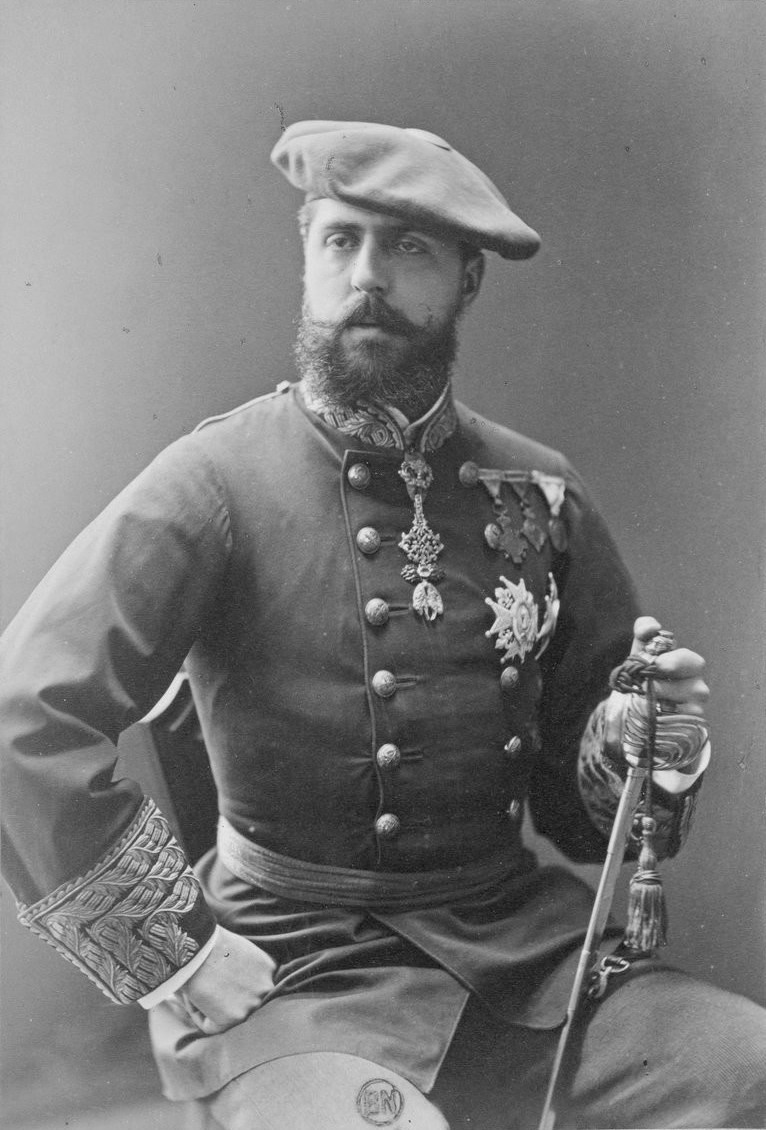
Carlos VII, probably around 1890

Llauder's motives are not entirely clear; it seems that out of two features constituting his previous position, the Integrist outlook and the loyalty to Carlist dynasty, the latter prevailed. His stand came as a nasty surprise for the Nocedalistas, who declared Llauder a traitor. When striking back he played down ideological differences and tended to define the conflict as result of overgrown personal ambitions of Nocedal. Also in case of Sarda Llauder confirmed validity of his works, noting that the author took unduly advantage of his prestige. In general, he tended to approach the Integrists as a sick branch of a healthy tree and later tried to exercise some moderating influence; following clashes in the Olimpo theatre in 1889 he criticized Carlists taking part and demanded they do not respond to provocations.

As the breakaway Nocedalistas controlled El Siglo Futuro, previously the national party mouthpiece, Carlos VII decided to set a new semi-official Carlist newspaper; this role was entrusted to Llauder, who in 1888–1889 moved to Madrid. Initially to be named El Estandarte Real, the daily materialized in 1888 as El Correo Español, largely modeled on Correo Catalán and by some considered its "brother newspaper". Following successful launch, in 1889 Llauder transferred ownership to the claimant, ceded management to Leandro Herrero and moved back to Barcelona. According to some, it was Llauder who offered job in the editorial board to Juan Vázquez de Mella. Though in the early 1890s some suggested that Llauder takes back leadership of the newspaper, suffering from capricious de Mella's management, the daily proved a lasting enterprise and closed as late as 1922.

== Catalan Jefe ==
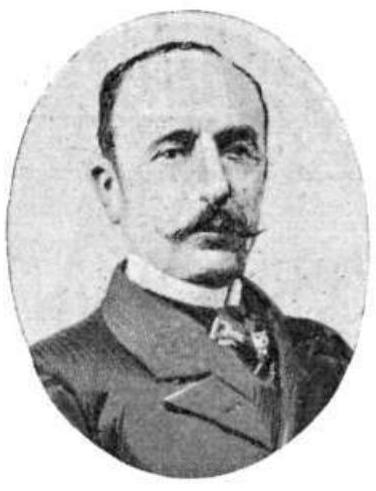
marques de Cerralbo

The new party leader de Cerralbo pursued his own vision of Carlism, focused on organizational build-up. Its initial embodiment were structures officially created to co-ordinate Carlist celebrations of the so-called Conversión de Recaredo; in 1889 Llauder was nominated Catalan representative in Junta Central and head of Catalan Junta Regional. Though the nomination was protested by those who remembered his anti-belligerent stand in the 1870s and those who resented his alliance with the Integros in the 1880s, in 1890 Llauder was confirmed as President of new official Junta Regional Carlista.

In Catalonia Llauder presided over transformation of Carlism from a loose movement into a modern and efficient party. In line with Cerralbo's strategy he worked towards setting local structures, encouraging new juntas whenever possible. He proved very efficient: in 1892 Catalonia boasted 43 circulos out of 102 existing in Spain; in 1896 the number grew to 100 out of 298, with Barcelona province leading the way with 46 circulos. According to Llauder himself, along Navarre the countryside of muntanya catalana turned the very heartland of Spanish Carlism. First Juventud section, a new juvenile branch, was created in Barcelona in 1894.

Though in general he remained antiparliamentarian and considered elections a secondary issue, sort of front cover-up for Liberal backstage rule, he engaged in Carlist electoral effort, resumed by de Cerralbo for the first time in the 1891 campaign. When acknowledging rather poor results at the pools in 1891 (2 MPs), 1896 (2) and 1898 (2), let alone the disastrous 1893 campaign (no mandate), he noted it would have been absurd to conclude that Carlism enjoyed so limited support, blaming fraud for the poor showing. Himself he stood in his old constituency of Berga and was successful in 1891, but lost in 1893. In 1896 he successfully ran for Senate from Girona, but on the claimant's order he refused to take oath and signed Manifiesto de las minorias carlistas; by some sources he is not listed as a senator.

Carlist standard

During his 14-year leadership of Catalan Carlism Llauder emerged as one of key party heavyweights of the late 19th century. He is considered principal agent of carlismo nuevo in the region; Catalonia was the first stage of innovative Cerralbo's tours across the country and Llauder worked hand-in-hand with jefe delegado to implement new peaceful strategy and defuse conspiracy which aimed at renewing violence. He hugely contributed to smooth recovery of Catalan Carlism from the Nocedalista crisis; though Llauder had to cope with internal conflict; he played vital role in party consolidation of the 1890. His 1897 contribution to Acta de Loredan became last Llauder's major public engagement; starting 1898 due to rapidly deteriorating health he was spending long periods in the spa of Cardó and his regional leadership became largely theoretical. In 1898 the claimant declared him marqués de Vallteix. No scholar mentions Llauder discussing Carlist 1900 revolts in Catalonia, which suggests that shortly before death - still official jefe - he already played no major role in politics.

== Publisher ==
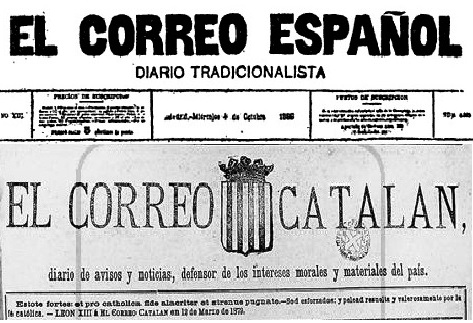
brother newspapers

Though he owned, managed and edited a number of periodicals, including La Convicción in 1870–1873 and El Correo Español in 1888–1889, as a publisher Llauder is first and foremost recognized as the moving spirit behind two enterprises which turned into monumental periodical prints in Catalonia, the daily Correo Catalán and the weekly La Hormiga de Oro; both issued for more than half a century, both outlived him by 34 years.

Correo Catalán, started in 1876, was taken over by Llauder in 1878. Unlike Correo Español, launched with official party finances, Correo Catalán was Llauder's private property. He remained also chief editor of the daily, formatted as continuation of La Convicción. During the first decade it followed the Integrist line of Nocedal and Sarda; though after 1888 the daily remained within mainstream Traditionalism, it very much kept pursuing the same intransigent Catholic line. Correo remained a semi-official party paper in Catalonia, publishing orders and dispositions, mobilizing organizational work and disseminating propaganda. It chiefly consisted of 3 sections: news, opinion and fixed columns, dominated by religious subjects. The daily developed weekly mutations in Tarragona, Girona and Lleida. Its circulation is not clear; some sources claim 4,000 copies and some claim as much as 8,000 copies. Personal Llauder's trademark were his Sunday editorials. In 1899 he ceded command of the paper to Salvador Morales.

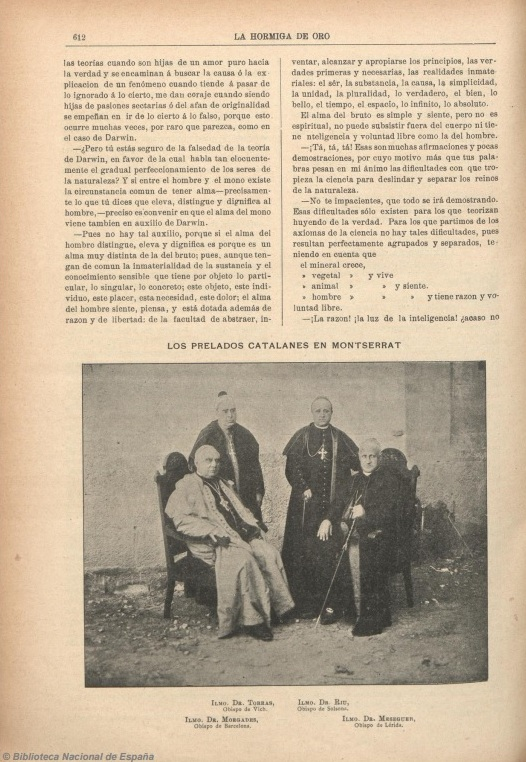
La Hormiga de Oro, sample from 1899

The 1884-launched La Hormiga de Oro was among innovative periodicals on the Spanish market; published in A3, they combined text and high-quality graphics, first drawings and since early 1890s also photographs. The weekly aspired to the role of popular enciclopedia educativa; its contents comprised news, information, history, letters, arts, politics, though it was dominated by religion-related topics. Key difference between Hormiga and likewise reviews was its confessional nature; it was intended to disseminate Christian thought by means of affordable modern media. Carlism, though present, did not form a leading thread. Distribution included Spain, Portugal, Philippines and Latin America, the number of subscribers estimated at 4,000; in the early 20th century it was one of 6 reviews with the highest circulation in Spain. Llauder did not run Hormiga, ceding management to different directors.

The power plant behind Llauder's periodicals was his publishing house La Hormiga de Oro, founded in 1887; of three similar Carlist enterprises in Catalonia it was the most stable and the most durable one. With a dedicated book shop serving as a front-end customer interface, the conglomerate demonstrated that Llauder was fully conscious of the commencing mass culture era. Its business soundness is unclear. It remains striking that Llauder, himself a solitary leading a modest life, between 1871 and 1902 sold real estate inherited from his ancestors. It seems that a fortune, accumulated by nine generations of the Llauder family, has ultimately been spent as financial reserve sustaining Carlist propaganda machinery in Catalonia.

== Author ==
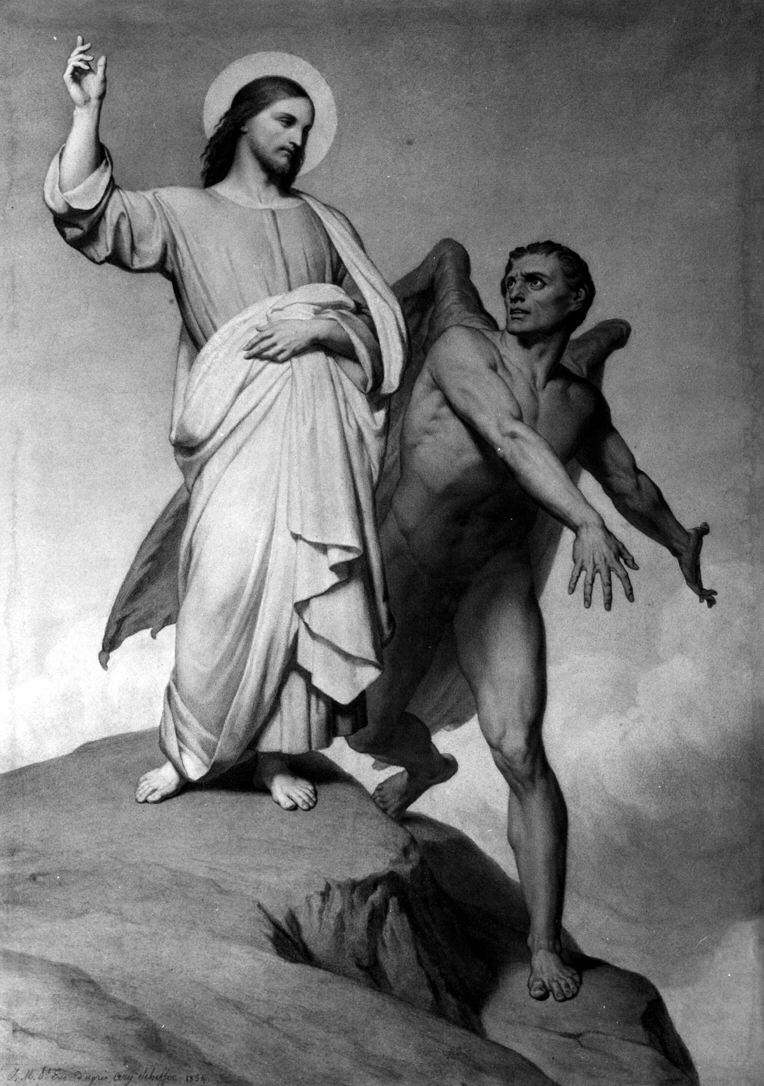
the world might be yours

Llauder kept contributing to different newspapers between mid-1860s and early 20th century, though his opus is mostly editorials to Correo Catalan; between 1888 and 1900 he published 537 of them. Written in Spanish, they were usually clearly attributable, covered range of topics and served as semi-official Carlist lecture. Llauder was no political theorist, but his contribution is named "corpus de doctrina carlista" and compared to that of key Carlist ideologues like Aparisi Guijarro or Vázquez de Mella. Some maintain that Llauder underwent ideological evolution, testimonial to schizophrenia of Carlism in the late 19th century; others argue that he demonstrated "coherencia personal i ideologica". Upon death he was hailed as giant figure in journalism, today in historiography of Spanish periodismo he is acknowledged rather briefly.

The primary feature of Llauder's writings was Catholicism; some described his editorial activity as secular evangelization and dubbed him "sacerdote de la causa". His religiosity was formatted along fundamentalist lines, based on Manichean vision of the world as a battleground between God and satan. Principal Llauder's foe was liberal Catholicism; campaigns against its embodiment, Alejandro Pidal, were by some dubbed as pidalofobia. Most events were interpreted within chiliastic perspective, either episodes like cholera threat in 1890 and attempt against Martínez Campos in 1893 or milestones of Spanish history like the 1898 crisis. The Cuban war was seen as a warning (maybe the final one) to Spain, and the United States was presented as a divine tool, sort of a plague, administered by God to punish the Spaniards for their offences.

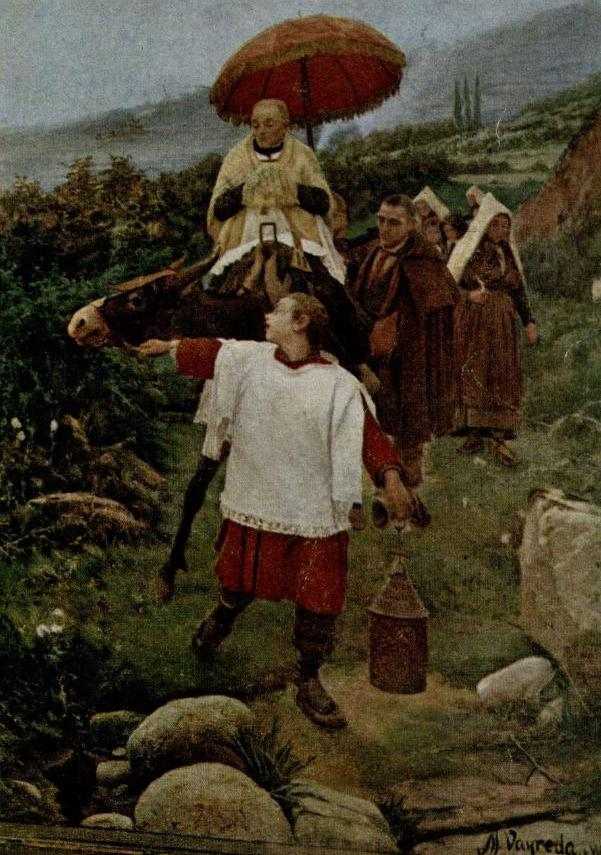
Catalunya muntanyenca

Llauder's vision of politics was an Integrist one. He viewed Carlism not as a political option, but rather as work of divine providence; within this perspective dynastic issues were secondary to questions of principles. Carlism was the trunk of the good tree as opposed to the bad tree; the trunk of the latter was Liberalism, its gardeners were Protestants, freemasonry and Judaism, while its satanic fruits were nihilism, socialism and anarchism, all patricide ideologies. The Restoration regime was considered a farce, while the party system and universal suffrage were deemed corruptive manipulative mechanisms. Llauder viewed social problems as part of religious issue, results of godless Liberalism allowing shameless profiteering, brought to Spain by foreign and Jewish speculators. Spanish economy was described as feudalism of money, with Jews playing seniors and caciques their vassals.

Though some scholars claim that opposing centralization was one of his political principles and underline that foralism was key component of Catalan Carlism, others argue that regionalism did not form a key thread of his writings. He considered genuine Traditionalists "españoles de sangre y corazón". He viewed nascent Catalanism with cautious sympathy as sort of unconscious Carlism; he encouraged the young Catalanists to look for their own way, confident that sooner or later they would join the ranks of Traditionalism and its vision of Catalunya muntanyenca. It was only after a few years when he concluded with some surprise that key Catalanist tribune La Renaixensa was "periódico sistemáticamente anticarlista".

== See also ==
- Carlism
- Integrism (Spain)
- La Hormiga de Oro
- El Correo Catalán
- Electoral Carlism (Restoration)
- Vil·la romana de Torre Llauder
- Historia de la prensa española
