= José María García Verde =

Spanish engineer and politician (1896–1955)

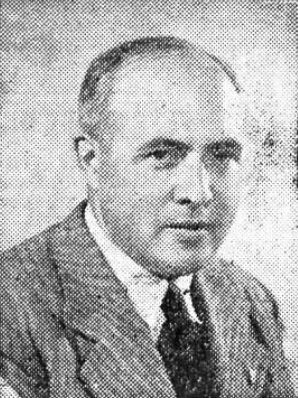
- Born: 14 March 1896; Bilbao, Spain
- Died: 26 May 1955 (aged 59); Madrid, Francoist Spain
- Occupations: Engineer and rancher
- Political party: Integrist Party; Traditionalist Communion

José María García Verde (14 March 1896 − 26 May 1955) was a Spanish engineer and traditionalist politician.

== Biography ==
He was born in a deeply Catholic family of Bilbao, and his parents were Hermenegildo García Sanz (1850–1929) and Cándida Verde Delgado (1860–1932). His father was a member of the Integrist Party and one of the most important promoters of El Siglo Futuro. (Note: His father was such an important figure for El Siglo Futuro that he was buried with an edition of the newspaper.) An important and wealthy local figure, García Sanz had founded three Catholic schools for poor children at the Province of Soria. Hermenegildo was a staunch traditionalist and a great admirer of Ecuadorian president Gabriel García Moreno, considered a founding figure of Catholic Integralism. He educated his children in strict Catholic discipline and transmitted his political beliefs to them.

His family had lived in Argentina, where they held some businesses, and García Verde would travel to the Americas frequently. García Verde lived in Bilbao for most of his childhood, but would travel every summer and autumn to Soria and Derroñadas, the birth town of his father.

After his family moved to Madrid, José María García Verde was chosen as leader of the youth wing of the Integrist Party at the capital city, standing out as an organizer of public propaganda meetings.

He worked as an engineer during his youth years, but left his profession to move to the Cordoban countryside and become a rancher.

García Verde returned to political activity after the Second Spanish Republic was proclaimed. He became a close friend of the provincial chief of the Traditionalist Communion, José María de Alvear, and was imprisoned with him 10 August 1932 at the Cárcel de Córdoba after the Sanjurjada.

In 1934, he was designated as regional chief of the Traditionalist Communion for West Andalusia as a successor to Manuel Fal Conde, and organized the traditionalist youth wing of the region.

Along with Juan José Palomino and José María García de Paredes, he promoted the traditionalist press at Andalusia, serving as director to 6 newspapers of the Impresora Bética group.

After the 1936 Spanish coup d'état, he served at Seville as a comisario de guerra for the Requeté. In 1937 he did not adhere to the Unification Decree and remained loyal to Manuel Fal Conde's dissident leadership. In July of the same year he resigned from the political position the FET y de las JONS had granted him.

After the war he kept holding the position of regional chief clandestinely. In February 1947 he took part in the first general assembly of the regional authorities of the Traditionalist Communion after the Spanish Civil War, and submitted a request to General Francisco Franco asking for a regime change in favour of a traditional monarchy.

García Verde was a member of the Sodality of Our Lady and a franciscan tertiary. He directed the Retreat centre of Cerro de los Sagrados Corazones at San Juan de Aznalfarache. Fal Conde highlighted his devotion to the Rosary and his active engagement in Catholic proselitism and charity.

In his obituary, Fal Conde stated that Carlist cardinal Pedro Segura had found in him the "best collaborator in the propagation of his holy ideals" and that the Traditionalist Communion had never had such a "loyal Carlist to the chief's plans, either in conspirations, recruitments, propaganda and loyalty to the king".

== Family ==
His siblings were Cándida, Hermenegildo, Carmen, Pilar, Tomasa, Celestino, Mercedes, Manuel, Ricardo and Ramón García Verde. In 1922 he married Mercedes Hernández-Ros y Codorniú, granddaughter of Ricardo Codorniu and cousin of Juan de La Cierva, with whom he had seven children: Mercedes, José Luis, Ramón, Rafael, Fernando, Ana María y Carmen García-Verde Hernández-Ros.

His niece Mercedes de la Gándara García, daughter of his sister Cándida, married Juan Sáenz-Díez, a renowned Carlist authority during the Spanish Civil War, the Francoist dictatorship and the Spanish Transition. His nephew José Luis Marín García-Verde, son of his sister Tomasa, was a guerrilla fighter at the requeté and was involved in the Montejurra massacre in 1976.

Hermenegildo and José Ramón García Llorente, sons of his brother Hermenegildo García Verde, became prominent political figures of late 20th-century Carlism; the former was an important figure for the reconstitution of the Traditionalist Communion in 1975 and the latter became a close collaborator of Sixto Enrique de Borbón in the decades of 1980 and 1990.

== Bibliography ==
- Navarro Canales, Ignacio (1929). Padre y caballero cristiano. Apuntamientos biográficos del Señor Don Hermenegildo García Sanz. Madrid: Imprenta Católica.
- García Verde (1955). La muerte de un justo: José María García Verde, congregante mariano y terciario franciscano.
- Tudela, José (1966). "Recuerdos y notas de mi tierra: Un pionero soriano. Hermenegildo García Verde". Centro de Estudios Sorianos (31). Celtiberia: 115–121.
- Ferrer, Melchor (1979). Historia del tradicionalismo español (PDF). Vol. I, 30. Editorial Católica Española, S.A.
- Martorell Pérez, Manuel (2009). La continuidad ideológica del carlismo tras la Guerra Civil. UNED.
