= Joaquín Gomis Cornet =

Spanish Catalan entrepreneur and politician

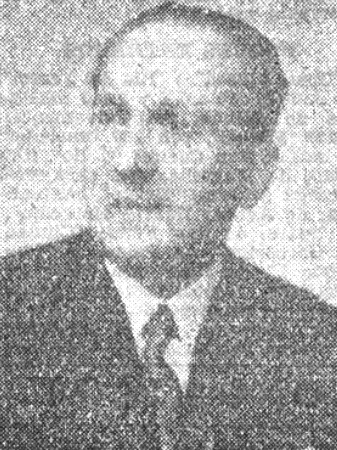
- Born: Joaquín Gomis Cornet; 1869; Manresa, Spain
- Died: 1957 (aged 87–88); Barcelona, Spain
- Occupation: businessman
- Known for: entrepreneur, politician
- Political party: Carlism

Joaquín Gomis Cornet (1869–1957) was a Spanish Catalan entrepreneur and politician. In business he is known mostly as co-owner and manager of numerous mid-size companies from the Catalan hydroelectricity sector, which controlled large part of the power grid based on the Llobregat and the Segre basins. In politics he is known as a Traditionalist; in the 1930s and 1940s he formed part of the Catalan Carlist executive, Junta Regional, though he was not its active protagonist. In the early 20th century Gomis was briefly the mayor of Manresa. His few bids for the Cortes ticket failed.

== Family and youth ==
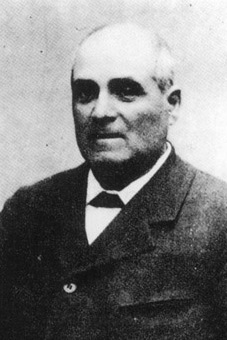
father

The Gomis surname has been noted in Spain since the Middle Ages, especially along the Mediterranean coast in Catalonia and Levante. Over the centuries it became extremely popular with many well-known representatives. One branch settled in Manresa, where they formed part of emerging bourgeoisie; in the 18th century the Gomis were running metalworking facilities in the city, yet it is not clear whether they were Joaquín's ascendants. His only forebear identified is his father, Francesco Gomis Soler (1833–1897). In the mid-19th century he opened in Manresa a manufacture producing silk ribbons for Cuban tobacconists. In 1884 he took over a mid-size cotton spinning Can Canals factory in San Martí de Torroella. In the early 1890s he opened a cotton yarn factory near Monistrol de Montserrat, in a place named Costa de Vallbona. He built a nearby residential quarter – including a church and a school – for employees; it was named Colònia Gomis. In 1881–1883 and 1890–1891 Gomis Soler was among the regidores of Manresa.

At unspecified time, though probably either in the late 1850s or in the early 1860s, Gomis Soler married Francesca Cornet Viladés (died 1908); nothing is known about her or her family. The couple lived in Manresa. They had at least 5 children; all of these known were boys: Francisco, Joaquín, Enrique, Luis, and Manuel, yet it is not clear in what sequence they were born. Neither any of the sources consulted provides information on childhood and early teen years of Joaquín. e.g. where he obtained the bachillerato. He followed a fairly typical path for young men of his class and studied law, though not clear whether in Barcelona or at some other university. He graduated probably in the early 1890s, as in 1892 he was recorded back in Manresa. Since the mid-1890s he was noted as engaged together with Francisco and Enrique in Viuda y Hijos de Francisco Gomis Soler, the company which operated the cotton business, inherited from the late father; with Enrique as director, in the early 20th century the Gomis factory employed 130 workers.

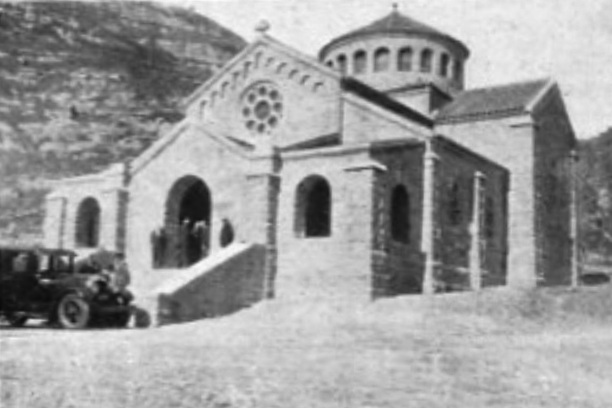
church in Colònia Gomis

At unspecified time Gomis Cornet married Concepción Ynglada Sallent from an established Catalan Ynglada family, active in particular in trade business with Cuba; she was sister to a well-known graphic, Pere Ynglada Sallent. The couple had no children before Concepción died in 1929. As a widower and already a sexagenarian, Gomis remarried with María (in some sources Maruja) Soldevila Grau; nothing is known about her or her family except that she was much younger (died 1986). Neither the second marriage produced any offspring. Gomis' best known relatives are his brothers, moderately recognized in Catalonia: Enrique as a manager in the electricity business and Luis as a Catholic priest, publisher, author and educator. Joaquin's nephews were Enrique Gomis Perera, a ski-jumper, ice-hockey player and tourist, and Luis Gomis Perera, both entrepreneurs in Catalan energy industry.

== Carlist: Manresa (until 1918) ==
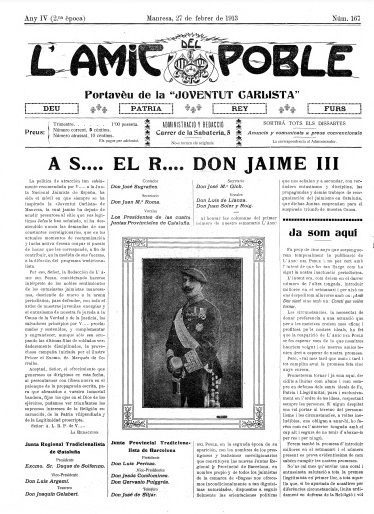
L'Amic del Poble

More distant Gomis' ancestors tended to support the Conservatives, but his father was a Carlist, perhaps of some Integrist leaning. He remained on friendly terms with the regional party leader Luis Maria Llauder Dalmases and in Manresa he ranked as the second Carlist after Ignacio Vidal Balet, though he did not feature prominently in the Catalan party organisation. Joaquín inherited political preferences from his parent. In 1890 he took part in homage sessions to Carlist leader marqués de Cerralbo, in the early 1890s he served as secretary in Centro Católico de Manresa and joined Juventud Carlista Manresana. He demonstrated particular interest in press endeavors; during the decade he edited a periodical La Voz Manresana, the mouthpiece of local Traditionalism. In 1905 he founded the Catalan-language L'Amic del Poble, which initially proved short-lived until revived some time later.

In 1903 Gomis decided to run for the Manresa city council; various sources claim he formed part either of "candidatura administrativa" or "candidatura regionalista" or featured on a joint Catalanist-Carlist list led by Leonci Soler March. He was elected as one of 4 Carlists, thus commencing a string of almost 15 years of service in the ayuntamiento; he was later repeatedly voted into the town hall on various lists, though usually this of a right-wing alliance Candidatura Manresana, e.g. in 1911 or 1915. In 1909 it reproduced the overall regional electoral pattern, marked by emergence of Solidaridad Catalana, and appeared as Solidaridad Manresana. In the council he was member of various commissions. During numerous strings Gomis served as one of many deputy mayors, e.g. in 1906 as primero teniente de alcalde and in 1910 as segundo teniente. He was last noted as member of the town hall in 1918.

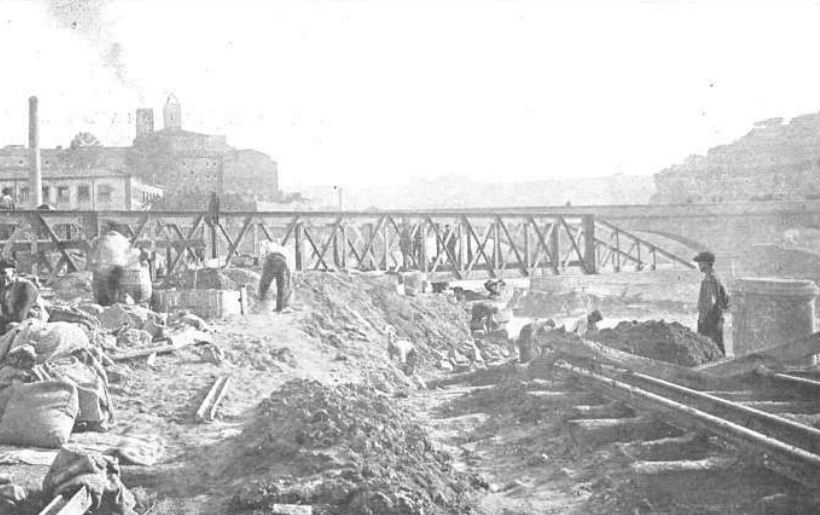
Manresa, aftermath of 1907 flood

Gomis twice during brief few-month periods served as alcalde of Manresa, in both cases in somewhat unusual circumstances. In 1907 he was alcalde incidental as alcalde titular Pere Armengou i Mansó was unfit; in 1909 the Maura government nominated him alcalde accidental following turbulent elections and revolutionary unrest. Both strings were marked by extraordinary developments. On October 12, 1907, the city suffered from catastrophic flood; following torrential rains the Llobregat burst its banks, causing extensive damages to infrastructure. On July 29, 1909, the city was engulfed in violence as part of so-called Tragic Week. Gomis asked commander of local military detachment to patrol the city and ordered Guardia Civil to protect the railway station. Unlike in other Catalan locations the Anarchist and Republican revolutionaries failed to take over the town hall and destroy railway tracks; there were no fatal casualties recorded in the city. In his later report to Madrid Gomis blamed "subversive ideas", circulating among workers. As mayor he declared his 3 priorities: founding a local Instituto, urbanistic reform and upgrade of charity infrastructure.

== Carlist: Catalonia (1918–1923) ==
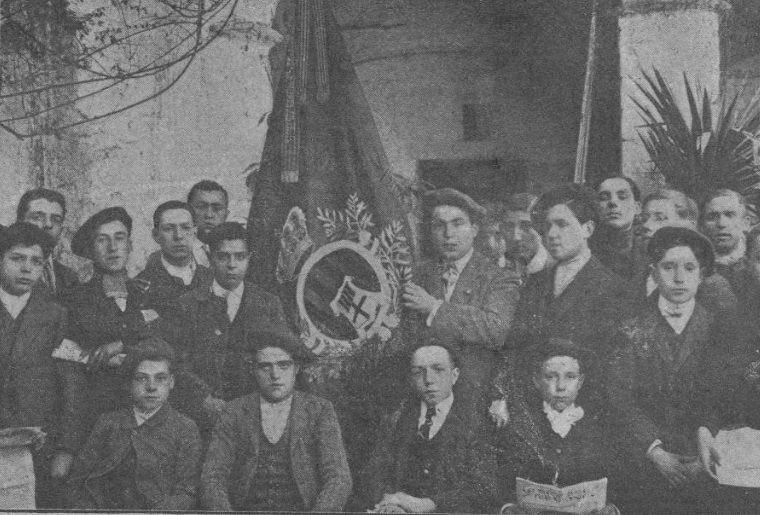
Manresa requeté

It is not clear whether Gomis resigned from career in the municipal self-government or whether he failed in elections. At the time he was already a locally recognized personality. He held vice-presidency of Junta Tradicionalista de Manresa and featured prominently in Bages party structures. His standing in the local milieu was enhanced by the Gomis electricity business, in the 1910s just taking off the ground, especially that since mid-1910s he was president of Camara de Comercio e Industria de Manresa. The family owned minor press titles, he served also in local arbitrary board and his brother Lluis was a key man behind the local Federación Obrera Católica. In 1919 Gomis tried to launch his career nationwide: as a Carlist he ran for the Cortes from his native district of Berga. His counter-candidate was José Olano Lozaga, supported by governmental administration and by Unión Monárquica Nacional, an anti-Catalanist Catalan right-wing party. Gomis got 1.996 votes (24,65%) and lost. In the 1921 elections for Mancomunitat he was supposed to stand as official Carlist candidate from one of the Barcelona districts; this time he was supported by UMN. It is not clear whether he was defeated ot withdrew.

At the turn of the decades Gomis was already emerging among the regional party leaders, though scholars do not count him among the elite of Catalan Carlism, composed – apart from Llanza Pignatelli and Batlle Baró – of politicians younger than him: Pedro Llosas, Miguel Junyent, Lluís Argemí, Lluís Pericàs, Bartomeu Trias, Dalmacio Iglesias, Llorenç M. Alier, Marià Bordas or Daniel Serres. However, local Carlist youth from Manresa viewed him with suspicion as the man stained by collaboration with "caciquisme radical-conservador", rotten corrupted networks of the restoration regime, especially that in fact Gomis negotiated electoral deals with Antonio Maura. Though Manresa is usually identified as birthplace of the Carlist paramilitary requeté, in literature Gomis never appears as related to the organisation.

Carlist standard

Present-day scholar presents Gomis as a moderate politician. Though young Manresan Carlists considered the emerging Catalanism their key foe, Gomis remained on friendly terms with La Lliga, both locally with Pedro Armengou Manso and regionally with Enric Prat de la Riba. By closing alliances like Solidaridad Manresana he demonstrated preference for a local "coalició carlo-regionalista". This tendency reportedly stemmed not that much from Gomis' sympathy to Catalanism, but rather was the result of his underestimating the potential of political Catalan nationalism, whom he thought a minor partner. His key political opponent was rather republicanism, especially in its radical version. In Manresa it was led by Maurici Fius i Palà, whom Gomis confronted a number of times when trying to reduce his position in the ayuntamiento; to Gomis he represented "bandera de la pertorbació social". In the early 1920s Gomis launched a local weekly Seny; its purpose was specifically to confront young Radicals. It disappeared soon; the 1923 coup of Primo de Rivera put political life in the country on hold. For Gomis it was an opportunity to focus on business.

== Hydropower (1920s) ==
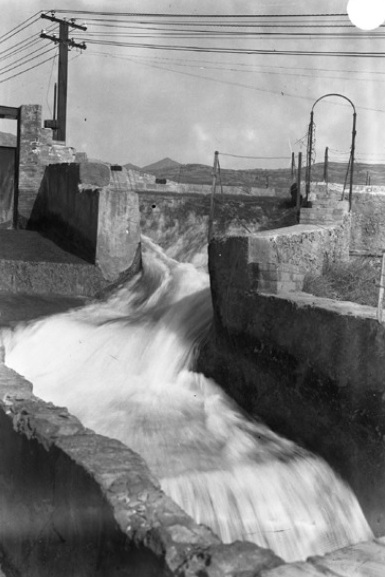
Berga installation

The business inherited by the Gomis brothers was related to textiles; however, the Monistrol de Montserrat plant was powered by own small hydro-electric installation, built in the 1890s by Gomis Soler on the Llobregat. Initially this station performed an auxiliary role, yet starting early 20th century the brothers started to develop it above the demand of their textile factory. In 1908 they set up Elèctrica Gomís and started to sell electricity; one of their first customers was the Montserrat Abbey and later its funicular, while in the coming years they became suppliers to the neighboring area. In 1916 Gomis decided to focus on energy production, installed new turbines in their Monistrol station and leased the cotton plant out. Following long-lasting maneuvers in 1921 they took control of Companyia Anònima Manresana d'Electricitat (CAME), a company which served Manresa and surroundings.

In 1923 the Gomis integrated their business in Fuerza y Alumbrado (FASA), to be quoted on Barcelona and Madrid stock markets; with annual production of 1.75m kWh it was a minor player which served some 30 locations. In the mid-1920s they took over Fábrica de la Luz, another provider centred around Berga, and in the late 1920s FASA emerged as a mid-size company on the Catalan company energy market, serving areas from Berga to Terrassa and Martorell. Later the Gomis brothers made first incursions into the Cadí-Moixeró area, their eyes set on small Llobregat tributaries the Bastareny and the Pendís; negotiations about purchase of some 1.650 ha went on with no success. At the same time the brothers started to expand beyond the Llobregat and focused on the Segre basin. They obtained appropriate concessions to develop infrastructure in so-called Llano de Lérida, on Canal de Piñana, the Segre and Canal de Urgel. Following mergers with Saltos del Piñana, Eléctrica de Balaguer and Eléctrica Baiget they set up Explotacions Hidroelèctriques (EHSA), which commenced construction works in the early 1930s.

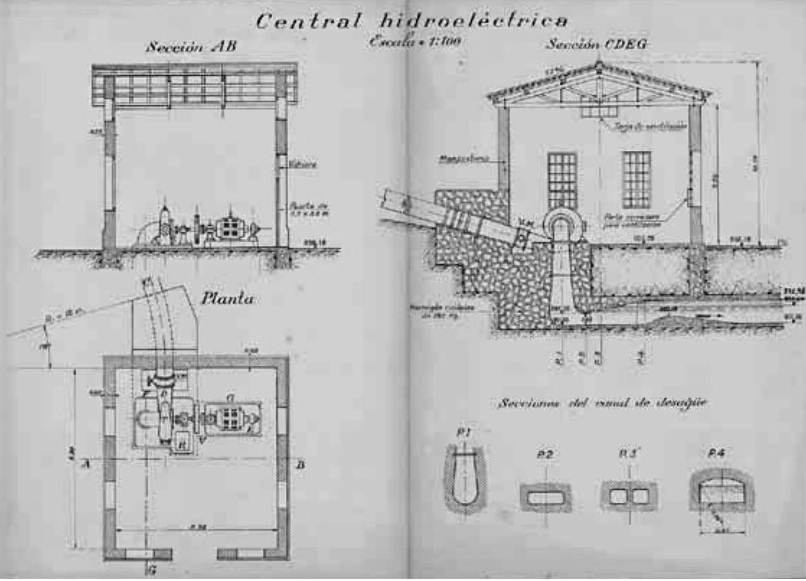
plan of Gomis-owned power station in the Segre basin

The Gomis business strategy was this of systematic growth by means of minor steps, either takeovers of similar smaller companies or building of own small installations. The present-day scholar underlines "extrema prudencia de la familia propietaria", which involved takeovers via front-companies, technically diversified ownership and staying clear of publicity. It reportedly resulted from modus operandi typical for Catalan bourgeoisie and interdependence of the energy market, but also from personal threads like caution ensuing from textile-related origins of the Gomis business, religiosity of the brothers, and their technical incompetence, as they relied on a close circle of professional engineers. This strategy allowed the Gomis to maintain business independence on the market dominated by giants like La Catalana de Gas y Electricidad, Riegos y Fuerza del Ebro or Energia Eléctrica de Cataluña. Their network was integrated into the regional energy grid, controlled by Confederación Sindical Hidrográfica del Pirineo Oriental, but this was in usual terms of co-ordinating supply across a patchy structure of overproduction and unmet demand areas, not in terms of business control.

== Carlist: Catalonia (after 1931) ==
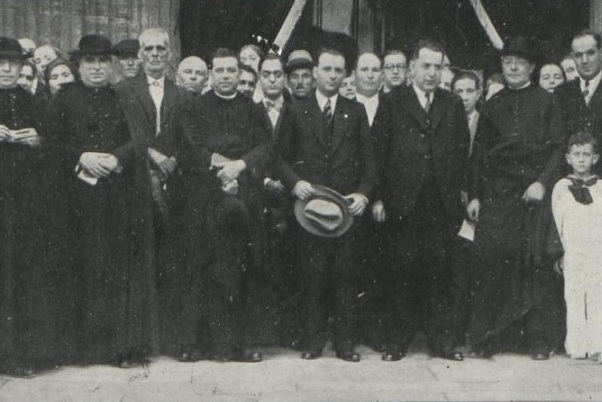
Manresa, funeral service of Carlist pretender Don Jaime, 1931

In late 1930 Gomis was supposed to run as independent in Cortes elections, expected the following year. In February 1931 he entered the Carlist Junta Regional. During funeral service to the defunct Carlist king, Don Jaime, he featured among key attendees. In the spring of 1932 he was co-organizing Semana Tradicionalista in Barcelona, though characteristically, he was not among many speakers but among members of its economic committee. The same year the 63-year-old was briefly detained following disturbances related to inauguration of new premises of Círculo Central Tradicionalista in Barcelona. He did not count among protagonists of national or even regional Carlist politics, though the 1933 luxury album which celebrated 100 years of Carlism mentioned him as "jefe carlista del Distrito de Manresa". His contribution to the movement was financial; in 1934 Gomis invested large sums in the company issuing El Correo Catalan, the regional party mouthpiece, and entered its Consejo de Administración. In 1936 he ran for the Cortes from Barcelona city district on the joint list of Front d'Ordre; with 151.018 votes he was among most-voted Carlists nationally, but failed to obtain the mandate. In early summer, once the regional jefe Alier resigned, local juntas suggested Gomis as member of the ruling triumvirate; the post eventually went to Tomás Cayla.

Fate of the Gomis brothers during the civil war is not clear. Since the early days of the Republic they were engaged in labor conflicts with workers of their hydro-energy conglomerate, be it in 1931 or in 1934, when Sindicat Regional de Llum i Força went on strike in CAME. In proletarian press they were dubbed "saboteurs of the Republic". However, after the July coup the revolutionaries were rather after Lluis, spiritus movens of competitive Catholic trade unions. Colonia Gomis was raided and burnt down. The brothers in unclear circumstances made it to France. They spent the war in Paris and in Belgium.

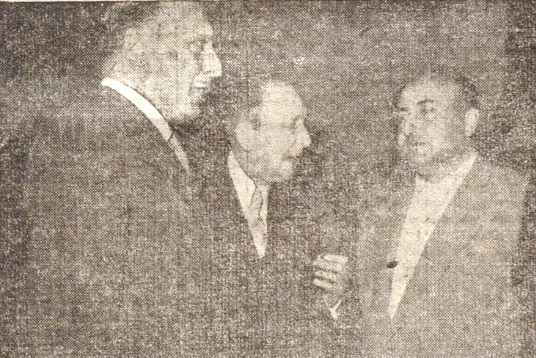
Gomis with Saenz-Diez in board of Prensa Castellana, 1953

Following the Nationalist triumph the Gomis returned to Catalonia; in the mid-1940s Joaquín was president of the board of Fomento de Prensa Tradicionalista (FPT) and its daily, El Correo Catalan. When faced with conflict between the intransigent anti-Francoist Catalan leader Mauricio de Sivatte and more cautious Jefe Delegado Manuel Fal Conde, Gomis sided with the latter. Following destitution of Sivatte in 1949 he was re-appointed to a new Junta Regional, Due to his financial standing Gomis remained in the FPT board until the mid-1950s. In 1953 he became president of Prensa Castellana SA, a company which issued a Madrid daily Informaciones; it was another Carlist media enterprise posing as commercial entity, as the party was seeking ways to remain present in tightly censored public life. He was not noted in any political institutions of the regime and in public limited his activity to charity, culture, vice-presidency and then presidency in Camara Americana de Comercio, Catalan press life and religion. He kept attracting criticism of the émigré press, which lambasted him as "conocido financiero barcelonés" who ruthlessly exploits workers in his hydro-power business.

== Hydropower (after 1939) ==
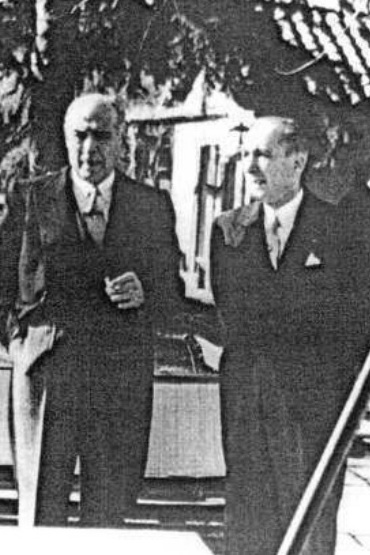
Gomis brothers, 1955

There is little known about the Gomis-owned grid during the civil war; as both brothers sought refuge abroad, the power and distribution installations must have been operated by local committees or sindicates. After the war it turned out that the infrastructure was badly damaged, unclear whether due to technical incompetence, poor maintenance, destruction carried out by withdrawing Republican troops or result of "artillería hidraulica", Nationalist damage intended to cause power shortages in Republican zone. Joaquín and Enrique embarked on reconstruction works, carried out until the early 1940s. As they maintained good relations with the regime the works were heavily subsidized, especially that brothers cultivated personal links to local administration, e.g. in the Lerida province. In 1941 there were 8 installations of EHSA operational on Canal de Piñana, Segre and Canal de Urgel; the largest one, Torrefarrera (8,1 m high, 4.800 liters/second) produced 1.2m kWh annually, and in aggregate they produced 2.6m kWh per annum. Similarly, power plants on the Llobregat were brought back to shape.

Shortly after the war long-time talks about the Bastareny and the Pendís were successfully concluded and the Gomis purchased 1.650 ha needed. In 1943 the plan to build a power plant was officially declared "absoluta necesidad nacional"; however, owners of neighboring estates protested and amidst a spate of civil lawsuits and compensations the installation was not launched before Joaquín's death. In 1945 the brothers set up two companies. Fuerzas Hidroeléctricas del Segre (FHSA) was supposed to operate the Lerida grid, about to be expanded; Joaquín became its president. Productora y Distribuidora de Electricidad was intended more as a power distribution entity. The expansion anticipated consisted of launch of the Castillonroy dam on the Noguera Ribargorzana, part of the Segre system. After it went into operation, in the late 1940s the overall capacity of the Segre grid was 5-8m kWh per year.

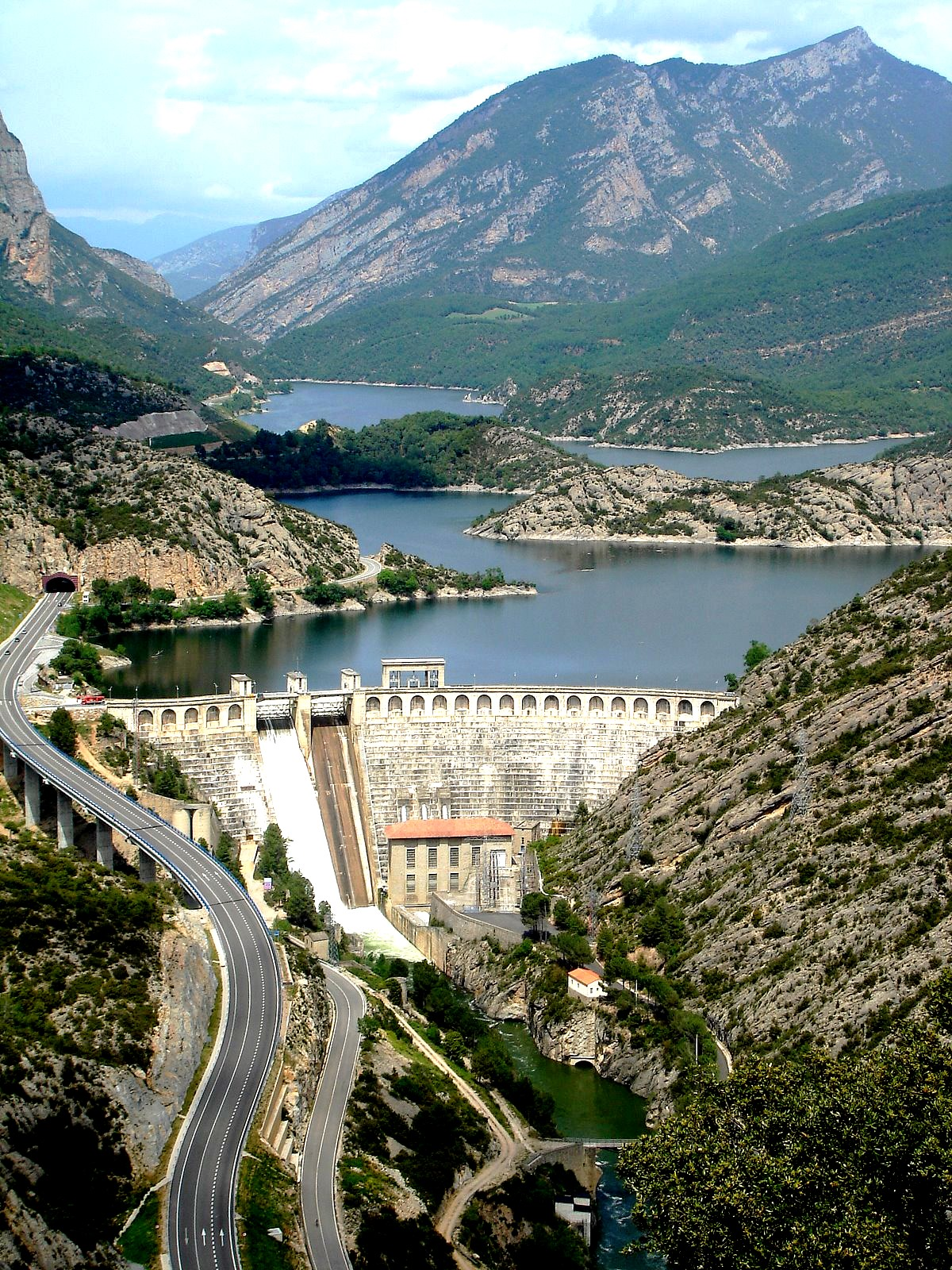
Oliana dam today

In the early 1950s FHSA intended to integrate the Segre and the Llobregat grids and the plans were well advanced. However, the company found itself in conflict over the La Vansa river with another operator, Cooperativa de Fluido Eléctrico. Following various lawsuits a compromise settlement plan to create La Vansa-Segre-Oliana system emerged, but eventually it remained in suspense. At that time the focus of Gomis was on the Oliana dam on the Segre, built entirely by the company. Works started already in 1951 and took a few years, especially following damages during the 1953 storm. Given its massive scale, the project was "opus magnum" of FHSA. The Oliana project was the last one that Joaquín Gomis was engaged in; he did not live to see it completed, as the installation, crowned by 95-metre dam and producing 90m kWh per annum, was pompously opened 2 years after his death. In 1957, the year he died – still as the CEO of FHSA – the company was the 30. largest Spanish electricity producer and the 7th largest one in Catalonia; it depended entirely on hydro-power.

== See also ==
- Carlism
- Traditionalism (Spain)
- Colònia Gomis
- Casal Familiar Recreatiu

== Footnotes ==
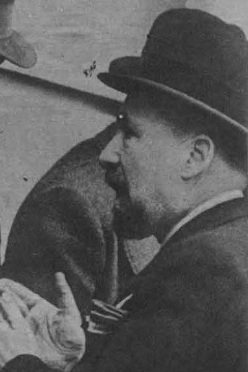
Gomis, mid-1930s
