= Luis Argemí y de Martí =

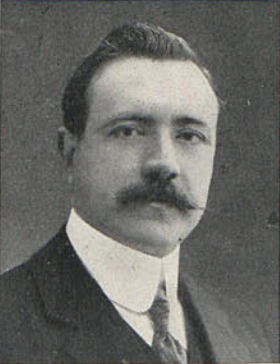
- Born: Luis Argemí y de Martí; 1873; Manresa, Spain
- Died: 1950 (aged 76–77); Barcelona, Spain
- Occupation: entrepreneur
- Known for: businessman, politician
- Political party: Carlism

Luis Argemí y de Martí (Catalan: Lluís Argemí i de Martí; 1873-1950) was a Spanish Catalan entrepreneur and politician. In business his primary focus was on chemicals and his company formed part of a cartel which controlled sections of the European dyes market; however, he was involved also in textile, hydro-electricity, finance, construction and publishing industry. In politics for decades he supported the Carlist cause, yet in the 1940s he put up with Francoism. In 1907-1918 he served in the Barcelona provincial diputation, in 1914-1918 in Mancomunitat, in 1918-1920 in the Senate, and in 1943-1946 again in diputación, this time as its president. In historiography he is known also as promoter and sponsor of Sindicatos Libres, a Catholic trade union which engaged in violent conflict with the Anarchist CNT.

== Family and youth ==
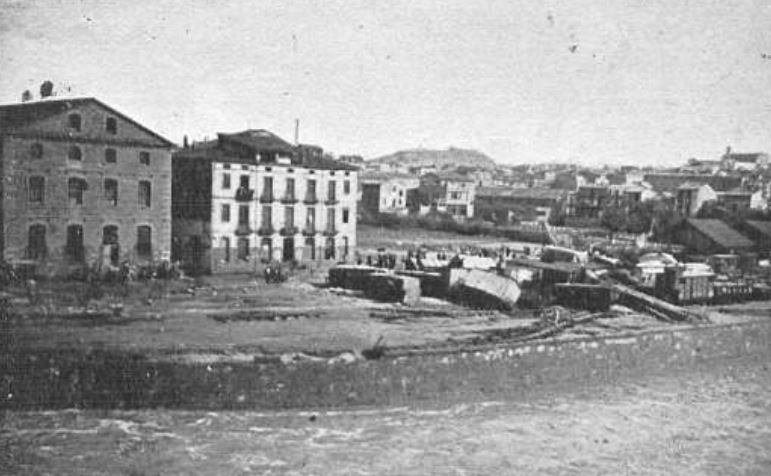
industrial landscape along the Cardener river, Manresa, early 20th. c.

The surname of Argemí appeared in Catalonia already in the early modern era, yet there is close to nothing known about Luis's distant ancestors. In the mid-19th century one branch of the family counted among the local Manresa bourgeoisie; in the 1840s its representatives were noted as stakeholders in the textile company Argemí, Gallifa i Companyia, though in the 1860s they went separate way and set up their own business. The Argemí Gali brothers owned in Manresa a mid-size fiber and fabric factory, known as Pont Vell or Sant Pau; since 1875 they operated also a related hydro plant, powering their textile machinery and located at the banks of the Cardener river. One of the brothers and the father of Luis, Luis Argemí Galí, practiced also as a lawyer, noted as "abogado, propietario y fabricante". None of the sources consulted provides any information on Luis' mother, María del Pilar Martí Miralles, except that she died in 1905; the couple - living in Manresa - had a daughter, Mercedes Argemí de Martí. Mercedes married Jose Figueras Nogues. The couple had one son Santiago Figueras Argemí. Mercedes died soon after giving birth to her son due to birth related complications.

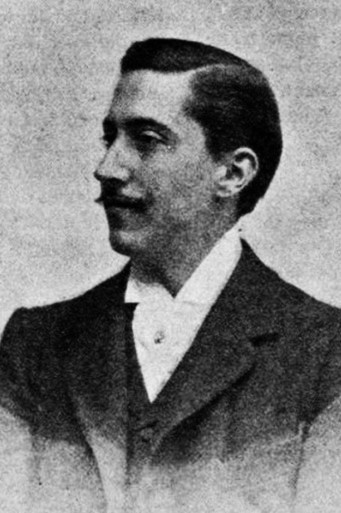
Joaquín Albiñana Folch

The adolescent Luis received his schooling mostly in the 1880s, during 8 years spent in the Piarist college in Barcelona, where he obtained the bachillerato. According to one source he studied in Ciudad Condal and pursued two paths, graduating in law and in filosofía y letras; another source is more specific and claims he was doctor in law, but merely licenciado in philosophy and letters. However, one more source claims he gained his laurels in derecho civil y canónico with sobresaliente marks in Salamanca in 1897. In 1899 he was briefly mentioned at minor official position as fiscal in Esplugas, and in 1900 he was first recorded as a defense lawyer in Barcelona. The official annual listed him as abogado in Manresa in 1903. At that time Argemí was already managing Sant Pau, the plant he inherited from his father and uncles.

In 1901 Argemí married Nieves Albiñana Folch. She was descendant to a few well-off Catalan bourgeoisie families. Her father, Frederic Albiñana Vila, in 1882 co-founded a Barcelona company which traded in grain; it was initially named Folch, Albiñana y Cía, but when it started distilling alcohol it got transformed into Fábrica de Alcoholes Industriales. Luis and Nieves had 3 children, all of them daughters: María Luisa, María Nieves and María del Pilar Argemí Albiñana. The first girl died in 1908 as a four-year-old; the other two got married, but descendants from Del Val Argemí and Escofet Argemí lines did not become public figures. The best known Argemí's relative was his brother-in-law and business partner, Joaquín Albiñana Folch. Recognized as a successful businessman, he was shot by an anarchist during final phases of the Catalan pistolerismo wave in 1923.

== Entrepreneur ==
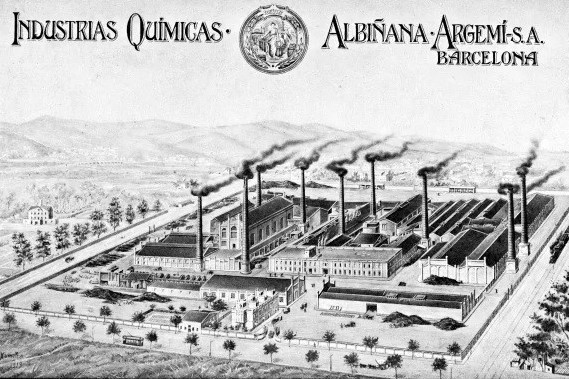
IQAA on postcard

At least since 1899 Argemí was operating the textile plant he inherited in Manresa. In 1915 he was still recorded as owner of Fábrica de San Pau, yet none of the sources consulted confirms he remained engaged in the cotton business later on; in the 1920s he was not listed among the San Pau stakeholders. However, Argemí remained engaged in textile industry because of his newly developed chemical enterprise. In the early 1900s he set up in Barcelona a company named Argemí y Cía, managed by his relative Mariano Miralles y Quintano. It was producing various type of dyes, used for textiles. Its flagship product was a white paint pigment branded Nevin; Argemí was its only manufacturer in Spain. He co-operated with numerous textile companies, including this owned by Albiñana. In 1917 the two families re-established their business in Barcelona as Industrias Químicas Albiñana Argemi S.A. (IQAA). Developed into a large chemical plant with hundreds of employees, in the 1920s this company kept producing Nevin and other types of pigment, like lithopone; in the latter case, IQAA entered an international cartel, which controlled most of the European market. Later the company run into problems, accumulated debt and suspended payments, yet it is not clear whether the case was not rather this of a war between the owner and trade unions. In the 1930s Argemí remained active in Cámara Nacional de Industrias Químicas, where he served as vice-president, and co-organized 1930 and 1932 Congreso Nacional de las Industrias de la Pintura.

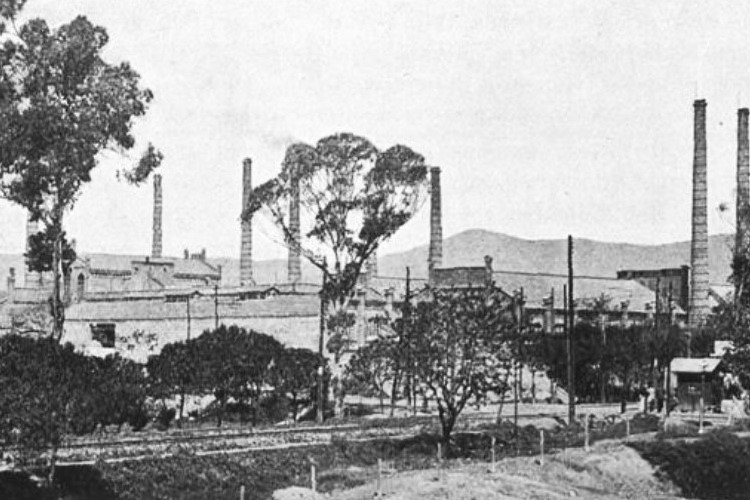
IQAA on photo

Though chemicals was his primary industry, Argemí diversified his entrepreneurial activity into numerous other businesses. Because of his ownership of the Cardener-based power plant, Argemí remained marginally engaged in the hydro-electricity sector; in 1929 he was member of Confederación Sindical Hidrográfica del Pirineo Oriental and periodically formed part of one of its working committees. He tried his hand in finance, and in 1902 co-founded La Unión Catalana, a mutual insurance company; in 1909 he would become the director of the enterprise. Later sources point to his stakes in General de Crédito S.A. (in the 1910s) and Caja de Pensiones para Vejez y de Ahorros (in the 1940s). One more industry he entered was mining; in 1908 Argemí applied for and was granted concessions to explore iron ore in Prades and barite in Vimbodi, both in the province of Tarragona; exploration indeed commenced and continued for a few decades; in the mid-1920s his company opened an overhead cable, transporting barite from a pit in the Tacho gallery to Poblet. In the 1920s Argemí got engaged in construction business; in 1923 he was vice-president of Fomento de Casas Baratas S.A., and in 1924 he co-founded and entered the board of Fomiento Nacional de Viviendas. The last industry he stayed associated with was publishing: in the 1940s, but perhaps also earlier, he was member of Consejo de Administración of La Hórmiga de Oro, a Catholic magazine issued in Barcelona.

== Diputación and Mancomunitat (1907–1918) ==
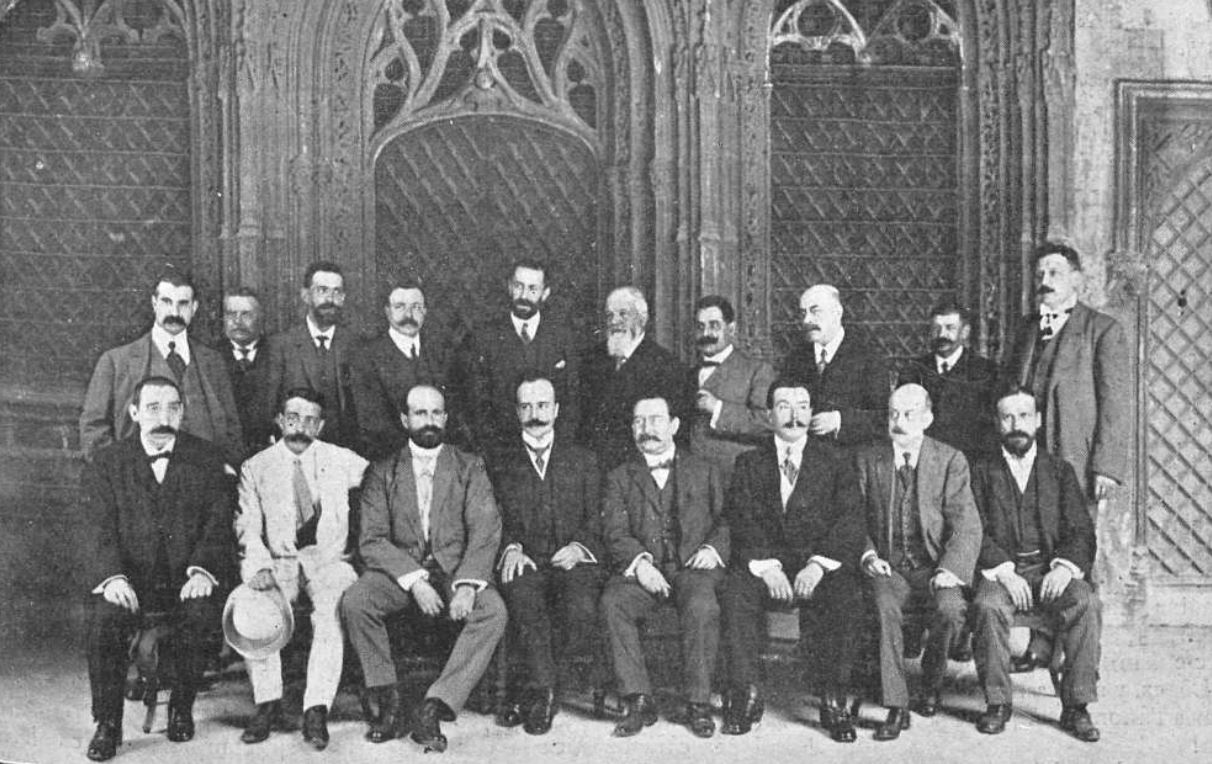
provincial deputies working to set up Mancomunitat, 1911

It is not clear what political preferences prevailed in the Argemí family; it is only known that the parents of Luis were deeply religious. Himself he has not been noted for any engagements until his mid-30s, when he suddenly emerged among Catalan Carlist leaders like Duque de Solferino, Miguel Junyent and Lorenzo Alier. He must have been active in the party for some time, as in 1907 Argemí formed part of the Catalan executive, Junta Regional. At the time this body was divided over strategy versus the nascent Catalanism, and Lliga Regionalista in particular. Argemí voiced strongly in favor of an alliance, and eventually had his way. In 1907 elections to the Barcelona Diputación Provincial he was running on a joint Solidaritat Catalana ticket, in some newspapers referred to as "regionalista", yet "aprobado" by the Carlists. He obtained 8,951 votes and was comfortably elected. As it would turn out, he commenced a 12-year-long spell in Diputación. Argemí was re-elected in 1911, again as a Carlist running on a broad, Lliga-dominated right-wing coalition, this time with 14,575 votes; one more re-election came in 1915, also as part of candidatura regionalista, with 9,787 votes. His service in Diputación terminated in 1918, when Argemí was elected to the Senate.

In the provincial self-government Argemí was active in many fields, as member Comissió de Governació (1909-1911), Comissió de Ferrocarrils Secundaris, Comissió d’Instrucció Pública i Belles Arts (president, 1909), Comissió d’Hisenda (1909-1915), Junta de Govern de les Cases de Caritat i Maternitat (1916), Junta Autònoma del Laboratori General d’Investigació i Assaig, Comissió Permanent d’Actes, Comissió Mixta de Reclutament (1912), Comissió de Beneficència, Comissió de Foment (1917), and Comissió Interprovincial de Mancomunitats (1913). During few strings he served as vice-president of Comissió Provincial and in 1910 as presidente interino. However, he assumed most important role when in 1914 delegated to Mancomunitat, the body he lobbied for since the early 1910s; in this newly created Catalan self-government he was member of its Consell Permanent and remained on good terms with the president, Enric Prat de la Riba.

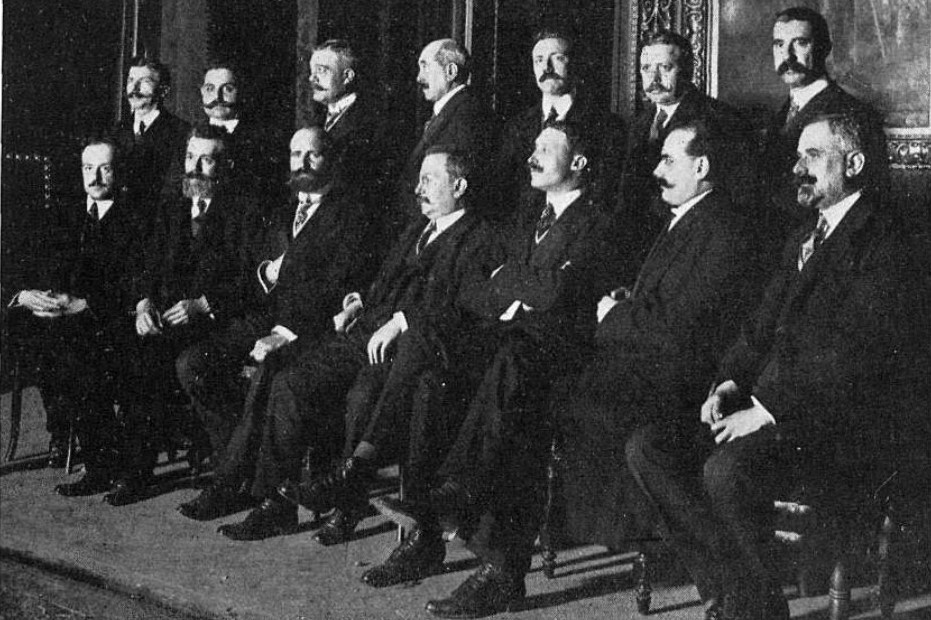
in Mancomunitat, 1917

Within the Carlist organization Argemí periodically served as vice-president of Junta Regional and Junta Provincial, though following the 1915 election to Diputación he resigned all functions. Every some time the press noted his Traditionalist engagements: in 1908 he spoke at a Carlist rally in Manresa, in 1909 he co-presided over Barcelona funeral ceremonies following death of Carlos VII, the same year he co-opened a new círculo in the city, in 1911 he attended a requeté rally in Monistrol and an Agrupación Escolar Tradicionalista banquet in Barcelona, in 1912 he spoke at another banquet, in 1913 he addressed crowds at Fiesta de Reyes, in 1916 he took part in an aplech in Tona, in 1917 he attended another banquet, in 1918 co-presided over a rally in Vich and supported a Carlist candidate to the Cortes from Tarragona. Apart from party events, he took part in Catholic rallies against what was perceived as anti-religious "proyecto de cultura" and against secular schools.

== Senate and Libres (1918–1923) ==
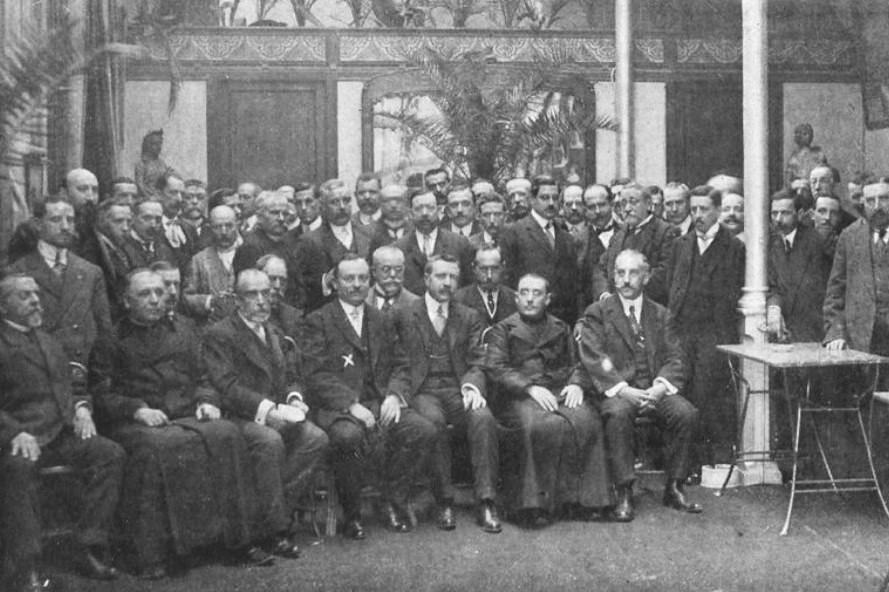
on Accion Social Popular meeting, 1910s

Though Solidaritat Catalana as a political coalition disintegrated in the early 1910s, Catalan Carlists kept co-operating with La Lliga also later. This alliance produced the March 1918 comfortable Argemí's election to the senate from the province of Lérida; he then resigned from Diputación, which in turn resulted in his departure from Mancomunitat. The same political combination got him re-elected in June 1919, though this time he represented the province of Barcelona and the electors only marginally preferred him over the counter-candidate, Alejandro Lerroux. Argemí's term in Madrid terminated in late 1920; there were rumors circulating about his attempts at Carlist-Lliguist-supported re-election (either to the upper or the lower chamber) in 1920, 1922 and 1923, but they either failed or proved unfounded. In the senate much of Argemí's activity was about increasing street violence and social tension in Catalonia, related mostly to growth of Anarchism. Numerous times he spoke about "el problema sindicalista" and "desarrollo de un proceso revolucionario evidente", calling the government to implement "extraordinary measures"; in this respect he also co-operated with the Madrid administration. Many of Barcelona press titles reported his endeavors in detail.

Argemí confronted Anarchist tradeunionism also beyond the Cortes. In the 1900s he co-organized Comité de Defensa Social and then was active in Acción Social Popular, e.g. during so-called Semana Social. In 1919 he was among key promoters of a newly found Catholic trade union, Sindicato Libre; historians claim that "the principal goal of this union was to oppose the CNT’s dominance". It is supposed that Argemí purchased firearms, intended for the Libres when confronting CNT. The Anarchist newspaper denounced them as killers paid by employers and in similar tone some historians claim that the syndicate "embodied Barcelona’s first fascist movement". Barcelona was soon engulfed in the violent wave of urban pistolerismo. Either Argemí's plant or its employees were repeatedly assaulted, be it in 1915, 1916, 1920, 1921 or 1923. The violence climaxed when in June 1923 unidentified pistoleros shot his brother-in-law, Joaquín Albiñana; the press widely speculated that he was killed by mistake, and the actual target was Argemí.

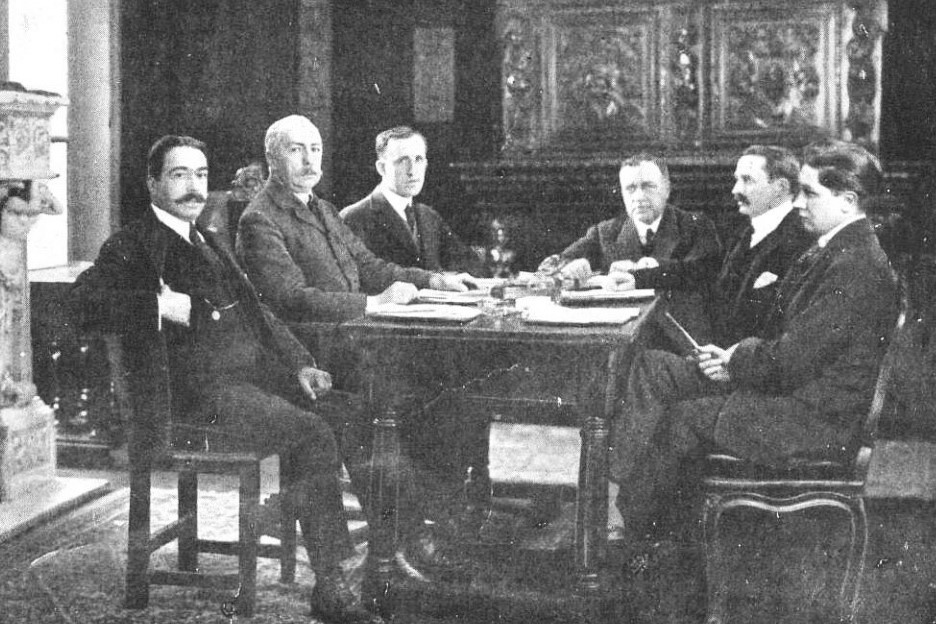
with Don Jaime, Paris 1923

Within Carlism in the late 1910s Argemí entered the national executive, Junta Suprema, where he lobbied for neutrality during the Great War. Though the anti-Catalanist faction in the party lambasted "Junyent, Argemí, Trias y Cía" as traitors to Don Jaime, sold to the regionalistas, during the Mellista breakup in 1919 he remained loyal to his king. He was nominated to new Junta Regional of "carácter interino", though seldom he appeared also beyond Catalonia, e.g. at Mitin Social Jaimista in Madrid in 1920. Argemí enjoyed confidence of the claimant, as in 1922 and 1923 he travelled to Paris to receive latest instructions; upon return he used to brief the Catalan executive and published press articles in the regional party mouthpiece, El Correo Catalan; he explained that Don Jaime was sympathetic towards the Catalan self, but also firmly against separatism. In 1923 he headed Departamento de Organización in Junta Regional.

== On the sidelines: dictatorship, republic and war (1923–1939) ==
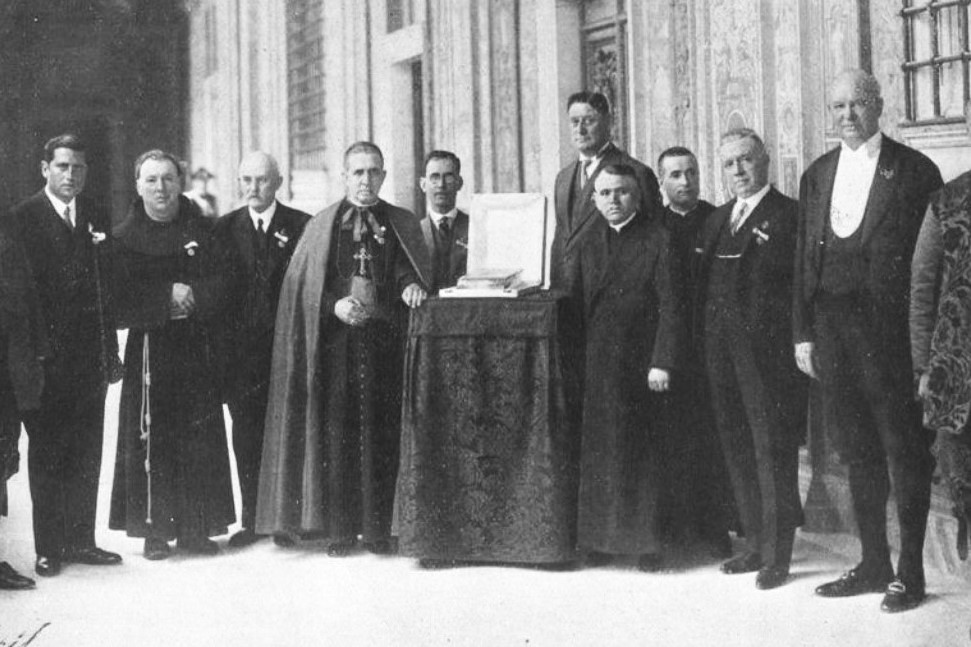
in Vatican, 1930

The coming of the Primo dictatorship was to an extent the result of breakdown of public order and the wave of pistolerismo in Catalonia, yet there is no evidence that Argemí got engaged in support of the dictadura. He was noted neither as member of the primoderiverista quasi-party Unión Patriotica nor the quasi-militia Somatén; no press title reported his taking part in official rallies or ceremonies. Labor disputes in Industrias Químicas Albiñana Argemi SA were dealt with by an arbitration body set up by the regime, Comité Paritario, e.g. in 1928. If noted in the press, it was rather in relation to attempts to defuse tension by means of Catholic social teaching, e.g. in the local Junta de Obra (1924) or when engaged in charity (1926, 1928). In 1930 he co-ordinated, partially financed and headed a pilgrimage to Vatican, officially organized under the auspices of the Catholic Barcelona weekly, La Hormiga de Oro. Within Carlist structures, barely operational due to political limitations imposed by the dictatorship, he was rather inactive, until in 1925 he resigned from Junta Regional.

Following the advent of the Republic in 1931 Argemí remained on the sidelines of Carlist politics and entered neither the Barcelona Junta Provincial not the Catalan Junta Regional; a monographic work on Catalan Carlism during the republican era mentions him only once, in relation to the 1932 elections to the regional autonomous parliament. He no longer allied with Lliga Regionalista and was running on a far-right coalition list of Dreta de Catalunya from the urban Barcelona constituency. The alliance performed disastrously; while the victorious Esquerra/Unió Socialista candidates got 50-60,000 votes and the Lliga candidates got around 30,000, the Dreta hopefuls were supported on average by some 6,000 voters; Argemí got 6,025 votes. Afterwards he was noted only when taking part in Comunión Tradicionalista rally against planned legislation on religious orders in 1933 or together with Catalan party heavyweights like Junyent, Roma, Gomis, Alier or Trias visiting local círculos. Some of his engagements combined political and religious threads, e.g. when acting as treasurer in Junta Diocesana of Acción Católica branch or co-organizing Fiesta de Santos Reyes. During electoral campaign in early 1936 he appeared at meetings of Bloque Nacional.

Carlist standard

Neither any of historiographic works available nor the press provides any clue as to Argemí's whereabouts during the civil war. Since Catalonia fell largely under the Anarchist control, he seemed a perfect target for revolutionary wrath: not merely a member of bourgeoisie, but also high administrative official, the owner of a large factory with long record in labor conflicts, promoter of competitive trade unions allegedly bent on killing CNT members, a Catholic activist and a Carlist. It is not clear whether he was spared or went into hiding, though he probably remained in Catalonia; on February 1, 1939, merely 6 days following the Nationalist takeover of Barcelona, he was received in the city by Jefe Provincial of Falange Española Tradicionalista.

== Francoism: diputación again (1939 and after) ==
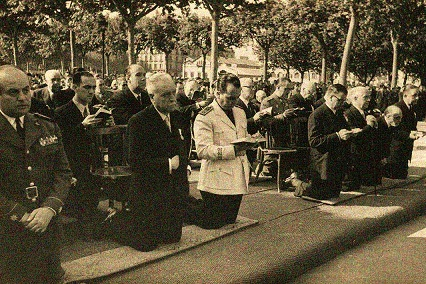
during Francoist ceremony, 1940s

Between 1939 and 1940 Argemí was noted as treasurer in executive of Junta Diocesana of Acción Católica. In the early 1940s he started to appear at official ceremonies. In 1942 he was acknowledged as taking part in Martires de la Tradición, a traditional Carlist function this time organized by Junta Provincial del Movimiento. It seems he accepted amalgamation of Carlism within the Francoist state party FET: in early 1943, during another solemn service, he received from Sancho Dávila the Medalla de la Vieja Guardia of Movimiento, and was listed in the press as "antiguo carlista", among "más prestigiosas figuras del Tradicionalismo". He co-led a campaign to celebrate the centenary of El Criterio by Jaime Balmes; first he organized a dedicated session in Vich and edited a later commemorative volume, then in 1943 he entered Junta Ejecutiva, entrusted with organizing the appropriate observance in Barcelona.

It is not entirely clear when Argemí was appointed to Comisión Gestora Provincional, a receivership which acted as Diputación Provincial; a single press note from January 1942 noted him as representing the body yet later notes referred to him merely as "don Luis Argemi". In December 1943 the civil governor nominated him to the renewed Diputación and appointed its president; Argemí's first step was sending a ritual telegram message to Franco. His term lasted barely more than 2 years, until January 1946. The position and the entire body enjoyed little decision-making capacity, yet it is noted that as president he "championed the interests of the municipalities, unions and guilds; he fought to maintain the Diputación's income level to cover the maintenance costs of institutions under its care". In 1944 he received Cruz de Honor de San Raimundo de Peñafort and in 1946 Gran Cruz del Mérito Civil. During a rare address which went beyond customary official speak he declared that "yo nunca me llamé demócrata" and castigated democracy founded on fraud, but admitted that was prepared to accept democracy founded on Christian principles, Decalogue and the Bible. A routine tribute to Caudillo followed.

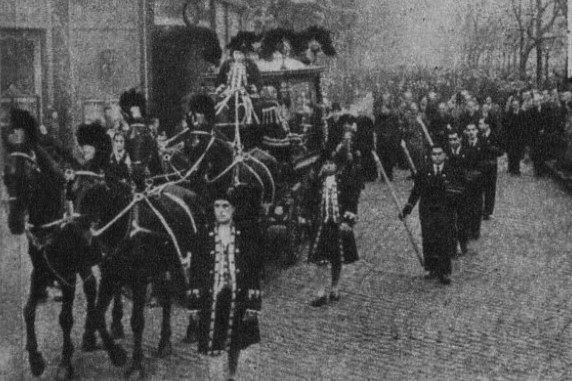
Argemí's funeral, 1950

In 1946 Argemí was not appointed to the new Diputación. However, he did not fall from grace and at times took part in official events or visited local officials. In 1947 the press mentioned him when voting in referendum on the Law of Succession to the Headship of the State; in 1948 during a solemn ceremony his portrait was placed in the Diputación premises. There is no information on any Carlist engagements; in 1948 a carloctavista bulletin counted him among "amigos nuestros", yet no source confirms he supported the carloctavista faction of Traditionalism. Until death he was member of Junta Provincial de Protección de Menores, honorary president of Asociación de Amigos de la Ciudad and councilor of Caja de Pensiones para Vejez y de Ahorros. His funeral was attended by the civil governor, the president of diputación and the mayor of Barcelona. In 1950 in Manresa a street was named after him; it bore his name until 2019.

== See also ==
- Carlism
- Traditionalism (Spain)
- Sindicatos Libres

== Footnotes ==
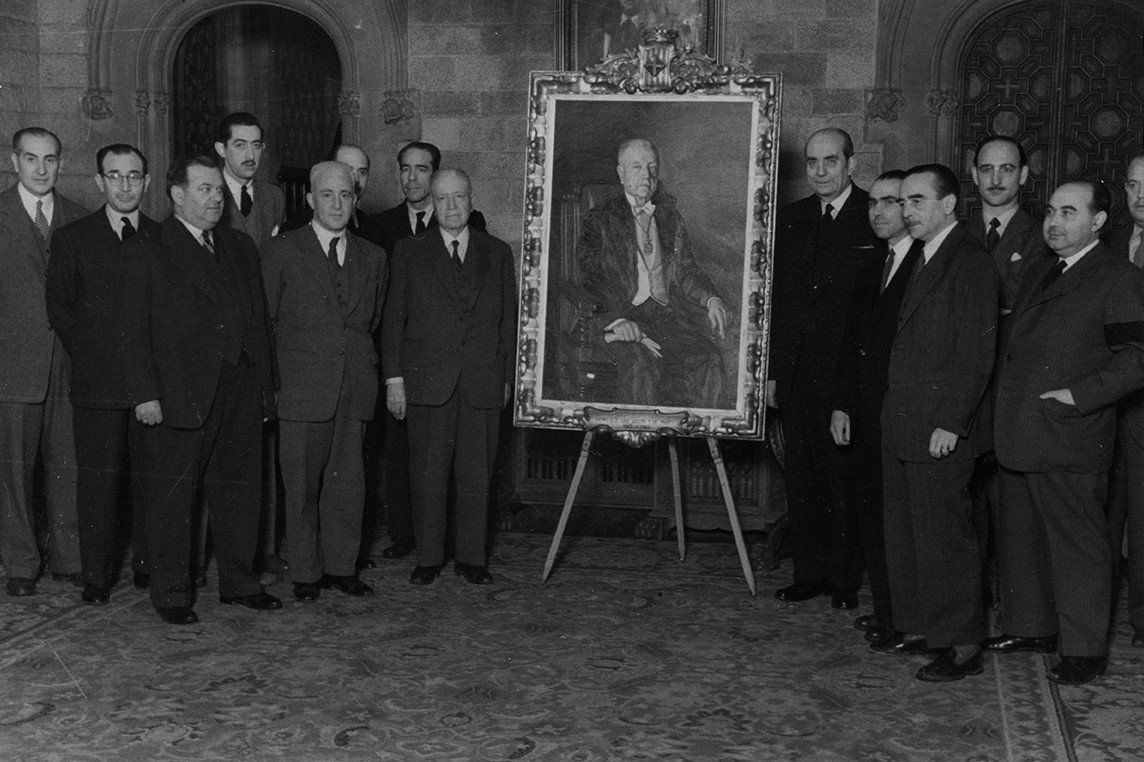
Argemi watches his portrait being placed in Diputacion, 1948
