= Juan Sáenz-Díez García =

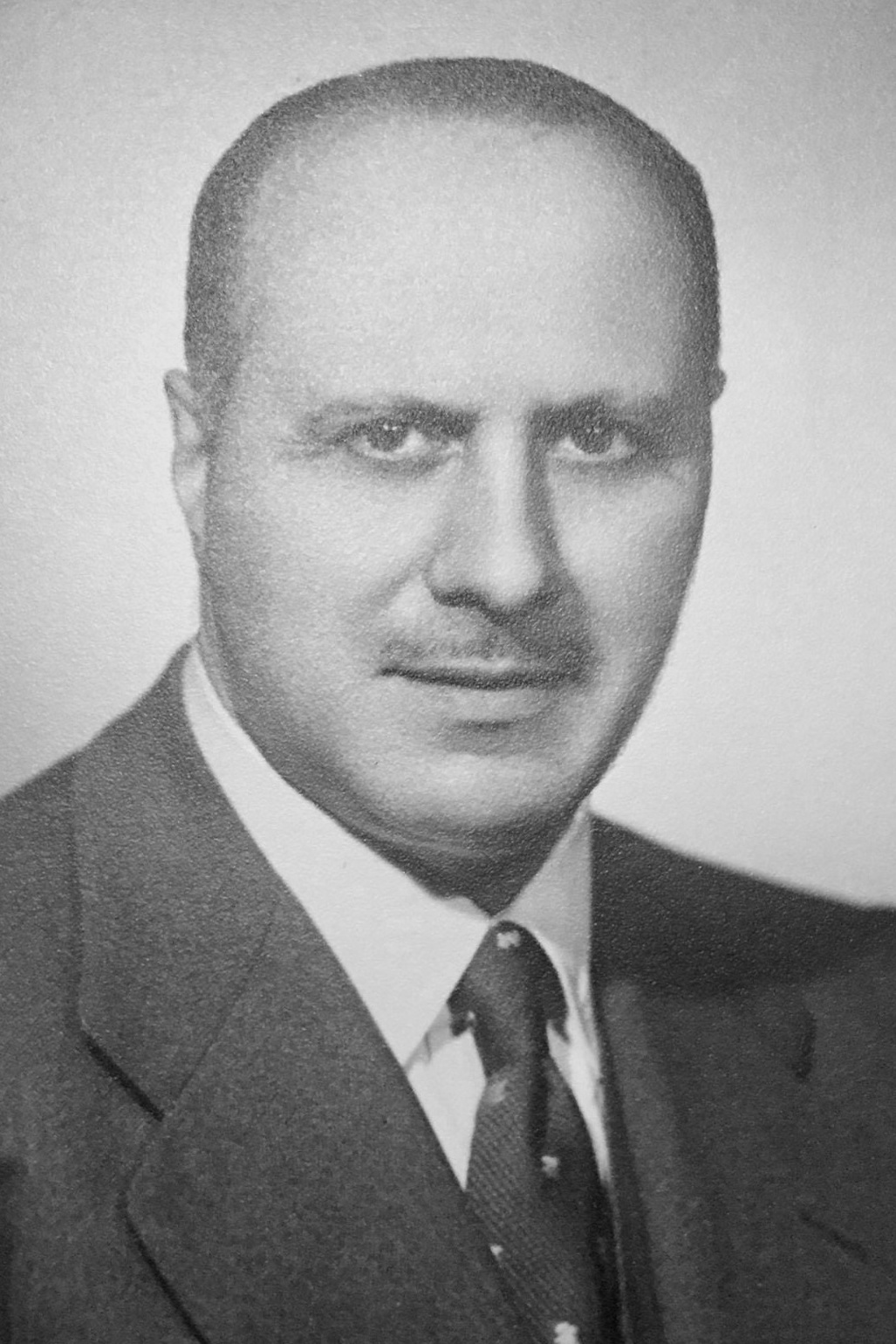
- Born: Juan Sáenz-Díez García; 1903; Santiago de Compostela, Spain
- Died: 1990 (aged 86–87); Madrid, Spain
- Occupation: business manager
- Known for: politician
- Political party: Comunión Tradicionalista, Comunión Tradicionalista (1977)

Juan Sáenz-Díez García (1904–1990) was a Spanish entrepreneur and Carlist politician. In business he is known among key managers of the Simeón García family conglomerate. In politics he counted among architects of cautiously collaborative course during mid-Francoism and leader of a Traditionalist organization Comunión Tradicionalista, active during the transición period. He is also recognized as owner of an iconic Galician daily El Correo Gallego.

== Family and youth ==
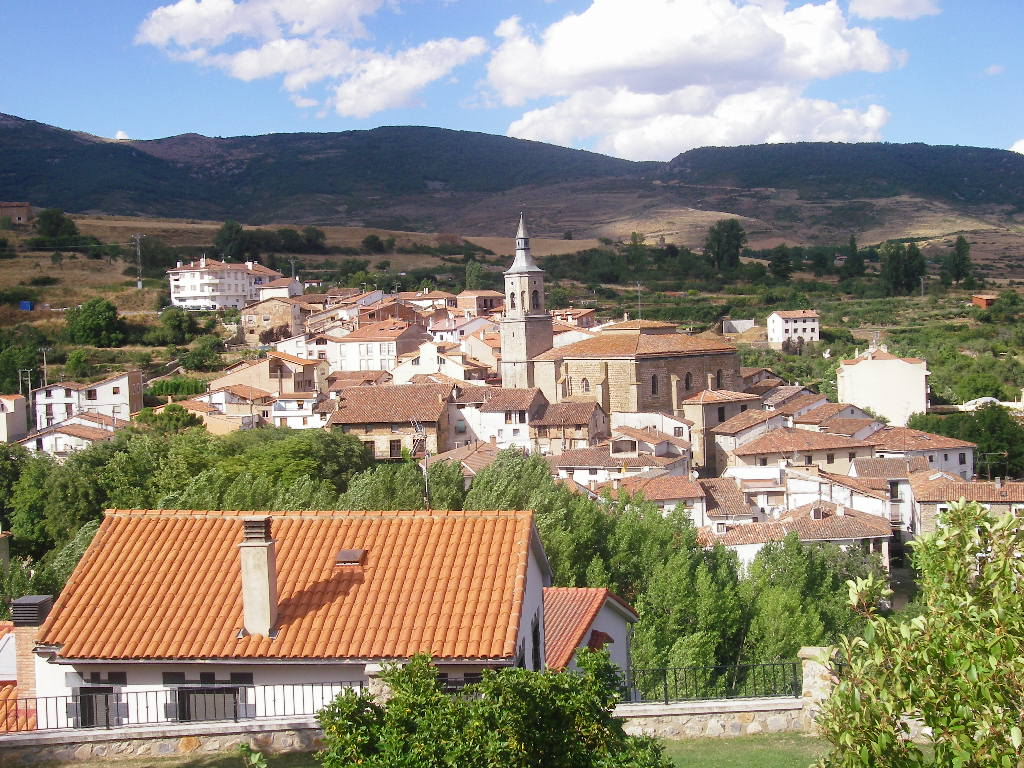
Torrecilla en Cameros

Both Sáenz-Díez and Garcia families originated from the comarca of Cameros in the Logroño province. Juan's paternal grandfather, Pedro Sáenz-Díez Ibarra, was related to petty textile manufacturing in Torecilla de Cameros. His son and Juan's father, Acisclo Sáenz-Díez de la Riva (1867-1905), was also born in Cameros. As a youngster he left his native town and moved to Galicia, not an unlikely decision as there was a notable influx of migrants from Logroño to Galicia at the time. He settled in Santiago, assisting relatives in family business and becoming a successful entrepreneur. At unspecified data he married Isabel García Blanco (1873–1956), daughter of a trade tycoon Simeón García de Olalla y de la Riva (1823–1889). Also a Riojano from Cameros and also a migrant to Galicia, back in the 1850s he launched a trading company dealing in textiles. By the late 1880s he was already operating a number of companies which grew to major business; active in all of Northern Spain from Galicia to Catalonia, they gave rise to a family fortune. Acisclo and Isabel settled in Santiago; it is not clear how many children the couple had.

Following the death of his father-in-law it was Acisclo Sáenz-Díez who became – together with his mother-in-law, Juana Blanca Navarrete – the moving spirit behind the Simeón García trading empire. Though not admitted as partner, he grew to manager of the key family company, Viuda y Hijos de Simeón García, developing the retail network further on. He also engaged in local Galician electricity and railway businesses, launching some new companies on his own. Following premature death of Acisclo the widow moved to Barcelona, but it is not clear whether the young Juan was raised in Santiago or in the Catalan capital; none of the sources consulted provides also any information on his early education. He studied probably in Santiago; neither the faculty where he studied nor the graduation date is known. In the mid-1920s he was already engaged in running the family business.

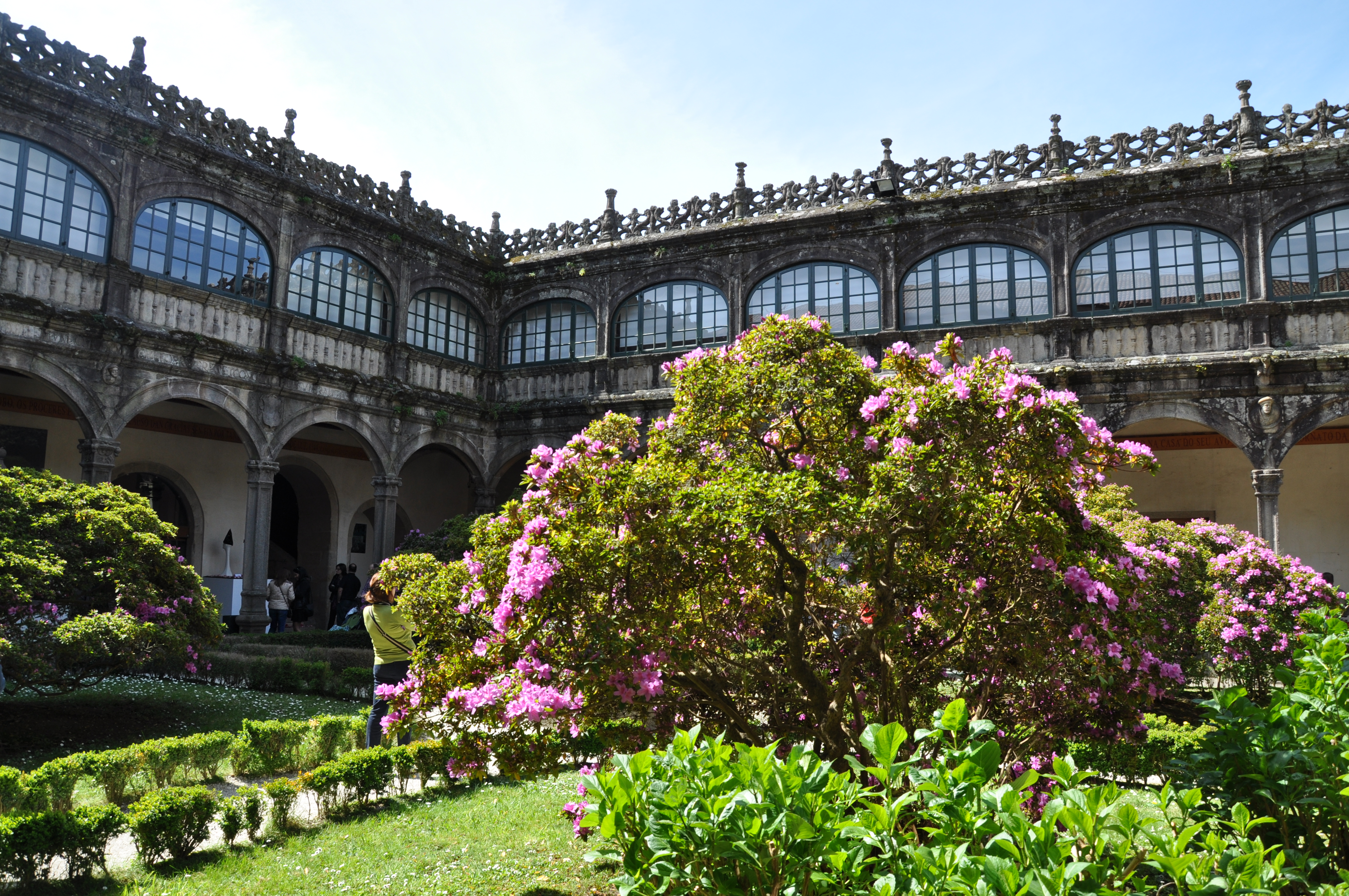
University of Santiago

In 1933 Juan Sáenz-Díez married María de las Mercedes Gándara García (d. 1978); she was the daughter of Joaquín de la Gándara y Carrillo, a fiscal official and owner of land property in Miranda del Duero, and Cándida García Verde, the sister of Carlist leader José María García Verde; in the early 1920s Joaquín de la Gándara had claimed the title of Barón de Velasco. The couple settled in Madrid; they had 8 children. The best known of them, Juan Ignacio Sáenz-Díez de la Gándara, was to become a professor of Arabic studies, expert in numismatics and during early transición an UCD Cortes deputy. Javier is a lawyer and artist, while Carmen Sáenz-Díez de la Gándara was president of a pro-life organization in Lugo. Two sons dedicated their lives to religion: Fernando was a Jesuit priest while José Luis Sáenz-Díez de la Gándara was a parochial priest in Carabanchel. Also Juan's granddaughter, Fátima Santaló Sáenz-Díez, became a nun, while her sister Mercedes was champion of Spain in the discus throw.

== Businessman ==
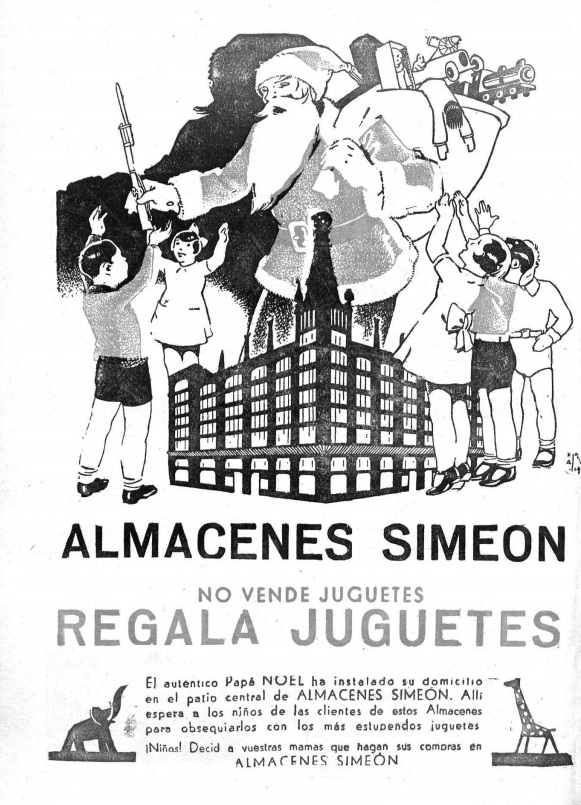
press advert, 1930s

Though not majority partners, the Sáenz-Díez Garcías emerged as the most influential branch of all the Simeón García descendants, holding some 30% stakes in the family conglomerate. Juan was from his youth being prepared to enter the business. Having reached the legal age, in 1923 he was registered as member of the board of Hijos de Simeón García de Santiago SRC and Hijos de Simeón García S.A, two companies forming part of the family retail group; it is not clear what exactly his role was. In the late 1920s he lived in the United States, getting familiar with the New York stock exchange; the heirs of Simeón García lost some $1m during the Wall Street 1929 crash. Back in Spain he resumed duties in other family companies, though he attempted also to start his own business; he launched a manufacturing company Iría S.A. and in the mid-1930s became president of Coloniales Sáenz-Díez S.A., an enterprise trading in colonial and overseas goods.

Though in terms of ownership the Sáenz-Díez branch saw their share of the Simeón García business reduced to some 15%, Juan was assuming key positions in more and more legal entities; in the early 1950s engaged in 3 companies, in the mid-1950s he was already active in 5 and in the late 1960s in 7. It seems that he was among major managers within the family, though not assuming a leading position held earlier by his father. Sáenz-Díez role was reflected by his 1965 appointment to first president of Banco Simeón, a freshly created financial arm of the group. He later ceded the rotating presidency but contributed to growth of the bank in the 1970s, remaining in its executive also after it was bought by Banco Exterior de España later on. In 1966 he entered the board of Almacenes Simeón, a new company operating a chain of shopping malls, and in 1968 he was nominated vice-president of Federación Financiera, in 1971 fully converted into a holding controlling key companies owned by the family. The early 1980s were the period when Sáenz-Díez was in the executive of 9 companies, but by the midst of the decade he started to withdraw from business engagements, shortly before death holding key positions only in few entities.

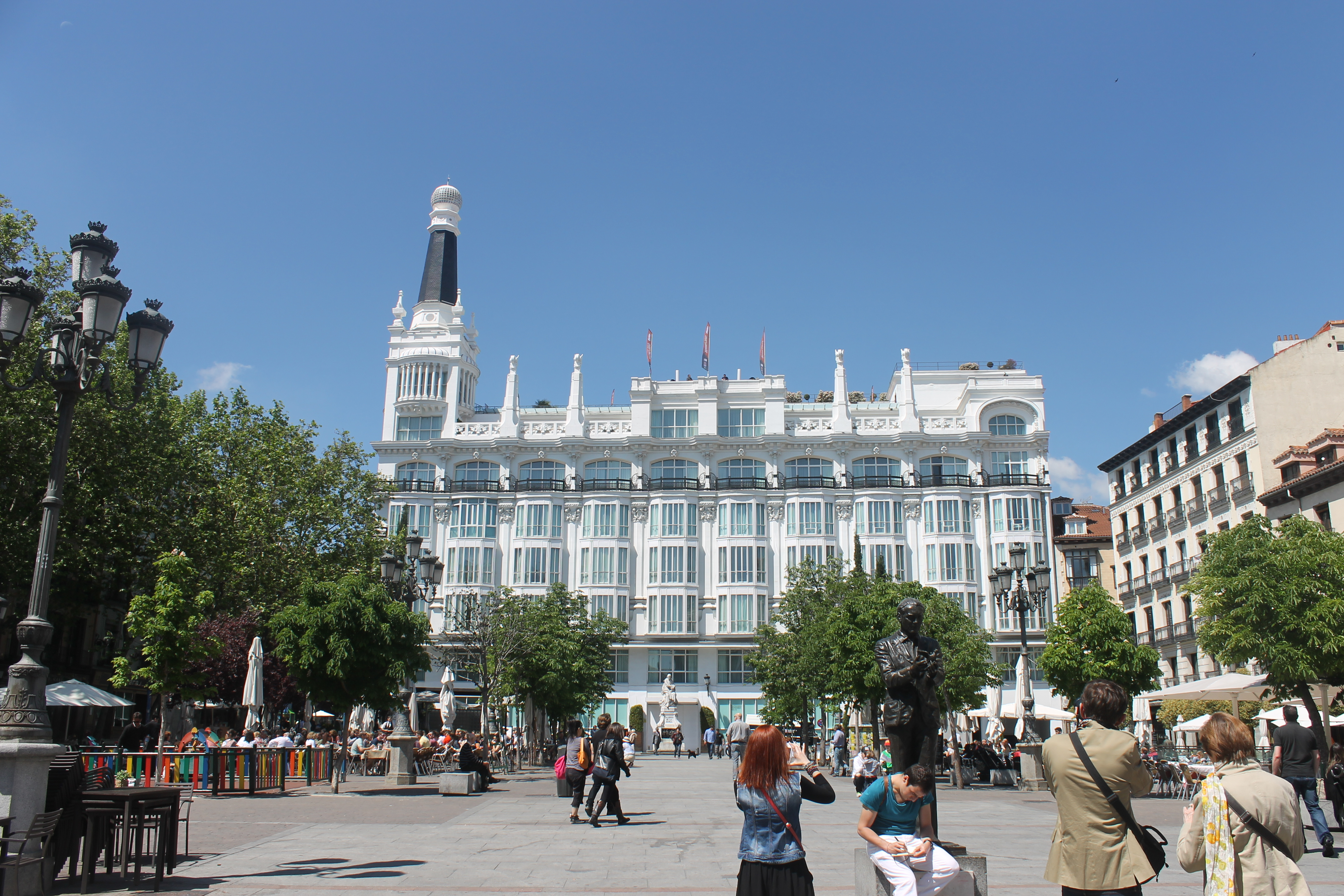
Madrid, former Simeón mall

Apart from major managerial roles in family owned companies, Sáenz-Díez was active also in corporative commercial and labor organizations. Its climax fell on the 1950s, when he became known as a young and dynamic businessman. In 1951 he co-founded Acción Social Patronal, a Catholic labor organization somewhat competitive to official syndical structure, and entered its Comisión Nacional. Also in the early 1950s he grew to president of Consejo Superior de las Cámaras Oficiales de Comercio, Industria y Navegación en España, though it is not clear how long he held the job. Beyond the retail and wholesale trade realm he was active also in associations of the banking industry, stemming from his role in Banco Simeón, Banco de Crédito y Inversiones and other finance companies.

== Civil War: political rise (1936) ==
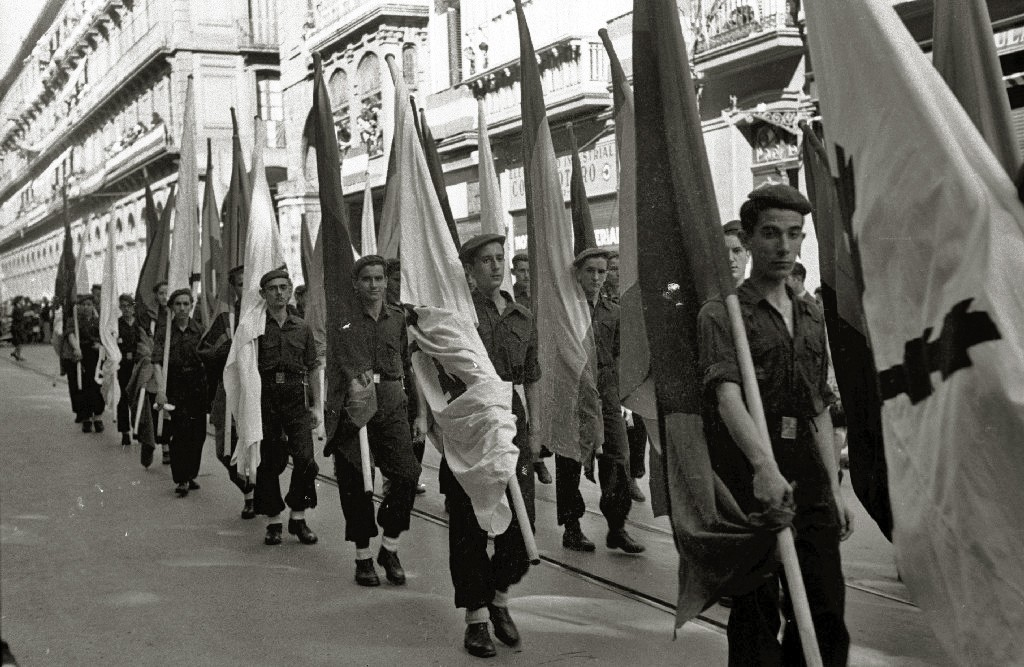
Requete on parade

Sáenz-Díez’ ancestors made their name in business, but they stayed clear of politics and nothing is known of their preferences. Until his early 30s also Juan did not demonstrate any penchant either for political activity or for public engagements. In the 1920s his only endeavors were those related to the local Santiago societé and tourist organizations; once in the early 1930s he had moved to Madrid he was noted merely for presence in Junta de Gobierno of Ler Gallego, an association of the Gallegos living in the capital. Though in the final years of the Republic he donated small sums to right-wing press, he was not recognized as militant of any party or grouping.

During the July 1936 coup the family were enjoying summer holiday in Galicia, the region fairly easily seized by the rebels. It was only at this point that Sáenz-Díez became known as enthusiastically throwing himself into politics. In the late August letter to other family members, made public by the press, he emphatically declared that half-hearted reforms of Primo de Rivera must not be repeated and that "hay que removerlo todo y renovarlo todo" in order to restore the traditional, Catholic and missionary Spain. The letter, bordering a political declaration, was strongly flavored by Traditionalism. He hailed local Galician requeté units, heading towards the León front, and boasted of his 2-year-old son, Juan Ignacio, wearing a Carlist beret "con borla y todo". He also engaged the family capital in purchase of an established Ferrol daily El Correo Gallego, turning it into a Traditionalist tribune.

Carlist standard

In the late summer and early autumn of 1936 Sáenz-Díez recorded a spectacular rise to nationwide Carlist executive structures. None of the sources consulted provides any information on its logic and it is not clear what mechanism within few weeks elevated him from a newcomer to member of the party command group. However, it is likely that his personal links with the group of former Andalusian Integrists, forged by means of marriage, contributed to the process. He is not listed as member of early Carlist wartime governing bodies, formed in August, but in some sources he appears as forming part of them possibly as early as in September, referred to diminutively as "Juanito". By the end of the year he was already confirmed as member of Junta Nacional Carlista de Guerra; out of its two sections, the War and the Administrative ones, he formed part of the latter, based in Burgos, and together with José María Valiente and José María Lamamié emerged as its key personality. Formally he was heading a logistics sub-division named Delegación de Intendencia.

== Early Francoism: in opposition (1937–1955) ==
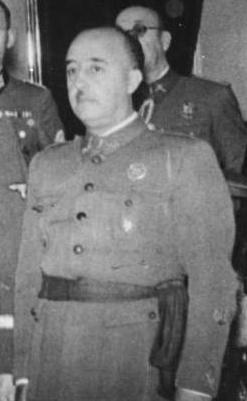
Franco, 1940s

In late December 1936 Sáenz-Díez took part in a meeting of Junta Nacional in Toledo, intended to discuss Franco's demand that the party leader, Manuel Fal, leaves Spain; nothing is known about his position on the issue. In February 1937 as delegado de intendencia he travelled to the Portuguese Insua, where the exiled Fal had settled, to agree Carlist position versus the looming threat of amalgamation into a new state party. The meeting seemed to have ended with supporters of an intransigent stand gaining the upper hand, but during the next two meetings the balance tilted towards a conciliatory position and ultimately non-resistance to Unification Decree. It is not known whether initially Sáenz-Díez formed part of the pro-unification or the anti-unification faction, but afterward he tended to ally with the latter. In course of 1937 and 1938 he went on editing El Correo Gallego along vaguely Traditionalist lines. Formally a property of a freshly set up Editorial Compostela S.A., the daily was spared amalgamation into the Francoist propaganda machinery; its headquarters was moved from El Ferrol to Santiago, a Traditionalist José Goñi Aizpurúa was recruited as its chief editor and its infrastructure underwent technological upgrade, fitted with modern printing machinery.

Upon the final 1939 Nationalist victory Sáenz-Díez was among signatories of Manifestación de los Ideales Tradicionalistas, a memorandum addressed to Franco and demanding instauration of a Traditionalist monarchy. In the early 1940s member of Junta Auxiliar, a loose and makeshift leadership group of increasingly fragmented and bewildered movement, he adopted a skeptical though not openly challenging stand towards the regime, in internal documents lambasting it as "intruso e usurpador". In 1943 he co-signed another manifesto, known as Reclamación de poder; handed to general Vigon and delivered to though not acknowledged by Franco, it re-emphasized earlier Traditionalist demands. In 1944 together with few other Carlist leaders Sáenz-Diez took part in a meeting with Juanistas, intended to discuss a would-be coup against Franco, but voiced against taking any bold action; in 1945 he was present during Carlist riots in Pamplona, later detained in his Madrid house and brought to the Navarrese capital for investigation; it is not clear what administrative measures were applied against him.

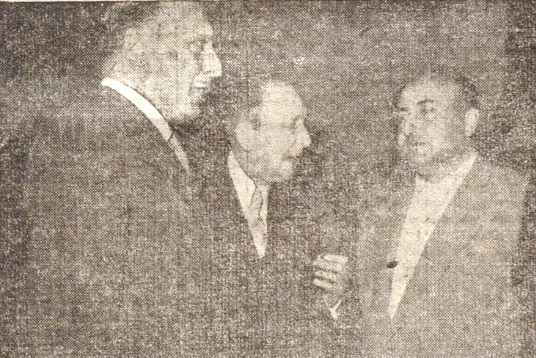
with Gomis in board of Informaciones, 1953

In the late 1940s Sáenz-Díez remained member of the rather inactive Carlist leadership, in 1947 nominated to the first post-war Consejo Nacional and taking part in meager party initiatives, also abroad. When in the early 1950s Manuel Fal commenced a project of launching a semi-official national Carlist daily, due to his business position Sáenz-Díez was entrusted with bringing it to a successful end. Since 1951 he set sights on Informaciones, an ailing Madrid commercial newspaper; following some legal and financial maneuvering, in 1953 he purchased the daily. Formally his private property, it was left at disposal of Comunión Tradicionalista and pursued its editorial line. Sáenz-Díez entered Consejo de Administración and brought new staff to the newspaper, transferring his old collaborator Goñi Aizpurúa from El Correo Gallego and attracting other professionals.

== Mid-Francoism: collaborationist (1955–1963) ==
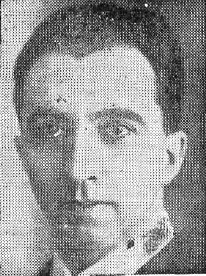
Valiente (earlier photo)

In the mid-1950s the leadership of Fal was challenged by two factions: one advocated more intransigent opposition and another suggested rapprochement with the regime; Sáenz-Díez was among the latter. In 1955 the claimant Don Javier appointed him to new Junta Nacional, a body officially supposed to assist Fal but in fact undermining his leadership. Fal resigned shortly afterwards; there was no successor appointed as Jefe Delegado, and in 1956 the party leadership was transferred to a new collegial executive, named Secretaria Nacional and presided by José María Valiente. Sáenz-Díez was one of its 4 members, entering strict command layer of the party. He was also appointed head of the economic section, named Secretario Nacional de Hacienda; effectively he remained the Carlist treasurer.

Sáenz-Díez emerged as one of the key architects of the party strategy. On the one hand, he tried to fight off a faction seeking dynastical alliance with the Alfonsinos and ensured that its representatives, like Araúz de Robles, were sidetracked; firmly loyal to the Borbón-Parmas, he dissuaded the claimant from returning to a vague regency formula. On the other, he contained those sticking to vehemently anti-Francoist course, like a semi-rebellious Junta de las Regiones. He prepared a memorandum, advocating cautious co-operation with the regime; clinging to own identity, it proposed "June 18" as basis of common understanding with Falange. Its key points were rejection of economic liberalism, hostility to parliamentary democracy and keeping the Juanista monarchists at bay. However, the document pointed also to a need of numerous changes, directed at removing quasi-totalitarian features of the regime and at some sort of official institutionalization of Carlism.

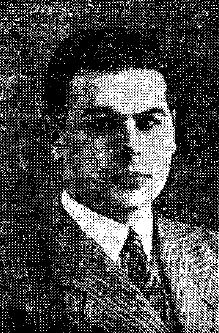
Zamanillo (earlier photo)

In the late 1950s Sáenz-Díez enjoyed his political climax, together with Valiente and José Luis Zamanillo remaining behind the steering wheel of the Carlist politics; according to some he formed the party ruling triumvirate. In 1957 the three negotiated ministerial jobs with José Luis Arrese; the same year during an annual Montejurra congregation he was among those introducing the prince Carlos Hugo, who in turn delivered a speech sounding like an offer to Franco. Prior to the gathering the following year he even pre-agreed the Carlos Hugo speech with the regime officials, in 1959 underlining common combatant past of the Requeté and the Falangists and engineering further collaborative strategy.

With Valiente nominated Jefe Delegado, in 1960 the Secretariat was dissolved; Sáenz-Díez was nominated delegate for Catalonia, Aragon and Valencia; in 1961 triumvirate commenced cooperation with the entourage of Don Carlos Hugo. It seemed that both groups went together well, and Sáenz-Díez has even contributed to Azada y asta, a new periodical controlled by the Hugocarlistas. However, in private the latter viewed him as a rotten reactionary. They took advantage of financial failure of Editorial Tradicionalista; the Carlists by a small fraction lost control over the board, resulting in Informaciónes slipping out of their hand. In 1963 he ceased as party treasurer; following expulsion of Zamanillo also the triumvirate broke down, marking the shift of power balance within the party towards the Hugocarlistas.

== Late Francoism: sidetracked (1964–1975) ==
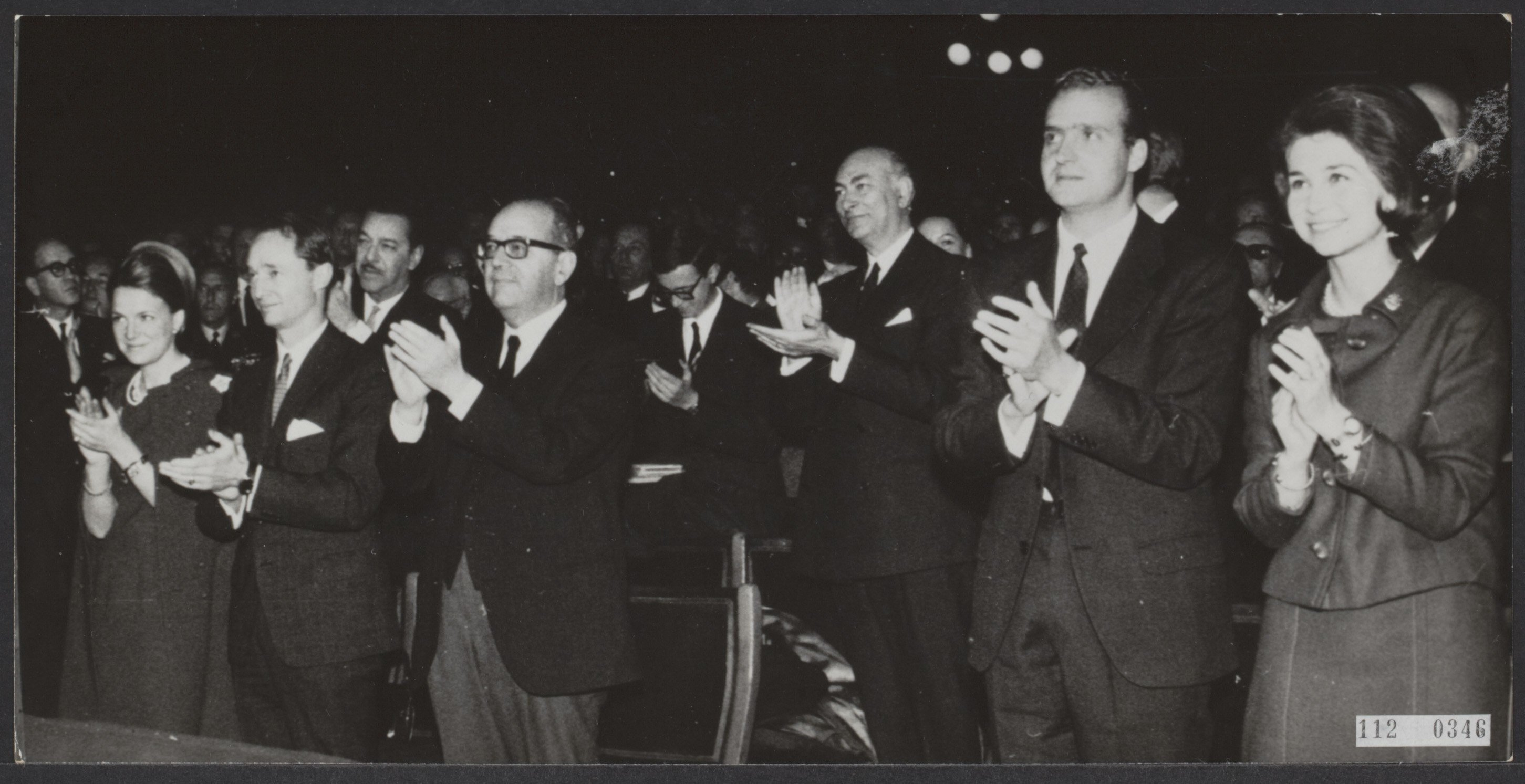
Madrid 1967: Carlist and Alfonsist heir-to-the-throne pretenders with their wives

As the Hugocarlista strategy embraced diluting the powers of Secretariado by new bodies in the governing scheme, the position of Sáenz-Díez decreased. He found it increasingly difficult to co-operate with the young entourage of Don Carlos Hugo, estranged by their ambiguous socially-driven rhetoric. Though at that time some likewise concerned party pundits dissociated themselves from Comunión, Sáenz-Díez did not; unhappy by what he dubbed camarilla of the prince, in the mid-1960s he merely started to withdraw to the second row. As key associate of Valiente, he still counted within the party, though gradually moved from executive to decorative bodies. In 1966 he was appointed to Consejo Privado of Don Javier, intended as camouflage to now almost open Progressist bid for power.

Marginalized in the party, Sáenz-Díez tried his hand in official politics. In 1963 he ran for the Madrid ayuntamiento from Tercio de Entidades Culturales, Económicos y Profesionales, a pool reserved for corporate establishments; his bid was not successful. In 1967 he stood for the Cortes in his native Galicia, taking part in newly introduced, semi-free elections for the pool reserved for the so-called Tercio Familiar. He did not invoke Carlist identity and preferred to exploit general conservative appeal, but the campaign did not work. While the frontrunner attracted support of some 141,000 voters, he had to settle for mere 28,000 ballots.

In the late 1960s the power struggle within Carlism between Traditionalists and Progressists was already rife. Clearly siding with the former, following the 1968 dismissal of Valiente Sáenz-Díez was increasingly isolated; he did not receive appointment to the new Junta Suprema. Some of the Hugocarlista-controlled papers started to lambast him as a dissenter who lost the opportunity to become a respected retiree and he has not been invited to speak at Montejurra again. However, Traditionalists were still able to mount defense; besides, Sáenz-Díez was useful when prompted to protest against the 1968 expulsion of Don Carlos Hugo from Spain. In 1968 he was elected to Consejo Real, a new, 5-member advisory body, supposed to assist the Don Javier.

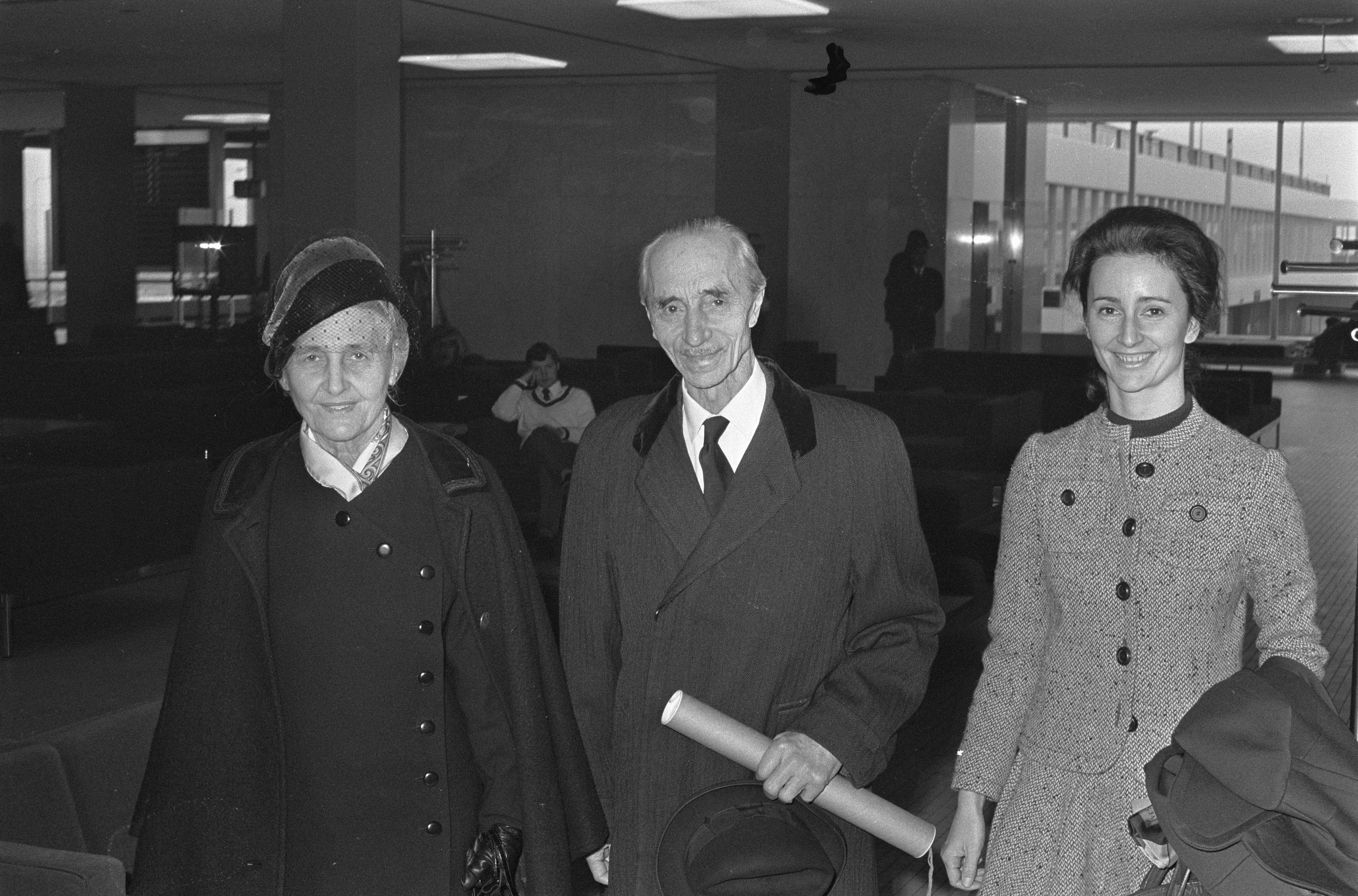
Don Javier and family, early 1970s

At the turn of the decades Sáenz-Díez stayed clear of Partido Carlista, a new Hugocarlista-dominated organization, and stuck to the old format of Comunión Tradicionalista. However, when in 1971 invited to join a rebellion against the Borbón-Parmas, he declined. In 1972 he was considered a would-be leader of a Carlist political association, about to be permitted by the regime, but though estranged by Left-wing course of the prince, he still felt bounded by loyalty to the king; he also feared an ensuing long interregnum, which Carlism might not survive. On the other hand, also in 1972 he wrote a letter to the claimant, explicitly asking whether Don Javier was aware and approved of revolutionary program of the party. Talked into compliance he grudgingly faced up to conformity, but in the spring of 1975 he co-signed ultimative letters, demanding confirmation of Traditionalist values. Having received no reply either from Don Javier or from Don Carlos Hugo, he finally broke apart.

== Second Restoration: leader (after 1975) ==
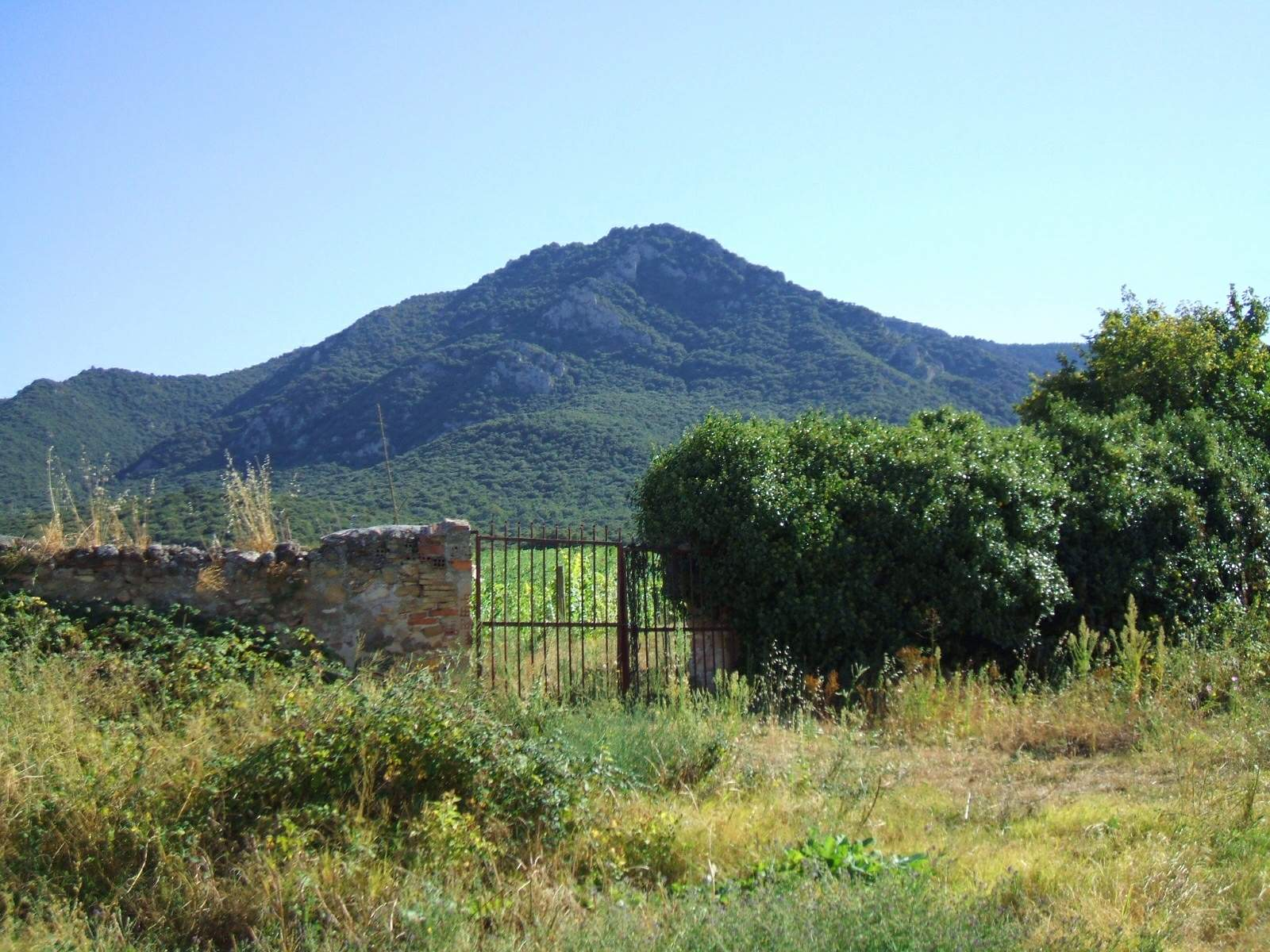
Montejurra

In 1975 Sáenz-Diez joined Hermandad Nacional de Antiguos Combatientes de Requetés, a stepping stone towards a new political structure; he entered its Junta Directiva and became a treasurer. Later that year the organization neared the younger son of Don Javier – who already abdicated in favor of Don Carlos Hugo - Don Sixto, who confirmed allegiance to traditional Carlist values. Falling short from claiming the throne or the regency, he declared himself a standard-bearer of Carlism; in December 1975 he nominated Sáenz-Díez his Jefe Delegado and entrusted him with reorganization of semi-legal Comunión Tradicionalista.

During Transición Sáenz-Díez's Madrid house turned into headquarters of Traditionalism. One of his first initiatives was re-claiming the Montejurra gathering, controlled by the Progressists. In early 1976 he mobilized supporters to ensure highest attendance and co-financed logistics of the Sixtinos; during the very day he was also present at the place. The event, from the onset planned as a confrontation, resulted in 2 Progressists shot. The press communiqué released by Comunión lamented the deaths and claimed not to know where the gunshots had come from, denying that anyone accompanying Don Sixto had fired them. In a second and more detailed press comuniqué, Sixtinos claimed success, consisting of preventing a Marxist meeting and profanation of sacred Carlist site with separatist and subversive plot.

In 1977 Comunión Tradicionalista was registered as a party; with Zamanillo, Oriol and Márquez de Prado, Sáenz-Díez was among its founders. He tried to win over the senile Don Javier; a press communiqué issued from Paris stated that in front of a notary and in presence of Sáenz-Díez and others, the former Carlist king disowned Don Carlos Hugo and his political line. However, he failed to rally all Traditionalists behind his banner: despite a note of understanding signed in 1978 with RENACE, the latter formed Unión Carlista; those not adhering to any dynastical allegiance formed Comunión Católico-Monárquica.

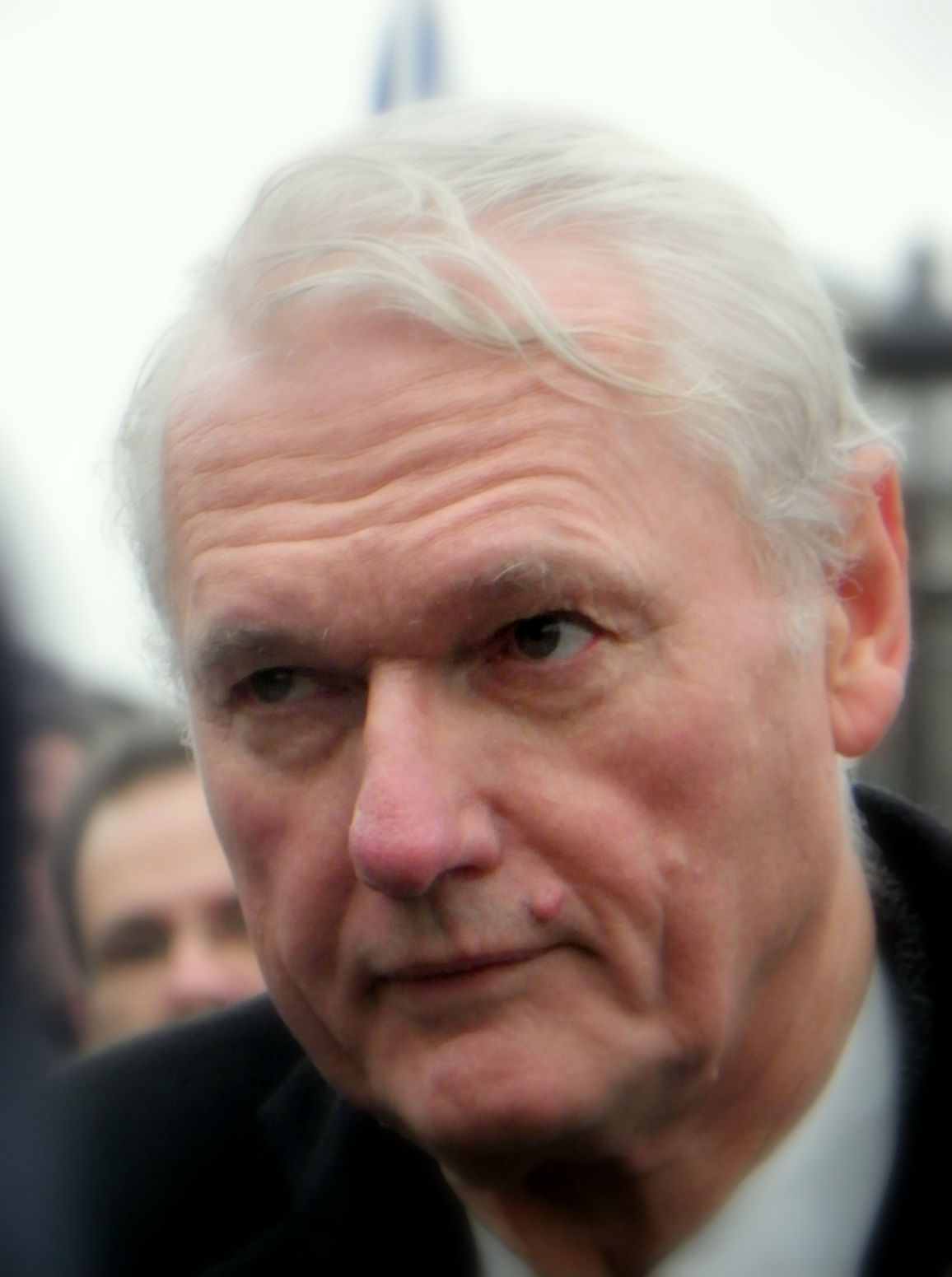
Don Sixto (later pic)

In the late 1970s Sáenz-Díez presided over anti-democratic stand of the Traditionalists and their rapprochement with other far-Right organizations. Prior to the 1979 elections the Sixtinos allied with Fuerza Nueva and Falange to create Unión Nacional, a grouping which gained one seat and disintegrated shortly. In conjunction with other groupings Comunión was still able to rally mass crowds; during the 1980 gathering at the Madrid Plaza de Oriente, organized by Confederación Nacional de Combatientes, at least 300,000 people demonstrated "Por la unidad de España y la esperanza en su futuro"; Sáenz-Díez – usually maintaining low profile and keen to avoid front-row appearances – was the first one to speak.

There is no information on political activity of Sáenz-Díez in the 1980s. It is known that in the early years of the decade Comunión animated Comisión Promotora de la Unidad with the aim of uniting all Traditionalist grouplets. This eventually resulted in the 1986 Congreso para la Unidad Carlista, an event which united existing organizations in Comunión Tradicionalista Carlista. Sáenz-Díez did not enter the party executive and there are different unconfirmed accounts on his stance, especially given CTC admits allegiance neither to any claimant nor to any dynasty.

== See also ==
- Carlism
- Simeón García de la Riva
- El Correo Gallego
- Comunión Tradicionalista (1977)
